= Dan Desdunes =

American musician and civil rights activist (1870–1929)

Daniel F. Desdunes
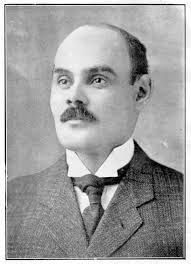
- Born: c. 1870; New Orleans, Louisiana, U.S.
- Died: April 24, 1929; Omaha, Nebraska, U.S.
- Education: Straight University
- Occupation: Musician
- Spouse: Victoria Oliver

Daniel F. Desdunes (c. 1870 – April 24, 1929) was a civil rights activist and musician in New Orleans and Omaha, Nebraska.

In 1892 he volunteered to board a train car designated for whites in violation of the Louisiana 1890 Separate Car Act. This would be a test case to enable the New Orleans Comité des Citoyens to challenge the law in the courts. The train he boarded was an interstate train, and the court found that the law did not apply to such cases, which were bound by federal law and regulation. Shortly thereafter, another member of the Comité des Citoyens, Homer Plessy, was selected to board an intrastate train. He was arrested for refusing to leave the white car, and what became known as Plessy vs Ferguson (1896) was litigated to the US Supreme Court.

In the meantime, Desdunes became a musician, directing bands, orchestras, and minstrel shows and playing many instruments, including the cornet, the violin, the baritone horn, and the trombone. He was known for many styles, including minstrel, ragtime, jazz, gospel, classical, and marching. He performed under the direction of P. G. Lowery in P. T. Wright's Nashville Students and under Harry Prampin in Lash E. Gideon's Grand Afro American Mastodon Minstrels and Gideon's Big Minstrel Carnival.

In 1904 Desdunes moved to Omaha, which had become a destination for African Americans from the South during the Great Migration to northern cities. There his band became a fixture in civic life, and he also led the Boys Town Band at Father Flanagan's Boys Town. He was described as the "father of negro musicians of Omaha" in Harrison J. Pinkett's 1937 manuscript, "An Historical Sketch of the Omaha Negro."

== Early life ==
Desdunes' 1912 rag "Happy Feelings"

Daniel Desdunes was descended from a family of people of color free before the Civil War. He was born in about 1870 (perhaps 1873) to Rodolphe Lucien Desdunes and Mathilde (Cheval). His siblings were Agnes (about 1873), Louise (about 1874), Coritza (born in 1876), and Wendelle (born winter 1876-1877). Rodolphe was a customs agent, civil rights activist, journalist, historian, and poet.

In 1879, Rodolphe started a relationship with Clementine Walker, born in 1860 and daughter of John and Ophelia Walker. Rodolphe and Clementine had at least four children together: Mary Celine (in 1879), John Alexander (1881), Louise (1889), and Oscar (1892). Clementine died September 23, 1893. Mary Celine later became known as Mamie Desdunes and was a blues pianist. Clementine lived near Jelly Roll Morton's godmother and Jérémie and Henriette Desdunes were neighbors of Morton's mother. From this proximity, Morton learned the song he later recorded as "Mamie's Blues" or "2:19 Blues" and attributed to Mamie, singing, "Can’t give a dollar, give a lousy dime,/ I wanna feed that hungry man of mine."

Other associates of Mamie included performer Bunk Johnson and promoters Hattie Rogers and Lulu White. Mamie was born March 25, 1879, married George Degay in 1898, and died of tuberculosis on December 4, 1911. Oscar was also a musician and played with his nephew Clarence's (son of Daniel) band, the Joyland Revellers, after Clarence's death in 1933. Rodolphe had three other daughters, possibly by Clementine, named Edna, Lucille, and Jeanne (born about 1893).

Daniel F. Desdunes attended public schools in New Orleans and went to Straight University, a historically black college. After college he worked as a house painter and music teacher.

== Personal life ==
In 1895, Desdunes married Victoria Oliver. They had a son, Clarence, on February 17, 1896, and Victoria died shortly afterward. Desdunes married a second time to Madia Dodd. Desdunes lived in New Orleans for most of the 1890s, although he called Chicago home for part of 1899. In 1904 he moved to Omaha, where he lived the rest of his life.

Madia died March 3, 1930, while visiting her sister, Geneva Mabry in Brooklyn, NY. Her funeral was at St. Philip's Episcopal in Omaha and her burial was at Forest Lawn.

== Comité des Citoyens ==
In 1890, the Separate Car Act was passed by the Louisiana State Legislature, segregating public transportation. Aristide, Rodolphe and Daniel Desdunes, Louis Martinet, Eugene Luscy, Paul Bonseigneur, L. J. Joubert, P. B. S. Pinchback, Caesar Antoine, Homer Plessy and other leaders who had been free men of color before the Civil War formed the Comité des Citoyens to organize black civil rights efforts. Rodolphe enlisted Dan, his eldest son, to violate the act in order to challenge it in court.

On February 24, 1892, Daniel boarded a train bound for Mobile, Alabama. While stopped at the corner of Elysian Fields and Claiborne in New Orleans, Daniel was arrested. However, Judge John Howard Ferguson ruled that the Separate Car Act could not be enforced for interstate travel because the constitution only granted authority only to the federal government to regulate inter-state travel and commerce. The Comité challenged the law again, with a case of intrastate travel. Plessy volunteered to break the law. When the case, Plessy vs. Ferguson, finally reached the U. S. Supreme Court in 1896, the court ruled that it was legitimate for a state to establish "separate but equal" facilities, and Plessy's rights had not been violated. Albion Tourgee and James C. Walker were the lead defense counsel team in both cases. About that time the Comité and the Crusader both disbanded.

== Early career ==
In the early 1890s, Desdunes was performing regularly with cornetist Sylvester Coustaut. Desdunes played violin and baritone horn for the band he co-led, known as the Coustaut-Desdunes Band. Also in the band were violinist O'Neill Levasseur and George Filhe. The band focused on quadrilles and schottishes. Later in the decade, Desdunes joined the fraternal organization the Société des Jeunes Amis, with Philip Nickerson, the son of Professor William Nickerson; and also the Onward Brass Band. He also performed with traveling minstrel shows as early as 1894.

In the late 1890s Desdunes was performing with P. G. Lowery in the P. T. Wright-led Nashville Students. By the spring of 1897, Desdunes was the leader of the orchestra within the group, while Lowery led the band. Harry Gilliam was the stage manager, and in January 1898, the six soloists were: J. A. Stewart (tuba), M. McQuitty (baritone), E. O. Green (slide trombone), Desdunes (alto), L. E. Gideon (cornet), and Lowery (cornet). The rest of the band were F. C. Richardson (clarionet), Harry Gilliam (1st alto), Ed McGruder (2nd trombone), A. P. Harris (bass drum), Gorden and C. Collins (snare drum).

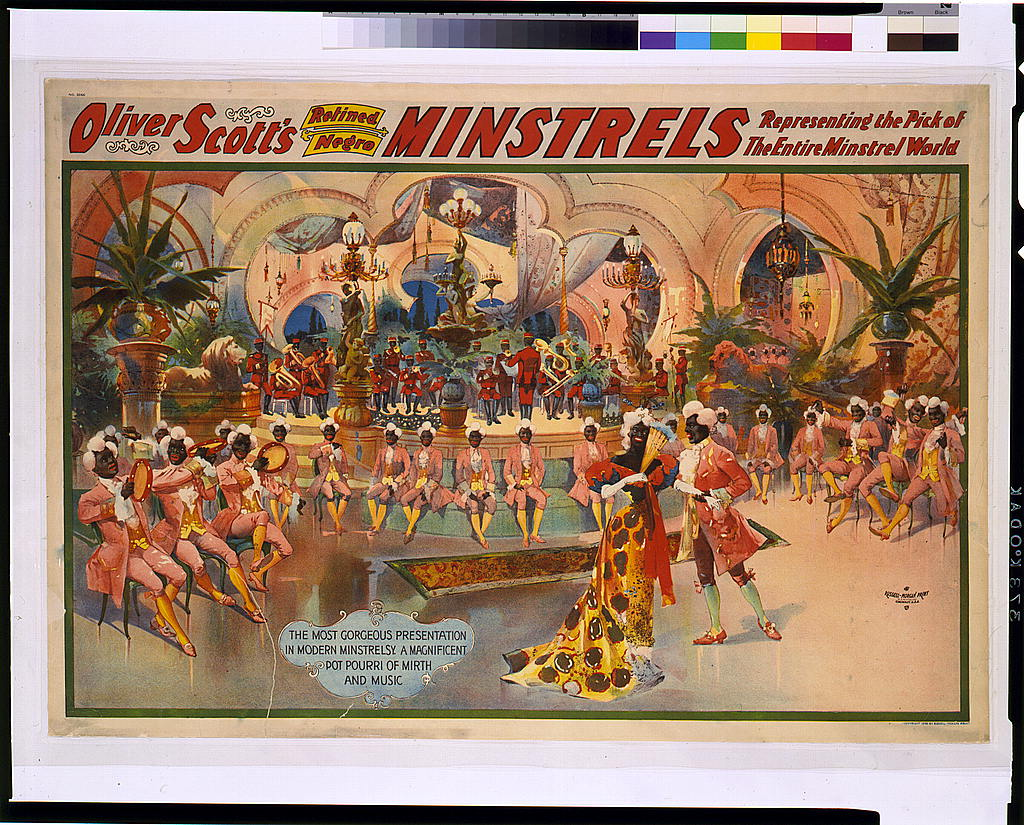
Oliver Scott's Refined Negro Minstrels representing the pick of the entire minstrel world.

In autumn 1898, cornetist Harry Prampin replaced Lowery as the head of the band, and Prampin's wife, Laura, joined as a trap drummer. Also, Desdunes occasionally played second trombone in the band under Prampin, while his orchestra's repertoire included overtures from the operas Raymond and Lucrezia Borgia. Other significant musicians joined the band over the following few years, including cornetist Frank Clermont, M. F. Watts and Cecil Smith Watts.

The Nashville singers toured nationally, from Maine to California, and Desdunes' role included a noted arrangement of music to go with the work of group comedians Harris and S. H. Dudley. He also performed as first alto in 1898, with many of the same performers, in a group called Fred W. Simpson's Oliver Scott Refined Negro Minstrals, with Harry Prampin (director and soloist), Lash Gideon (solo cornet), George Bryant (first cornet), Ed Rouseve (clarionet), M. T. Watts (second alto), Edward O Green (trombone soloist), Tom Myers (second trombone), M. M. McQuitty (baritone soloist), John Stewart (tuba soloist), S. H. Dudley (snare drum), and A. P. Harris (bass drum).

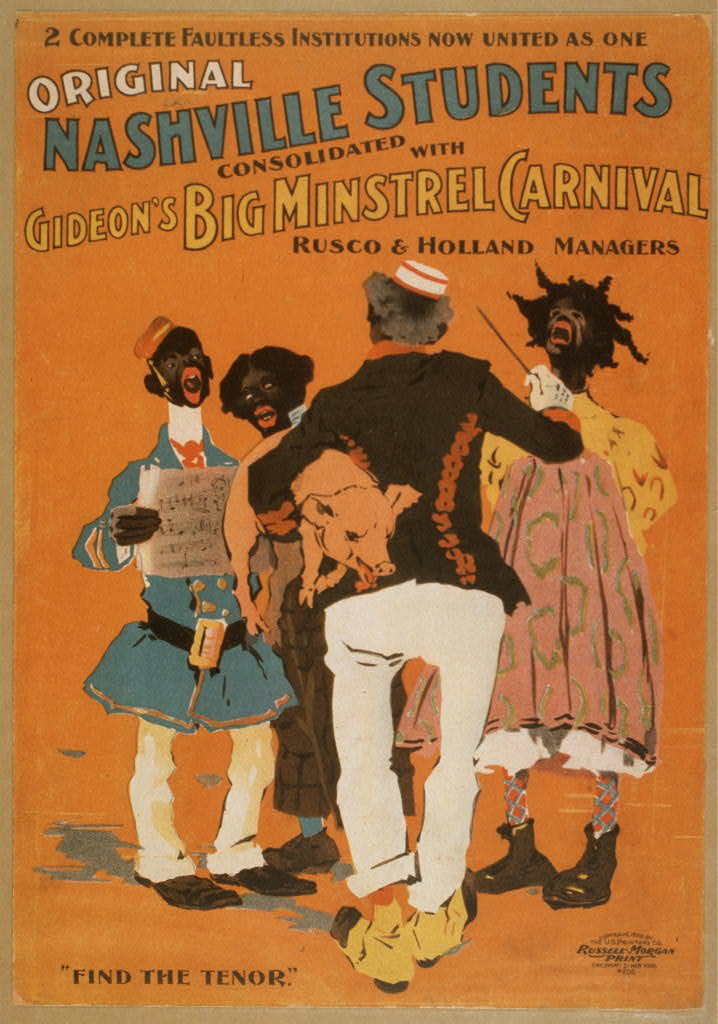
Original Nashville Students consolidated with Gideon's Big Minstrel Carnival

Extending beyond band and orchestra duties, in March 1899 Desdunes joined with Skinner Harris to form a comedy show which performed under the Nashville Students umbrella. Designed played the role of straight man in the duo. Another member of the Nashville Students, L. E. (Lash) Gideon, formed another minstrel show, L. E. Gideon's Grand Afro American Mastodon Minstrels. Desdunes led the orchestra, and Harry Prampin and James H. Wilson led two bands within the collective. In the fall of 1899, Gideon's troupe began touring with the Nashville Students, and soon the groups merged under the name, Gideon's Big Minstrel Carnival. Desdunes musicianship received high honors and his training was highly spoken of. His band masters were listed in the African-American Newspaper the Indianapolis Freeman in December 1900, "commencing with Prof. Henderson Smith; second with Prof. P. G. Lowery, then with Prof. Harry Prampin, and last, but not least, with now Prof. S. E. Dodd". He continued touring with the Nashville Students and Gideons Big Minstrel Carnival through 1901. During this time, he also performed with Ernest Hogan, Ralph Nicholas, and Alcibiade Jeanjacque.

Desdunes songwriting began in this period, including songs, "Gim Me Mine" and "I'm Certainly Feeling Right Today" (the later co-wrote by Harris), as well as a comedy musical act called "The Impecunious Coon". In 1898, P. G. Lowery and his band had visited Omaha for the Trans-Mississippi Exposition and noted in the Indianapolis Freeman his appreciation for the city. In 1904 Desdunes returned to Omaha, performing at the Krug theater with a new musical comedy co-written by himself and Harris, "The Georgia Campmeeting" with W. R. Musgat (manager), I Erbenek (treasurer), Ed Barron, Skinner Harris (stage manager), A. A. Copeland (assistant stage manager), William Bostrick (musical director), George Bryant (band manager), Jack Johnson (vocal director), Ray Trusty, Author (Daddy) White, Frank Clemens, E. M. Ousley, Miss Helen Taylor, Madie Dodd, Hattie Raymond, Mammie Garland Clemens, and Eva Harris. with musiciens under Bryant Sidney Carter (clarionet), William Fitzbutler (solo cornet), Scott Williams (solo cornet), L. E. Gideon (cornet), William Jones (trombone), Albert Fredricks (trombone, William Bostrick (baritone), Desdunes (alto), E. M. Ousley (alto), Frank Clemens (alto), Frank Jackson (bass), Jack Johnson (drums), Skinner Harris (drums), and orchestra under William Bostrick of George Bryant (cornet), William H. Jones (Trombone), Sidney Carter (clarinet), Albert Fredericks (2nd violin), Frank Jackson (bass), and William Fitzbutler (drums). The tour started in Braidwood, Illinois on January 26, 1904. After the tour, he did not return to his home in New Orleans, but instead settled in Omaha, Nebraska, a city which caught his interest during his tour.

== Later career ==
In Omaha, he worked as a janitor and continued his music, quickly creating a band with William Lewis as manager. Desdunes also managed the Commercial Club Billiard Room with Lewis as head waiter and Holland Harrold as head page. In 1906, he opened a dancing club for parties and social functions at Fraternal Hall (formerly Metropolitan Hall) on 14th and Dodge in Omaha. Desdunes was a member and frequently an officer of the Colored Commercial Club. Other officers included Thomas P. Mahammitt and John Albert Williams. When the club was organized in 1919, E.W. Pryor was president, J. H Hutton was vice president, Amos P. Scroggs was secretary, and Dan Desdunes was treasurer.

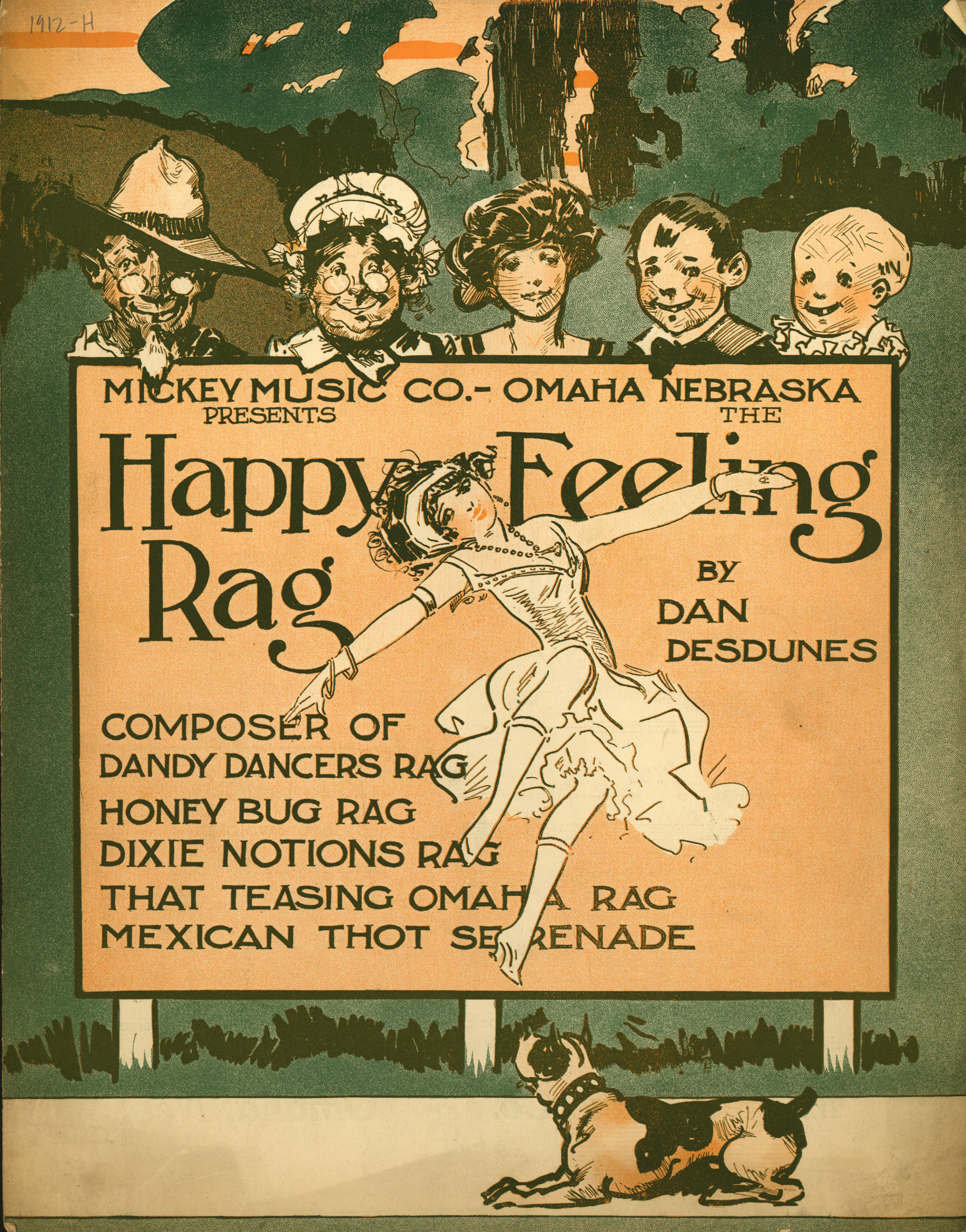
1912 Cover for Piano Sheet Music of "Happy Feeling Rag" by Dan Desdunes

In 1908, touring with the Knights of Pythias of North America, South America, Europe, Asia, Africa and Australiaband, his music received national attention when he took part in a battle of the bands at the national convention of the Negro Knights of Pythias at Convention Hall in Chicago. Receiving second place (first place was given to the Eighth Illinois National militia and third to O. T. Turner's band of St. Louis), Dan's performance was the crowd favorite and "lost only due to the judges adherence to musical and not popular qualities in their choice". In Omaha, he continued to arrange and write music. He put on a noted performance commemorating Emancipation, "Forty Years of Freedom" and used Omaha performers in his own minstrel shows, "Lady Minstrels," "Buster Brown", and "Manager Buster Brown". His compositions in this period were distinctly ragtime, sheet music for his "Happy Feeling Rag" was published in 1912 by Omaha's Mickey Music Company. Other pieces included "Dandy Dancers Rag," "Honey Bug Rag," "Dixie Notions Rag," "That Teasing Omaha Rag," "Mexican Thot Serenade," "Walkin' Dog", and "Polka de Concert".

Starting in 1910, Desdunes traveled with the annual trade tour of the Omaha Chamber of Commerce, a tour of Omaha business men through the Midwest to promote the city and he participated in trade tour annually until his death, over 20 years of tours. His band continued to tour after his death until at least 1956. Desdunes was a frequent performer in parades in Omaha. In 1928, after performing in a parade, he was invited to meet with a Minneapolis business man at an Omaha Hotel. When he arrived at the hotel, he was refused access to the elevator. Desdunes politely refused the freight elevator. Again, Desdunes was a central figure in a civil rights discussion, as Omaha NAACP leader John Albert Williams and R. W. Inness brought his case to the public in the Omaha World Herald In 1914, Desdunes also was musical director of Omaha's Du Bois Dramatic Club whose members included future member of the Nebraska House of Representatives, John Andrew Singleton.

Desdunes was one of the earliest Omaha bandleaders to identify their music as jazz: "According to Omaha historian Jesse J. Otto, the first mention of the word “jazz” in the Monitor was in a November 3, 1917, advertisement for a charity ball at which the music was to be provided by “Desdunes’ Jazz Orchestra.”" Also in 1917, the first jazz record, Livery Stable Blues, was released.

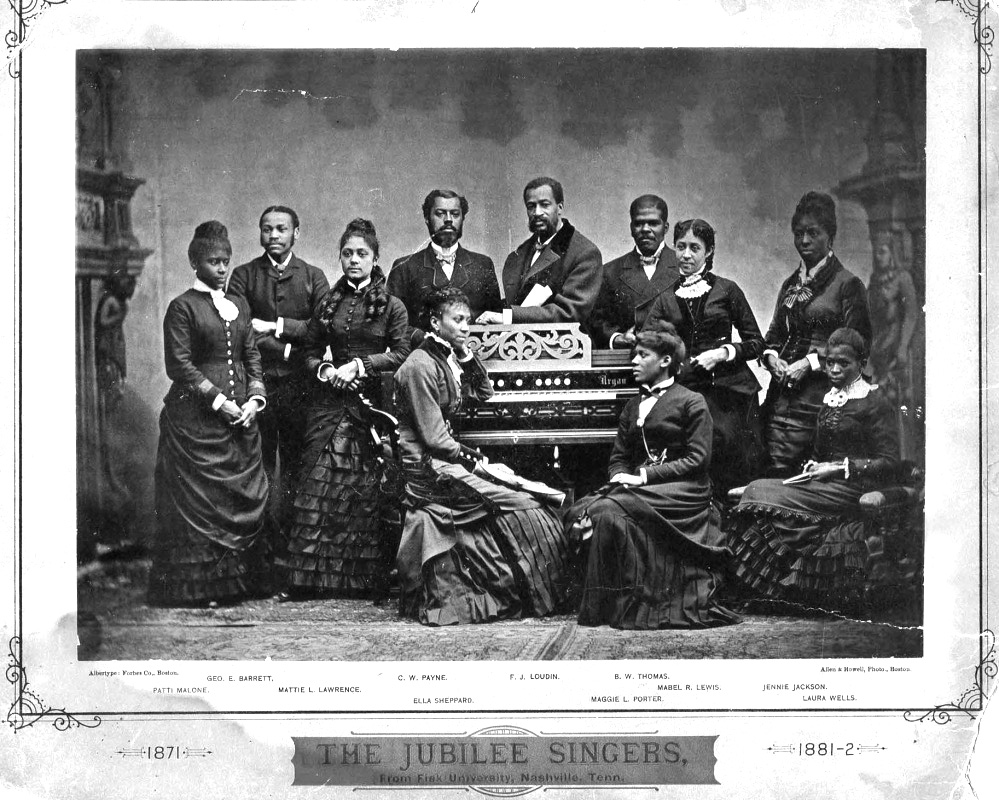
The Fisk Jubilee Singers in 1882

Desdunes music was very popular in musical sendoffs and among soldiers in WWI. They even took some pleasure in saying that Fort Desdunes, near Calais, was named for Dan, and that his music inspired their fighting. An early such concert included Celia Jewell (vocalist) of the Fisk Jubilee Singers, Perl Ray (vocalist), Flora Cassel Pinkston (piano), and Madamoselle Gaines (saxophone). The membership of Desdunes band in Omaha rotated somewhat, but consisted of at least 25, a number of which were registered in the draft. Jeff Smith was recruited in 1918 to play cornet for the band. Smith had toured with "The Pickaninny Band" of Wichita, the "Old Tennessee" company, and studied with Lowery's in Boston, played with Billy Kersands in the Hugo Brothers Minstrels, and with minstrel companies "the Alabama", "Eph Williams Troubadours", and "Campbell's New Orleans Minstrels". Jeff Smith was billed in the group as America's greatest colored cornet soloist. Other soloists in 1919 included J. Frank Terry on Trombone, and Harry Morton on baritone horn and vocalist. Desdunes' performances also included a saxophone quartet of Adams, Gaines, Terry, and Henry McGill.

Desdunes left the Chamber of Commerce, where he had been head of the billiard department for 15 years, on March 31, 1920, to allow for more time to focus on music. To supplement his income, he went into real estate with James A. Clark, head waiter at the University club.

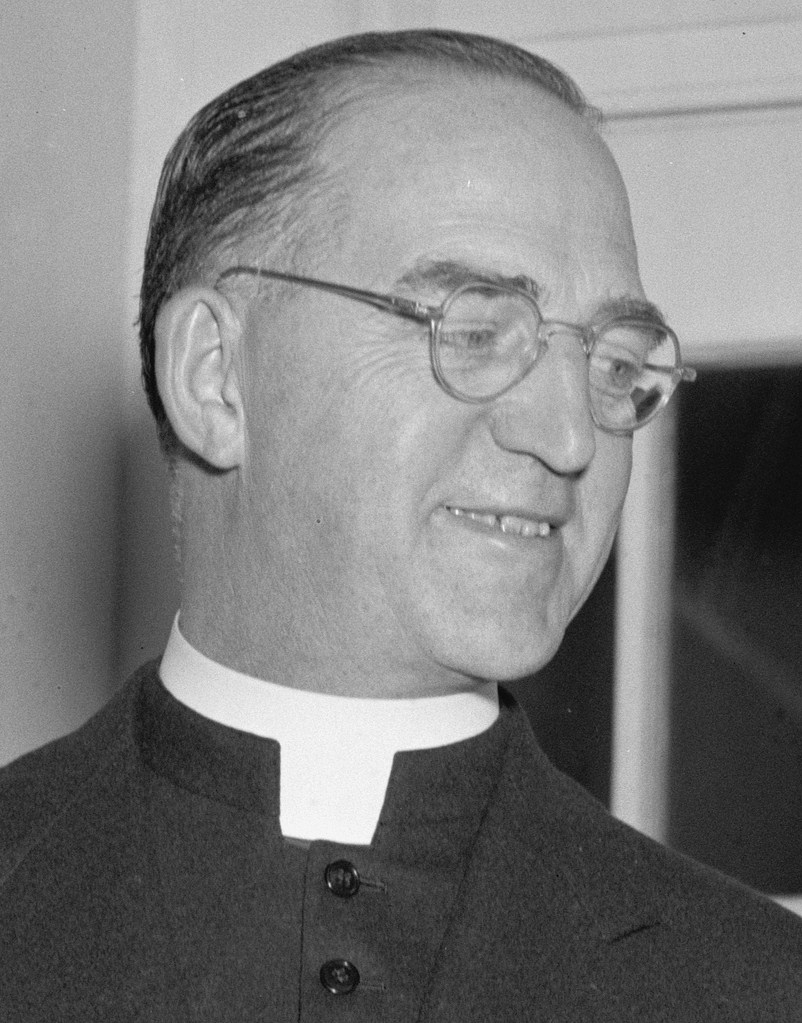
Boys Town founder Father Edward J. Flanagan

After the war, Desdunes was invited to teach music to the boys at Fr Edward Flanagan's Boys Town, an orphanage and home for at-risk boys that opened in 1917 and moved to its campus west of Omaha in 1921. In 1921, Desdunes was invited to teach the boys at Boys Town in music.

His first task was to put on a minstrel show, he chose twenty-five residents as performers, his band provided the music, and Desdunes wrote the script and music, choreographed the dancers, and directed the entire performance. Between 1922 and 1927, the group toured the country in the summers raising funds and entertaining audiences.

The band continued after Desdunes death, and Dan's son, Clarence, donated Dan's gold plated cornet to be given each year to the band's best musician. Desdunes's pedagogy stretched beyond Boys Town; on April 13, 1923, the Kansas City Call noted that Desdunes "has never been known to turn a deaf ear to the aspirations and hopes of any struggling musician. He is musical director of several organizations and schools."

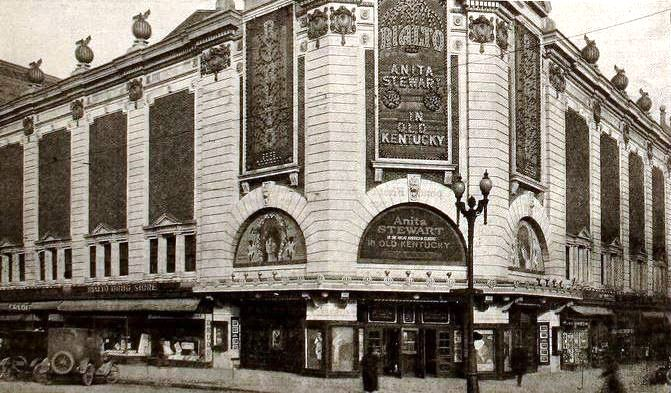
Rialto Theater in Omaha c1919

Dan's Knights of Pythias of North America, South America, Europe, Asia, Africa and Australia band continued to play through the 1920s, under the name of the "Knights of Pythias First Regimental Band", "Dan Desdunes' First Regimental Band", or "Dan Desdunes Band". In 1924, Billboard reported that the band was very popular and was especially noted for their performance of Robert Nathaniel Dett's "Listen to the Lambs". Later that year (on December 20, 1924) Billboard wrote: "The Dan Desdunes Band of Omaha, Neb., [...] has played more fairs, bazaars and celebrations than any other musical group of the [African-American] race in recent years, is taking a fling at the stage." That year his performers were: Irene Cochran (contralto), Levi Broomfield (tenor), Walter Bell (baritone); Jeff Smith, William Countee, Frank Perkins, Carl Daniels and James Francis (cornets); Robert Oliver, Theodore Adams, Leonard Gaines, Joseph Drake, E. Cook, Millard Lacey, Raymond Lattimore and Herbert Waldon (clarinets); Henry McGill, Thomas Roulette, Thomas Perkins and William Keeler (saxophones); Arty Watkins, Wallace Wright, Hubert Glover and Samuel Greylous (trombones); Harry Morton (baritone); Robert Brown, Harold Hoblins and John Pollard (horns); William Lewis, Ted Morton, A. G. Lancaster and Sherman Phillips (tubas); Holland Harrold, Simon Harrold and Charles Harrold (drums), Don Morton (comedy roller skater and saxophone), and Sam Grievous (reeds).

In 1925 his band put on the comedy "Husbands and Lovers" at Omaha's Rialto Theater. Desdunes owned and operated the Lake Theater for a time and in 1927 he organized a stock company and toured theater circuits for two years.

In 1925, Desdunes was hired to provide music for two lectures on "Americanism" put on by the Ku Klux Klan, the first of which would be on July 28 in Council Bluffs, Iowa with the Omaha World-Herald announcing he would play on July 20. Desdunes announced he would not play after all on July 25 after discussing the matter with some friends, and 2,000 people attended the first of these on July 28, 1925, at Bayliss Park in Council Bluffs. In a series of letters to the editor in the Herald representing a conversation between Harrison J. Pinkett and P. G. Beach, Beach argued that Desdunes' initial decision to play was evidence that the Klan was not a racist organization.

== Death ==
Dan caught a cold while performing with the Boys Town Band on April 20, 1929, and died of spinal meningitis on April 24, 1929. His funeral was held at St. Philip's Episcopal Church and services were said by John Albert Williams. He was buried at Forest Lawn Cemetery. William Lewis took over leadership of the band, with Clarence Desdunes and then George Bryant to follow. Nathan Bolton replaced Desdunes as leader of the Father Flanagan's Boys' Home band.

== Legacy ==
Omaha historian Jesse J. Otto cited testimony which noted that Dan Desdunes' New Orleans band was well known as early as 1892 for their "novelty" of "swinging the beat." This style is one of the defining characteristics of Jazz, thus this testimony places Desdunes as one of the first musicians in history to play Jazz. Otto also argues that Desdunes created a culture of teaching and nurturing in Omaha's African American community that produced artists like Lloyd Hunter, Preston Love, Wynonie Harris, Lester Abrams, Buddy Miles, and Luigi Waites, among others.

== See also ==
- Music in Omaha, Nebraska

== Elsewhere online ==
- "A biography of North Omaha's Dan Desdunes" by Adam Fletcher Sasse, NorthOmahaHistory.com.
