= Rodolphe Desdunes =

American poet

Rodolphe Lucien Desdunes
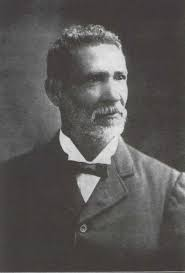
- Born: November 15, 1849; New Orleans, Louisiana, U.S.
- Died: August 14, 1928 (aged 78); Omaha, Nebraska, U.S.
- Education: Straight University
- Occupations: Customs Officer, Journalist, Historian
- Political party: Republican
- Spouses: Mathilde Cheval Denebourg; Clementine Walker

Rodolphe Lucien Desdunes (French pronunciation: [ʁɔdɔlf lysjɛ̃ dedyn]; November 15, 1849 – August 14, 1928) was a Louisiana Creole civil rights activist, poet, historian, journalist, and customs officer primarily active in New Orleans, Louisiana.

In Louisiana, Desdunes served as a militiaman during the Reconstruction era and fought in the Battle of Liberty Place. Later, he was a member of L'Union Louisianaise and wrote for the weekly of the same name. He also wrote for the daily paper, the Crusader, and taught at the Couvent School in New Orleans.

In 1890, Desdunes was among the founders of the Comité des Citoyens, which fought the 1890 Separate Car Act through legal challenges, leading to the US Supreme Court Case, Plessy vs Ferguson (1896). He also wrote an important French-language history of Creoles in America called Nos Hommes et Notre Histoire, the first such book written in French by a member of the Louisiana Creoles of Color.

Later in life he moved to Omaha, Nebraska, where his son Daniel had settled.

== Life ==
Rodolphe Lucien Desdunes was born November 15, 1849, as one of at least five children of Pierre Jérémie Desdunes and Henriette Angélique (Sonty) Gaillard; siblings were Pierre Aristide, Joseph, Elmore, and Sarazin.

Their father, Pierre, lived in New Orleans at least as early as 1840 and was probably born in the city. The Desdunes family were Saint Dominican Creole refugees who fled from Saint-Domingue (now Haiti) during the 1791 Haitian Revolution, at which time they gained asylum in New Orleans. Rodolphe's education was likely provided by family and family friends Armand Lanusse and Joanni Questy, as well as at the Couvent School.

Rodolphe's brother Pierre Aristide also became involved in civil rights as an adult. By profession, he was a poet, a cigar maker, a carpenter, and owner of a tobacco plantation. He fought in the American Civil War. He served on the board of directors of the Couvent School, which had been created by Marie Couvent in 1848. In 1873 Aristide married Louise Mathilde Denebourg.

Rodolphe married Mathilde Cheval, and they lived for some time with her mother, also named Mathilde. Before 1880, they had children Daniel (born in about 1873), Agnes (about 1873), Louise (about 1874), Coritza (born in 1876), and Wendelle (born winter 1876-1877). The Chevals may have descended from early Cheval settlers of the Tremé district, Pierre and Léandre.

In 1879, Rodolphe started a relationship with Clementine Walker, born in 1860 and a daughter of John and Ophelia Walker. Rodolphe and Clementine had at least four children, Mary Celine (March 25, 1879), John Alexander (1881), Louise (1889), and Oscar Alphonse (1892). Clementine died on September 23, 1893. Mary Celine later became known as Mamie Desdunes and was a blues pianist. Clementine lived near Jelly Roll Morton's godmother, and Jérémie and Henriette Desdunes were neighbors of Morton's mother. From this proximity, Morton learned the song he recorded as "Mamie's Blues" or "2:19 Blues" and attributed it to Mamie, singing, "Can’t give a dollar, give a lousy dime,/ I wanna feed that hungry man of mine." Other associates of Mamie included performer Bunk Johnson and promoters Hattie Rogers and Lulu White. Mamie married George Degay in 1898, and died of tuberculosis on December 4, 1911.

Oscar was also a musician. After his nephew Clarence's death in 1933, Oscar played with his band, the Joyland Revellers.

Rodolphe had three other daughters, possibly by Clementine, named Edna, Lucille, and Jeanne (born about 1893).

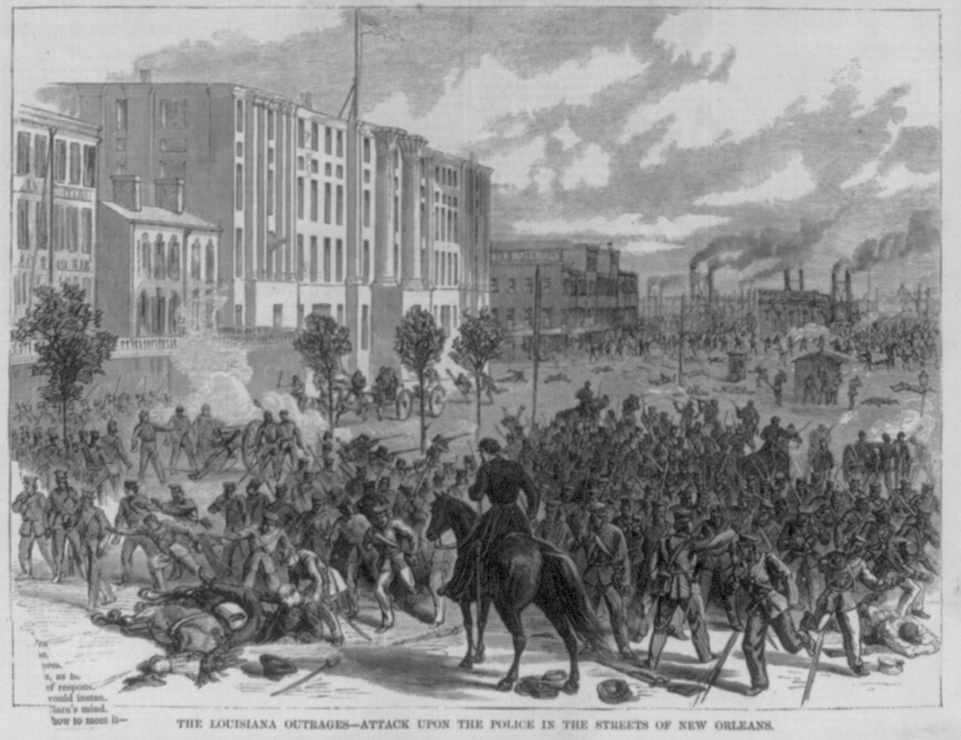
The "Louisiana Outrages", as illustrated in Harper's Weekly, 1874. Clash between the (racially integrated) Police and the (segregationist) White League on Canal Street

=== Militia ===
In the early 1870s during Reconstruction, Desdunes was a member of the New Orleans Police Department. In 1874, under the command of former Confederate General and then adjutant general of the Louisiana Militia James Longstreet, Desdunes was among the injured in the Battle of Liberty Place, fought between the pro-Republican city, state, and federal forces, and a pro-Democratic, largely ex-Confederate group called the White League. His experience was important to him. He remained a strong supporter of the rights and honors due to the black veterans of the United States Civil War.

== Political and civil service ==
Desdunes began to attend law courses at Straight University in the early 1870s. He graduated with a Bachelors of Law from Straight University in the spring of 1882.

Desdunes was appointed in 1879 as secretary of the parish vice committee upon the resignation of Charles A. Baquie., was an active member of the Odd Fellows, and translated rituals of his lodge, La Creole, into French. Also, he was a member of Lodge Amité Sincere No. 27.

In 1891 he was elected secretary of the Republican state central committee in Louisiana. He was a frequent contributor to Republican politics. In 1892, he was a speaker in a Louisiana Republican organizational rally, calling on blacks to support more moderate candidates with strong Louisiana ties. In 1897, Desdunes's activity included the support of Louisiana State Senator Henry Demas, denouncing lynching, calling for more schools, opposing the poll tax, and denouncing the constitutional convention, which he felt sought to deprive black suffrage. He was a member of the Republican Committee until 1900.

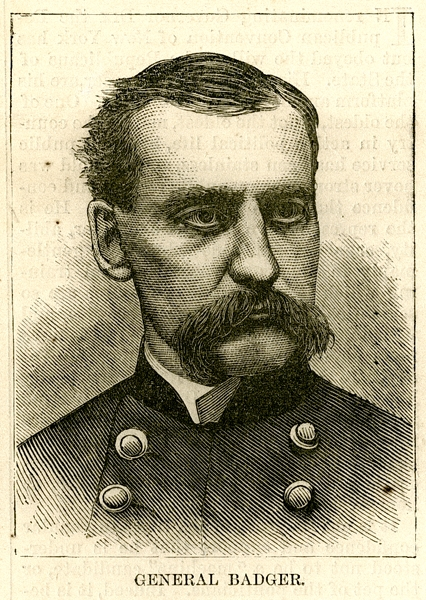
Image of Algernon Sidney Badger during the Civil War

From 1870 to 1885, Desdunes worked for the U.S. Customs Service in New Orleans as a messenger and as a clerk. He also worked at the Customs office from 1891 to 1896, and from 1899 to 1912. In 1880, Desdunes was appointed assistant cashier of the New Orleans Customhouse by Collector Algernon Sidney Badger. In 1891 Desdunes was appointed chief clerk of the sub treasury in New Orleans.

In 1908, as a part of his Customs department duties, Desdunes was supervising the weighing of cargo on a ship when granite dust blew into his eyes, blinding him. He retired the following year and moved to Omaha, Nebraska, to live with his son, Daniel, who was a musician and activist there.

== Civil rights activism ==
In the 1870s, Desdunes became involved in the pro-black rights Young Men's Progressive Association. As part of the Compromise of 1877, most of the federal troops were withdrawn from the South, enabling white supremacists to work more freely to suppress black rights. In 1878, the association, with Desdunes an officer and Thomas J. Boswell as president, were active in condemning lynchings: dozens of blacks had been killed in Louisiana in the 1870s. They noted the murders of Daniel Hill and Herman Bell of Ouachita Parish, Commodore Smallwood, Charles Carrol, John Higgins, and Washington Hill of Concordia Parish, Charles Bethel, Robert Williams, Munday Hill, James Stafford, Louis Postlewait, and William Henry of Tensas Parish.

In 1884, Rodolphe and his brother, Aristide, as well as Paul Trévigne, Arthur Estèves, and Louis André Martinet, as a part of a group called L'Union Louisiannais, reopened the Couvent School. Both Desdunes brothers served on the board of directors and Rodolphe also taught. In 1887, a French-language weekly paper was produced in New Orleans under the same name (L'Union Louisiannais) with Eugene Lucy (president), Homer Plessy (Vice President), Rodolphe Desdunes (recording secretary and solicitor), Pierre Chevalier (treasurer), and O. Bart (solicitor). In 1889, Martinet formed the Republican newspaper, the Crusader, and Desdunes was a frequent contributor. Publishing in both French and English, the Crusader took up the civil rights cause.

Desdunes was a part of the American Citizens' Equal Rights Association of Louisiana in 1890, protesting to the state assembly against legislation that imposed second-class status on blacks. He also wrote for other papers in Louisiana, such as the Business Herald in Donaldsonville in 1904.

=== Comité des Citoyens ===
Desdunes was incensed by the 1890 Separate Car Act, writing in an 1891 letter to the editor in the Crusader, "Among the many schemes devised by the Southern statesman to divide the races, none is so audacious and so insulting as the one which provides separate cars for black and white people on the railroads running through the state. It is like a slap in the face of every member of the black race, whether he has the full measure or only one-eighth of that blood." Aristide, Rodolphe and Daniel Desdunes, Louis Martinet, Eugene Luscy, Paul Bonseigneur, L. J. Joubert, P. B. S. Pinchback, Caesar Antoine, Homer Plessy and others formed the Comité des Citoyens to organize black civil rights efforts. Rodolphe enlisted his eldest son, Daniel, to violate the act to allow for its challenge in the courts. On February 24, 1892, Daniel boarded a train bound for Mobile, Alabama. While stopped at the corner of Elysian Fields and Claiborne in New Orleans, Daniel was arrested. However, Judge John Howard Ferguson ruled that the Separate Car Act could not be enforced for interstate travel because the US Constitution granted the federal government the authority to regulate only interstate travel and commerce.

The Comité then challenged the law again, this time focusing on intrastate travel, and Plessy volunteered to break the law. Luscy, Bonseignure, Rodolphe Desdunes, Joubert, and Martinet secured Plessy's release on bail that same day. When the case, Plessy vs. Ferguson, finally reached the U. S. Supreme Court in 1896, it was found that Plessy's rights had not been violated, Desdunes writing, "our defeat sanctioned the odious principle of the segregation of the races." The Comité des Citoyens activists Albion Tourgee and James C. Walker defended in both cases. About that time, both the Comité and the Crusader disbanded.

== Historian and poet ==
To the French High Commission (Hommage de la population de couleur/ tribute from the coloured people.)

Messieurs:
Sirs, Heros, Vous qui Venez de la France lointaine,
You Heroes, you coming from distant France,

Vous, defenseurs du droit et de la libert[é];
You defensors of the rule of law and liberty,

Des humbles descendants de la race Africaine,
You humble descendants of the African race

Veuillez bien accueillir l'hommage merit[é]
Please receive this well deserved tribute

Nous, aussi, nous voulons temoigner a la France,
We as well, we want to entrust France

Au nom de l'avenir, du present, du pass[é],
In the name of the future, the present and the past

Nos sinceres souhaits, notre reconnaissance,
With our sincere wishes and gratitude,

Tel que, de tous les temps, notre ame la pense.
As, for all times, our soul conceives it.

Nous avons admir[é] l'illustre Lafayette,
We have admired the illustrious Lafayette,

Le Divin Lamartine et le sublime Hugo,
The Divine Lamartine and the sublime Hugo,

De nos Dumas, la France est seule qui s'inquiete,
Of our Dumas, France is the only one to care,

Qui, par amour du bien, sait consacrer le beau.
Whom, by love of the good, knows how to acknowledge the beautiful.

Rodolphe Desdunes

Desdunes was very interested in the history and art of Creoles in Louisiana. From July through October 1895, Desdunes published translated excerpts from Joseph Saint-Rémy’s five volume work, Pétion et Haïti, for the New Orleans Crusader. Just before losing his sight, Desdunes finished a book about the contribution of Creoles to Louisiana history, Nos Hommes et Notre Histoire, which was published in Quebec in 1911. In the book, Desdunes uses personal reminiscences and scholarly biography to explore the lives of remarkable men in letters, fine arts, music, war, peace, and teaching. The story starts with the role of free black soldiers under General Andrew Jackson in the Battle of New Orleans in the War of 1812 and continues to explore the contribution of creoles to Louisiana and to the United States. It contrasts this with the hatred, contempt, and injustice that were faced by the men described and all blacks faced. In this way, Desdunes' work follows the example of La Campagne De 1814-15 by Hippolyte Castra, a commonality that Desdunes points out by including Castra and Castra's activities in his book. The introduction of the original edition was written by Louis Martin.

In Omaha, he continued to work on his poetry, submitting his work to various outlets. He also became close to others in the Omaha black community, particularly Father John Albert Williams, who praised Desdunes as "Omaha's Blind Negro Poet" in the Omaha World-Herald. His poems in the Herald included praise for black soldiers serving in World War I, "To the French High Commission (Hommage de la population de couleur.)", and a tribute to Nebraska entitled "Aksarben, Eloge", both of which appeared in 1917.

== Death ==
He lived in his own house in Omaha with his wife, and died on August 14, 1928, of cancer of the larynx. His remains were sent to New Orleans and he was interred in a family tomb in St. Louis Cemetery No. 2.
