= East Louisiana Railroad =

Defunct railroad in Louisiana and Mississippi, United States

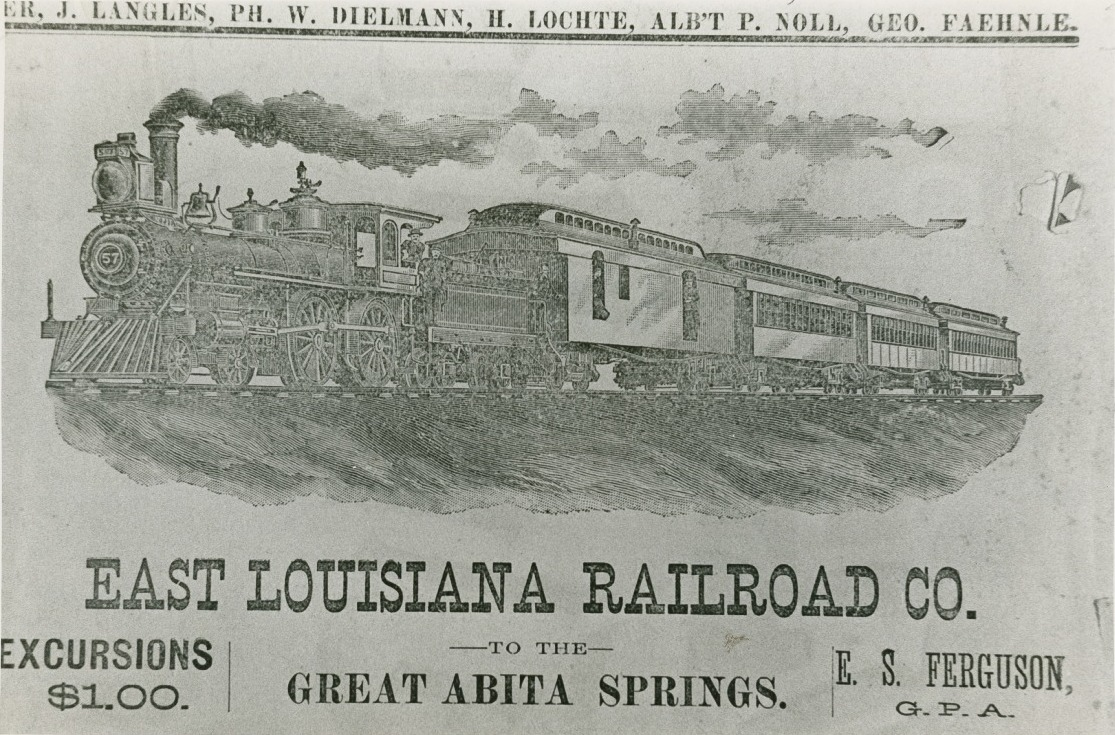
- Advertisement for the Company, c. 1891

Overview
- Dates of operation: 1887–1905
- Successor: New Orleans Great Northern Railroad

Technical
- Track gauge: 4 ft 8 1/2 in (1,435 mm) standard gauge
- Length: 55 miles (89 km)

The East Louisiana Railroad (officially the East Louisiana Railroad Company), chartered in 1887, was a railroad in Louisiana and Mississippi, United States. It was formed to connect Pearl River, Louisiana, to Covington, Louisiana, and Lake Pontchartrain.

The company played a key role in the 1896 case of Plessy v. Ferguson by arranging for Homer Plessy, a black man, to board a whites-only passenger car. In 1889, the company chartered trains to a boxing match between John L. Sullivan and Jake Kilrain. In 1905, it was merged into the New Orleans Great Northern Railroad.

== History ==
The East Louisiana Railroad was chartered on July 8, 1887, with authorization to connect Pearl River and Covington, along with "such points or places in the states of Louisiana and Mississippi, as also to such points or places on Lake Pontchartrain as the board of directors ... may determine".

In 1896, the East Louisiana Railroad worked with Homer Plessy, a Louisiana resident, to challenge Louisiana's Separate Car Act, which mandated racial segregation in railroad passenger cars. Plessy, who was one-eighth Black, arranged with the railroad to board an East Louisiana Railroad train and enter a whites-only car and inform a conductor of his race, upon which a private detective would be on hand to arrest Plessy when he refused to move to the Black-only car. When Plessy told the conductor his race, and then refused to leave the car, the train was stopped and the conductor and private detective removed him from the train. A number of railroad companies in Louisiana were opposed to the law because it was more expensive to provide separate railroad cars for different races, including the East Louisiana Railroad, which tacitly supported Plessy's efforts to have the law overturned, culminating in the Supreme Court Case Plessy v. Ferguson. Plessy and his supporters in the Comité des Citoyens ultimately sought to overturn Jim Crow laws and by extension racial segregation in the United States with the court case, but were unsuccessful.

In 1889, the East Louisiana Railroad played a key role in a fight between boxers John L. Sullivan and Jake Kilrain. The company offered to build a new amphitheater along its line in Abita Springs, with a capacity of 2,000 spectators. For the fight, the railroad operated three specially chartered passenger trains from New Orleans to the location of the fight, which occurred in Richburg, Mississippi.

The East Louisiana Railroad was merged into a newly formed company, the New Orleans Great Northern Railroad, in 1905.
