= New Orleans Great Northern Railroad =

Overview
- Headquarters: Bogalusa, Louisiana
- Locale: Southern United States
- Dates of operation: 1905–1933
- Predecessor: None
- Successor: Gulf, Mobile & Northern (GMN) took control in 1929, Gulf, Mobile and Ohio (GMO)

Technical
- Track gauge: 4 ft 8 1/2 in (1,435 mm) standard gauge
- Length: 284.6 miles (458.0 km)

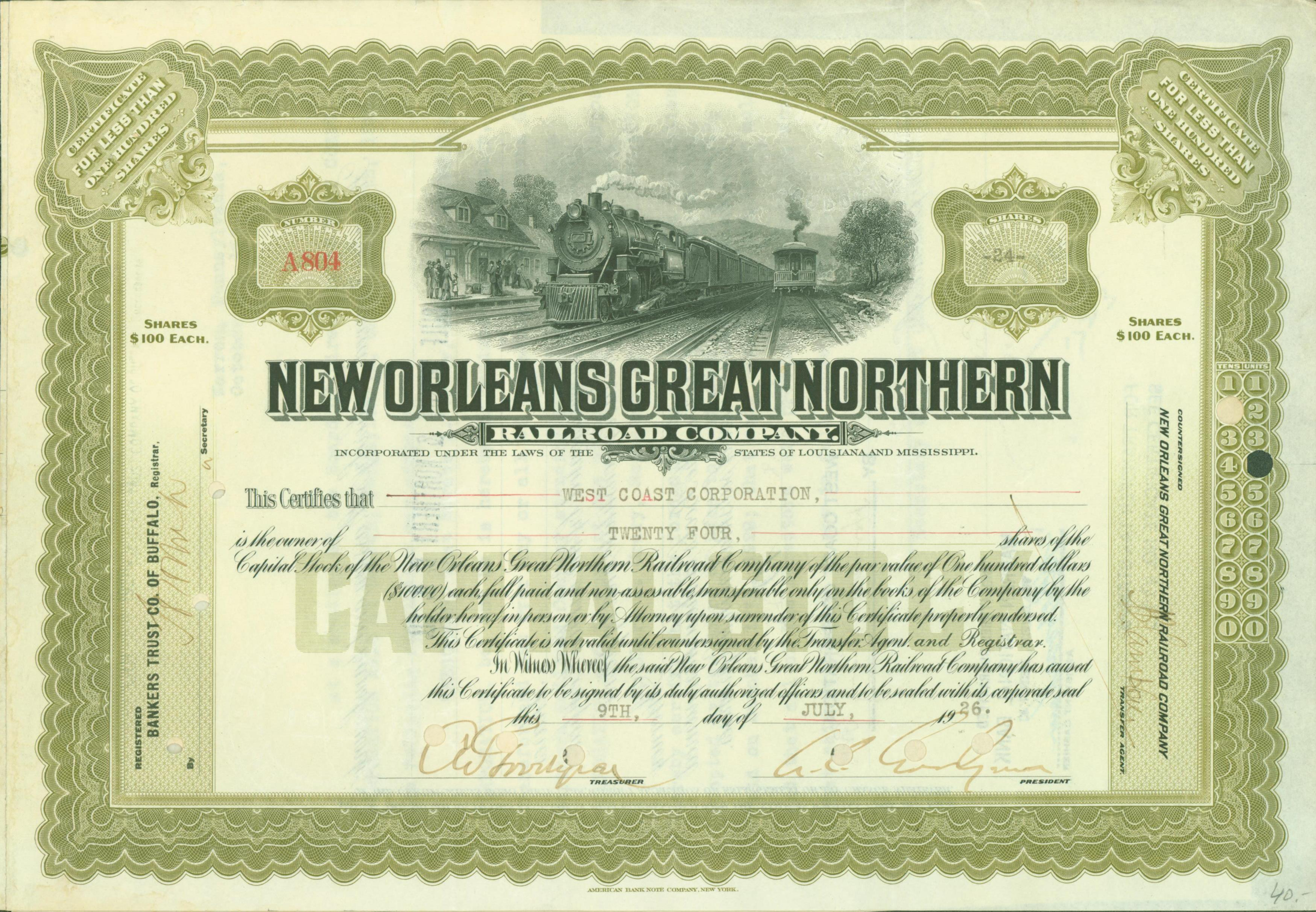
Share of the New Orleans Great Northern Railroad Company, issued 9 July 1926

The New Orleans Great Northern Railroad (NOGN) was chartered in Louisiana and Mississippi by the Great Southern Lumber Company in 1905 to service the mill and town of Bogalusa, Louisiana and move lumber to the northern market. The two companies merged, and NOGN acquired East Louisiana Railroad the same year.

== History ==
Frank and his brother Charles Goodyear founded the Great Southern Lumber Company, which began operating in 1908. Building the mill and work camp that would become Bogalusa required lumber, which, when completed, needed a way to be marketed. The brothers founded the New Orleans Great Northern railroad in Louisiana and Mississippi in 1905.

=== East Louisiana Railway ===
In June 1905, the East Louisiana Railway was acquired. that railway ran along the shoreline from Pearl River, west to Mandeville, then Covington. The east terminus was at North Slidell. Whistle stops, some becoming communities and towns along this route include Hygeia, Oaklawn, Lacombe, Forest Glen, Nott, Mandeville, Ozone Park, Abita Springs, Clairborne, Covington, Ramsay, Pfalzheim, Red Bluff, Hood, Onville, and Folsome.

=== Louisiana ===
The Southern Railroad provided track rights between Bogalusa and Slidell. The railroad was originally the New Orleans and Northeastern Railroad, before becoming the Alabama Great Southern Railroad, both (as well as the Cincinnati, New Orleans & Texas Pacific) were subsidiaries of the Southern Railroad.

Whistle stops, with some becoming communities and towns along the NOGN route were New Orleans (Terminal Station), Slidell, North Slidell (Shoreline Junction), Amos, Ironsboro (Maud, Louisiana 1911G), Florenville, Louisiana (Florenville Junction), Wortham, Graham, Talisheek, Bush, Sun (Gravelpit), Rio, Piercefield, (Pierce & Pounds Mill circa 1907), Lees Creek, Bogalusa, Mitch, Lipscomb, Marston, Piggotts, Varnado, Bellamy, Acme, and Angie.

=== Mississippi ===
The Mississippi route (1910) ran from Twin, Mississippi, Sandy Hook, Hickman, Cheraw, Jamestown, West Columbia, Claude, Lenoir, Tilton, Folwell, Monticello, Wanilla, Oma, Rockport, Georgetown, Hopwell, Gatesville, Rosemary, Byram, Elton, Nogan, and Jackson.

=== Bogue Chitto branch ===
The Bogue Chitto branch consisted of 105.6 miles of track. Stops were from New Orleans, Floronville, Rio, Isabel, Zona, Pinecliff, Jenkins, Franklinton, Clifton, Warnerton, Lexie, and Tylertown.

=== Later history ===
By 1929, the NOGN was failing. The Gulf, Mobile & Northern (GMN) acquired control in 1929. When the Gulf, Mobile and Ohio Railroad acquired the GMN, the NOGN officially ceased existence circa 1933.

== Train depots ==
The Slidell station, built in 1913, was shared by the NONE and the NOGN. The company leased Depot rights in New Orleans from the NONE.
