= Albion W. Tourgée =

American civil rights activist

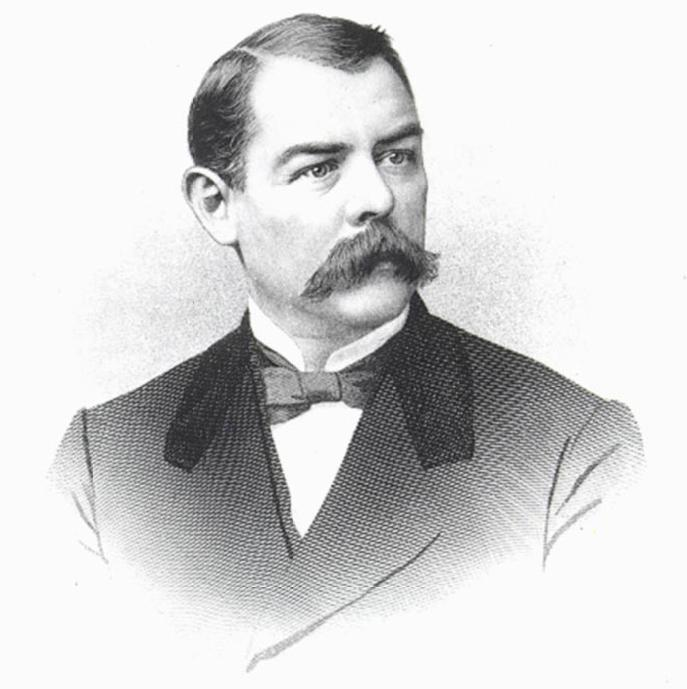
- Born: Albion Winegar Tourgée; May 2, 1838; Williamsfield, Ohio, US
- Died: May 21, 1905 (aged 67); Bordeaux, France
- Education: University of Rochester
- Occupations: Jurist, politician
- Known for: Plessy v. Ferguson, National Citizens' Rights Association, founder of Bennett College
- Political party: Republican
- Spouse: Emma Doiska Kilbourne (m. 1863)

Albion Winegar Tourgée (May 2, 1838 – May 21, 1905) was an American soldier, lawyer, writer, politician, and diplomat. Wounded in the Civil War, he relocated to North Carolina afterward, where he became involved in Reconstruction activities. He served as a delegate to the state constitutional convention in 1868 and served six years as a judge on the Superior Court. Tourgée was also a pioneer civil rights activist who founded the National Citizens' Rights Association (a precursor of the NAACP) and Bennett College as a normal school for freedmen in North Carolina – it has been a women's college since 1926. Tourgée represented Tabitha Ann Holton in her case before the Supreme Court of North Carolina; she applied for and became the first female lawyer in North Carolina and in the Southern United States.

An ally of African Americans since his Civil War days, later in his career Tourgée was asked to aid a committee in New Orleans that was challenging segregation on railways in Louisiana, and he was appointed the lead attorney in the landmark Plessy v. Ferguson (1896) case. The committee was dismayed when the United States Supreme Court ruled that "separate but equal" public facilities were constitutional; this enabled segregation for decades. Historian Mark Elliott credits Tourgée with introducing the metaphor "color blind justice" into legal discourse.

== Early life ==
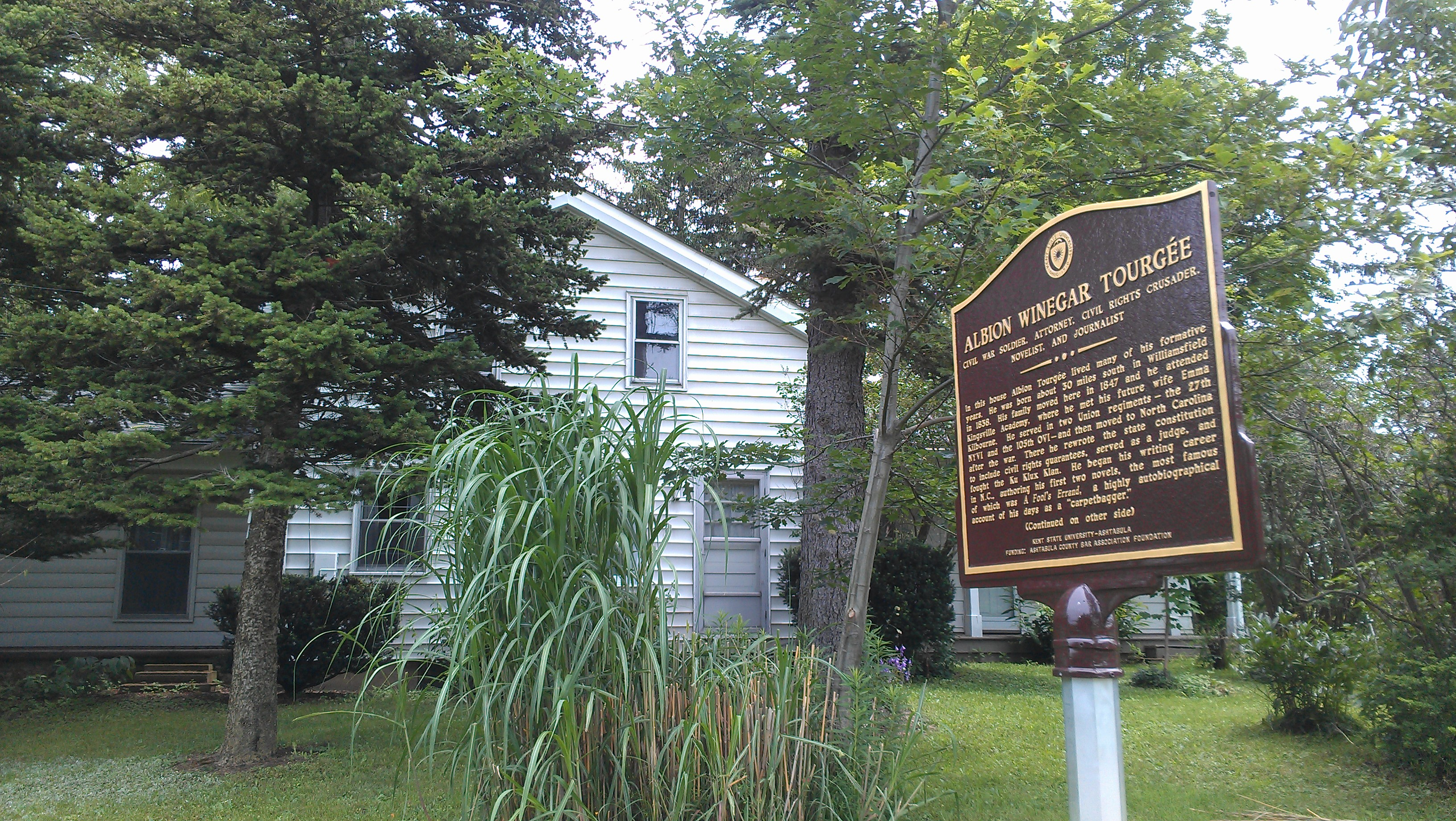
Historical marker in front of Albion Tourgée's boyhood home near Kingsville, Ohio; marker placed in May 2015

Born in rural Williamsfield, Ohio, on May 2, 1838, Tourgée was the son of farmer Valentine Tourgée and his wife Louisa Emma Winegar. His mother died when he was five. He attended common schools in Ashtabula County and in Lee, Massachusetts, where he lived for two years with an uncle.

Tourgée entered the University of Rochester in 1859. He showed no interest in politics until the university attempted to ban the Wide Awakes, a paramilitary campaign organization affiliated with the Republican Party. Tourgée took on the administration and succeeded in reaching a compromise with the university president. Due to lack of funds, he had to leave the university in 1861, before completing his degree. He taught school to save money in order to return to Rochester.

After the outbreak of the Civil War in April of the same year, Tourgée enlisted in the 27th New York Volunteer Infantry before completing his collegiate studies. Tourgée was awarded an A.B. degree in absentia in June 1862, as was a common practice at many universities for students who had enlisted before completing degrees.

== Military service ==
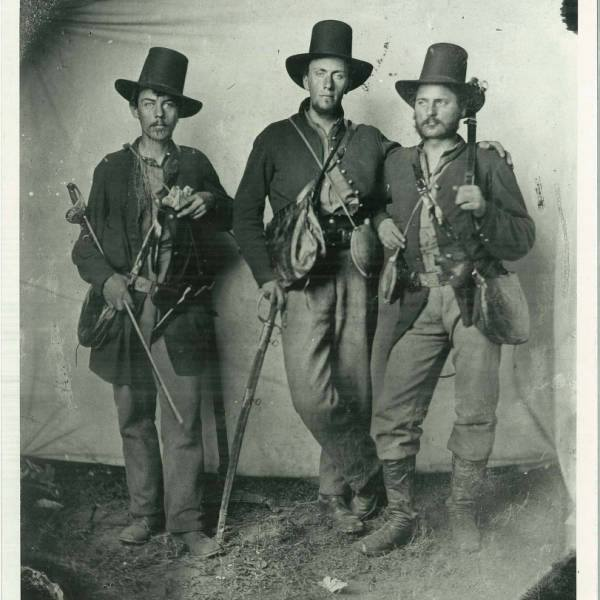
On the left: Lt. Albion W Tourgée, 105th Ohio Volunteer Infantry, in 1863

Fighting in the First Battle of Bull Run, the first major battle of the war, Tourgée was wounded in the spine when he was accidentally struck by a Union gun carriage during retreat. He suffered temporary paralysis and a permanent back problem that plagued him for the rest of his life. Upon recovering sufficiently to resume his military career, he was commissioned as a first lieutenant in the 105th Ohio Volunteer Infantry. At the Battle of Perryville, he was again wounded.

On January 21, 1863, Tourgée was captured near Murfreesboro, Tennessee and was held as a prisoner of war in Libby Prison in Richmond, Virginia, before his exchange on May 8, 1863. He rejoined Union forces and resumed his duties and fought at the battles of Chickamauga and Chattanooga. Under pressure from the military because of his medical condition, Tourgée resigned his commission on December 6, 1863.

He returned to Ohio, where he married Emma Doiska Kilbourne, his childhood sweetheart. They had one child.

== Reconstruction era ==
After the war, Tourgée studied law as an apprentice with an established firm, 90 and gained entrance to the Ohio bar. The Tourgée couple soon moved to Greensboro, North Carolina, where he could live in a warmer climate better suited to his war injuries. While there, he established himself as a lawyer, farmer, and editor, working for the Republican newspaper, the Union Registrar. In 1866, he attended the Convention of the Southern Loyalists, where he unsuccessfully attempted to pass a resolution for African-American suffrage.

Considered by locals to be a carpetbagger because he had come from the North, Tourgée participated in several roles during Reconstruction. He drew on this period for some later novels. In 1868 he was elected to represent Guilford County at the state constitutional convention, which was dominated by Republicans. Tourgée was influential at the convention, shaping its determinations on the judiciary, local government, and public welfare. He successfully advocated for equal political and civil rights for all citizens; ending property qualifications for jury duty and officeholding; requiring popular election of all state officers, including judges; founding free public education; abolishing the use of whipping posts as punishment for persons convicted of crimes; judicial reform; and uniform taxation.

Tourgée was elected to the 7th District superior court as a judge, serving from 1868 to 1874. During this period he confronted the increasingly violent Ku Klux Klan, which was very powerful in his district and had members who repeatedly threatened his life. During this time, Tourgée was also appointed as one of three commissioners in charge of codifying North Carolina's previously dual law-code system into one. The new codified civil procedures, at first strongly opposed by the state's legal practitioners, proved in time the most flexible, and informal system in the Union. Among his other activities, Tourgée served as a delegate to the 1875 state constitutional convention and ran a losing campaign for Congress in 1878.

== Literary life ==
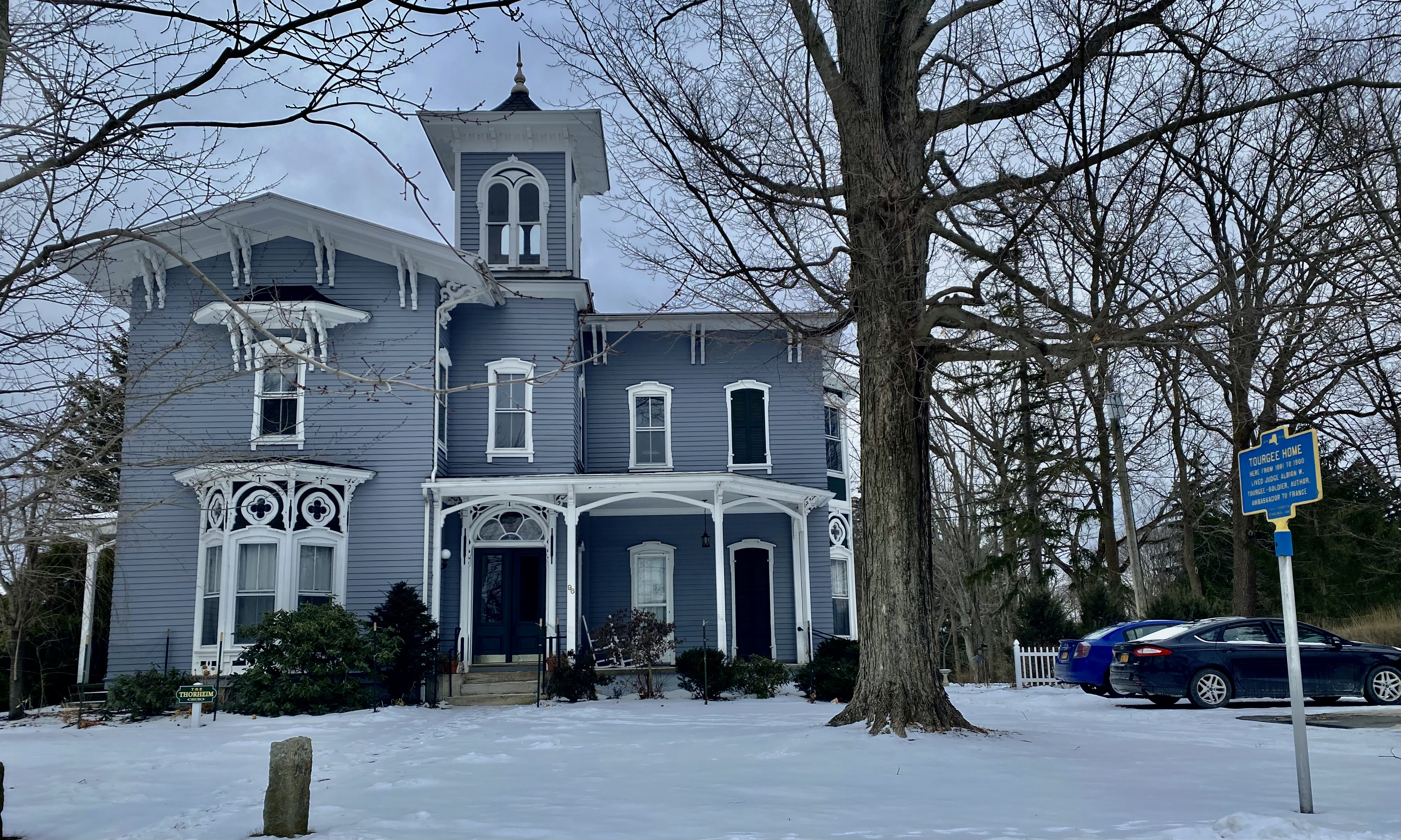
The house in Mayville, New York, where Tourgée lived from 1881 until his posting to the French consulate in 1900

Albion's first literary endeavor was the novel Toinette, written between 1868 and 1869 while he was living in North Carolina. It was not published until 1874, and then under the pseudonym "Henry Churton". It was renamed A Royal Gentleman when it was republished in 1881.

Financial success came after his novel A Fool's Errand, By One of the Fools was published in 1879. Based on his experiences of Reconstruction, the novel sold 200,000 copies. Its sequel, Bricks Without Straw (1880), also was a bestseller. It was unique among contemporary novels by white men about the South, as it presented events from the viewpoints of freedmen, and depicts promises of freedom narrowed by postwar violence and discrimination against freedmen.

In 1881, Tourgée and his family returned north to Mayville, New York, near the Chautauqua Institution in the western part of the state. He made his living as writer and editor of the literary weekly The Continent, but it failed in 1884.

He wrote many more novels and essays in the next two decades, many set in the Lake Erie region to which he had relocated. These included Button's Inn (1887), a novel about early Mormons, who founded their religion in the western part of New York. Called the "Burned Over District", this area was a center of religious fervor in the 19th century. One of his books explored social justice from a Christian perspective; this thought-provoking and controversial novel, Murvale Eastman: Christian Socialist, was published in 1890.

== Plessy v. Ferguson case ==
Near the end of the 19th century, the Southern states had become dominated by white Democrats. The legislatures began to pass new constitutions (beginning with Mississippi in 1890) and laws to raise barriers to voter registration to suppress the black Republican vote and to impose legal segregation in public facilities. Louisiana passed an 1890 law intended "to promote the comfort of passengers" by requiring all state railway companies "to provide equal but separate accommodations for the white and colored races, by providing separate coaches or compartments" on their passenger trains.

In September 1891 a group of prominent black leaders in New Orleans, made up of mostly men who had been free people of color before the Civil War, organized a "Citizens' Committee" to challenge this law on federal constitutional grounds. To assist them in their challenge, this group retained the legal services of "Judge Tourgée," as he was popularly known.

Perhaps considered the nation's most outspoken white Radical on the "race question" in the late 1880s and 1890s, Tourgée had called for resistance to the Louisiana law in his widely read newspaper column, A Bystander's Notes. Written for the Chicago Republican (later known as the Chicago Daily Inter Ocean and after 1872 known as the Chicago Record-Herald), his column was syndicated in many newspapers across the country. Largely as a consequence of this column, "Judge Tourgée" had become well known in the black community for his bold denunciations of lynching, segregation, disfranchisement, white supremacy, and scientific racism. He was the first choice of the New Orleans Citizens' Committee's to lead their legal challenge to the new Louisiana segregation law.

As they developed their challenge, Tourgée played a strategic role, for instance suggesting that a light-skinned, mixed-race African American challenge the law. Dan Desdunes, the son of prominent Citizens Committee leader Rodolphe Desdunes, was initially selected, but his case was thrown out because he had been a passenger on an interstate train, where the court ruled that state law did not apply. Homer Plessy was selected next. He was arrested after boarding an intrastate train and refusing to move from a white to a "colored" car.

Tourgée, who was lead attorney for Homer Plessy, first deployed the term "color blindness" in his briefs in the Plessy case. He had used it on several prior occasions on behalf of the struggle for civil rights. Tourgée's first use of "color blindness" as a legal metaphor has been documented decades before, while he was serving as a Superior Court judge in North Carolina. In his dissent in Plessy, Justice John Marshall Harlan borrowed the metaphor of "color blindness" from Tourgée's legal brief.

== Later life ==
In the wake of an 1892 lynching in Memphis known as the Peoples Grocery lynching, anti-lynching activist Ida B. Wells wrote about the case. After the Memphis Commercial accused her of inciting the incident, she asked Tourgee to represent her in a libel case against the newspaper. Tourgée had largely retired from law (with the exception of his work with the New Orleans "Citizens' Committee") and refused. Tourgée recommended that Wells contact his friend, Ferdinand Lee Barnett, and Barnett agreed to take the case.

This may have been Barnett's introduction to Wells. They married two years later. Barnett came to agree with Tourgée's assessment: that the case did not have a good chance of being won. He said that a black woman would never win such a case heard by an all-white, all-male jury in Memphis, and Wells withdrew her suit. Wells and Barnett married in 1895.

In 1897, following Tourgée's involvement in the Plessy case, President William McKinley appointed him as U.S. consul to France. He sailed to Bordeaux where he was based. About 1900, Tourgée joined the Military Order of the Loyal Legion of the United States, an influential Civil War veterans' organization of Union men who had been commissioned officers. He was assigned Companion No. 13949.

=== Death ===
Tourgée served in France until his death in Bordeaux on May 31, 1905. He had been gravely ill for several months, but then appeared to rebound. The recovery was only brief, momentary, however, and he succumbed to acute uremia. The kidney damage was believed to be related to a Civil War wound.

Tourgée's ashes were interred at the Mayville Cemetery, in Mayville, New York. He is commemorated by a 12-foot granite obelisk inscribed thus: "I pray thee then Write me as one that loves his fellow-man."

== Books ==
=== Fiction ===
- Toinette (1874); republished as A Royal Gentleman (1884)
- Figs and Thistles: A Western Story (1879)
- A Fool's Errand (1879)
- Bricks Without Straw (1880)
- Zouri's Christmas (1881)
- John Eax and Marmelon; or, The South Without the Shadow (1882)
- Hot Plowshares (1883)
- The Veteran and His Pipe (1886)
- Button's Inn (1887)
- Black Ice (1888)
- With Gauge and Swallow, Attorneys (1889)
- Murvale Eastman, Christian Socialist (1890)
- Pactolus Prime (1890)
- '89 (1891)
- A Son of Old Harry (1892)
- Out of the Sunset Sea (1893)
- An Outing with the Queen of Hearts (1894)
- The Mortgage on the Hip-Roof House (1896)
- The Man Who Outlived Himself (1898) stories

=== Nonfiction ===
- The Code of Civil Procedure of North Carolina, with Barringer & Rodman (1878)
- An Appeal to Caesar (1884)
- Letters to a King (1888)
- Shall White Minorities Rule? (1889)
- The War of the Standards: Coin and Credit vs. Coin Without Credit (1896)
- The Story of a Thousand, Being a History of the 105th Volunteer Infantry, 1862-65 (1896)
- A Civil War Diary, ed by Dean H. Keller (post, 1965)

== Bibliography ==
- Mark Elliott, Color-Blind Justice: Albion Tourgée and the Quest for Racial Equality from the Civil War to Plessy v. Ferguson (2006).
- Michael Kent Curtis, "Tourgée" in The American National Biography. (2000)
- Otto Olsen, Carpetbagger's Crusade: The Life of Albion Winegar Tourgée (1965)
- Orth, John V.; Newby, Paul M. (2013). The North Carolina State Constitution (second ed.). Oxford University Press. ISBN 9780199300655.
- Roy F. Dibble, Albion W. Tourgée (1921)
- J. G. de Roulhac Hamilton, Reconstruction in North Carolina (1914)
- "Albion W. Tourgée Dead.", The New York Times, May 22, 1905, p. 7.
- Dictionary of North Carolina Biography, William S. Powell, Ed., "Albion Winegar Tourgee", (North Carolina Press 1979)
- Wilson, Edmund. Patriotic Gore: Studies in the Literature of the American Civil War, New York: Oxford University Press, 1962, pp. 529–548.
