= Comité des Citoyens =

New Orleans civil rights organization

The Comité des Citoyens (French: [kɔmite de sitwajɛ̃]; lit. 'Citizens' Committee') was a civil rights group made up of African Americans, whites, and Creoles. It is most well known for its involvement in Plessy v. Ferguson. The Citizens' Committee was opposed to racial segregation and was responsible for multiple demonstrations in which African Americans rode on the "white" cars of trains.

A prominent member of the group was Louis A. Martinet, a politician, journalist, and lawyer who is credited with much of the thinking behind their legal strategy.

== History ==
In 1890, the State of Louisiana passed the Separate Car Act, which required separate accommodations for Black and white people on railroads, including separate railroad cars. At the suggestion of Aristide Mary, a wealthy Creole landowner who was active in Louisiana's Reconstruction era politics, including running for governor in 1872, a group of 18 prominent black, creole of color, and white creole New Orleans residents met at the offices of The New Orleans Crusader, a black Republican newspaper, and formed the Comité des Citoyens to challenge the law. Many of the Crusader's staff were among the group's members, including the paper's publisher, Martinet, and the writer Rodolphe Desdunes. Mary's aim was to establish a "dignified" organization that would mount legal challenges to Louisiana's new segregation policies.

=== Plessy v. Ferguson ===
In 1892 by the Citizens' Committee recruited Homer Plessy, who was 1/8 African American, to violate the Separate Car Act. Additionally, the committee hired private Detective Chris C. Cain to arrest Plessy and ensure that he be charged for violating the Separate Car Act, as opposed to a misdemeanor such as disturbing the peace. Plessy sat in the "whites-only" passenger car. When the conductor came to collect his ticket, Plessy told him that he was 7/8 white and that he refused to sit in the "blacks-only" car. Plessy was immediately arrested by Detective Chris C. Cain, put into the Orleans Parish jail, and released the next day on a $500 bond.

The judge presiding over his case, John Howard Ferguson, ruled that Louisiana had the right to regulate railroad companies while they operated within state boundaries. The Citizens' Committee took Plessy's appeal to the Supreme Court of Louisiana, where he again found an unreceptive ear, as the state Supreme Court upheld Ferguson's ruling. The Committee appealed to the United States Supreme Court in 1896. In the seven-to-one decision handed down on May 18, 1896 (Justice David Josiah Brewer did not participate because of the recent death of his daughter), the Court rejected Plessy's arguments based on the Fourteenth Amendment, seeing no way in which the Louisiana statute violated it.

After the decision by the Supreme Court the Citizens' Committee stated, "We, as freemen, still believe that we were right and our cause is sacred." Plessy returned to Ferguson's court, pleaded guilty, and was sentenced to pay a $25 fine, which the Comité des Citoyens paid before disbanding.
