= Homer Plessy =

American activist (died 1925)

- Born: Homère Patris Plessy; 1858, 1862, or March 17, 1863; New Orleans, Louisiana, U.S.
- Died: March 1, 1925
- Occupations: Shoemaker, activist
- Known for: Plessy v. Ferguson

Homer Adolph Plessy (born Homère Patris Plessy; 1858, 1862 or March 17, 1863 (Note: Mamie Locke notes that Plessy may have been 34 at the time of the 1892 incident that led to the Plessy v. Ferguson case, placing his birth c. 1858, but also notes that Plessy's tombstone at Saint Louis Cemetery No. 1, New Orleans, claims that he was 63 years old when he died on March 1, 1925, placing his birth c. 1862. Mark Elliott claims that he was thirty in 1892, which implies a birthdate of 1861 or 1862. Thomas Brook places his birth in March 1862 without specifying a birthdate. Harvey Fireside claims that Plessy was in his "late twenties" in 1892 implying a birthdate of 1863 or later. Keith Medley claims that Plessy was born on Saint Patrick's Day, 1863 (i.e. March 17, 1863), and that his original middle name, Patris, was in honor of St. Patrick.) – March 1, 1925) was an American shoemaker and activist who was the plaintiff in the United States Supreme Court decision Plessy v. Ferguson. He staged an act of civil disobedience to challenge one of Louisiana's racial segregation laws and bring a test case to force the U.S. Supreme Court to rule on the constitutionality of segregation laws. The Court decided against Plessy. The resulting "separate but equal" legal doctrine determined that state-mandated segregation did not violate the Fourteenth Amendment to the United States Constitution as long as the facilities provided for both black and white people were putatively "equal". The legal precedent set by Plessy v. Ferguson lasted into the mid-20th century, until a series of landmark Supreme Court decisions concerning segregation, beginning with Brown v. Board of Education in 1954.

Plessy was born a free person of color in a family of French-speaking Louisiana Creole people. Growing up during the Reconstruction era, Plessy lived in a society in which black children attended integrated schools, black men could vote, and interracial marriage was legal. However, many of those civil rights were eroded following the withdrawal of U.S. federal troops from the former Confederate States of America in 1877. In the 1880s, Plessy became involved in political activism, and in 1892, the civil rights group Comité des Citoyens recruited him for an act of civil disobedience to challenge Louisiana's Separate Car Act, which required separate accommodations for black and white people on railroads. On June 7, 1892, Plessy purchased a ticket for a "whites only" first-class train coach, boarded the train, and was arrested by a private detective hired by the group. Judge John Howard Ferguson ruled against Plessy in a state criminal district court, upholding the law on the grounds that Louisiana had the right to regulate railroads within its borders. Plessy appealed to the U.S. Supreme Court, which heard the case four years later in 1896 and ruled 7–1 in favor of Louisiana, establishing the "separate but equal" doctrine as a legal basis for the Jim Crow laws which remained in effect into the 1950s and 1960s.

== Early life and historical context ==
Plessy may have been born in 1858, 1862, or on March 17, 1863, under the name Homère Patris Plessy. He was the second of two children in a French-speaking Creole family in New Orleans, Louisiana. Later documents give his name as Homer Adolph Plessy or Homère Adolphe Plessy. His father, a carpenter named Joseph Adolphe Plessy, and his mother, a seamstress named Rosa Debergue, were both mixed-race free people of color. Homer's paternal grandfather, Germain Plessy, was a white Frenchman born in Bordeaux circa 1777. Germain Plessy lived in the French Saint-Domingue colony, before moving to New Orleans during the 1790s as part of a group of thousands of European settlers who fled the Haitian Revolution. Germain Plessy later lived with Catherine Mathieu, a free woman of color of French and African ancestry, and they had eight children. According to pre-Civil War records, Homer's maternal grandparents were both of African descent or mixed race. Many of Homer's ancestors and relatives were property-owning tradesmen, including blacksmiths, carpenters, and shoemakers.

Joseph Adolphe Plessy died in 1869. Two years later in 1871, Homer's mother married Victor M. Dupart, a clerk for the U.S. Postal Service who supplemented his income by working as a shoemaker. Dupart had six children from a previous marriage; in addition to bringing Homer and his sister Ida to the marriage, Plessy's mother had one child with Dupart. Plessy's stepfather was politically engaged, having paid poll taxes in 1869 and 1870 in order to vote. He also joined the Unification Movement of 1873, a civil rights movement promoting political equality, racial unity, and an end to discrimination in Reconstruction-era Louisiana.

Keith Medley notes that Plessy grew up in a society in which black men had gained unprecedented civil rights in Louisiana. Beginning in 1868, all black men could vote if they paid a poll tax. The state implemented a racially integrated school system in 1869. The state legislature legalized interracial marriage in 1868. And more than 200 black men held elected offices at the state and local levels in the 1870s. However, Medley writes that many of those gains eroded following the withdrawal of U.S. federal troops from the former Confederacy in 1877. When white Democrats returned to power in the late 1870s, they began to defund public education for black people.

Plessy worked as a shoemaker and may have also done carpentry, according to a relative. During the 1880s, he worked at Patricio Brito's shoe-making business in New Orleans's French Quarter. He married nineteen-year-old Louise Bordenave at St. Augustine Church on July 14, 1888; Brito served as a witness. In 1889, he and his wife moved to Faubourg Tremé, a racially integrated middle-class neighborhood of New Orleans at the time, and he registered to vote in the Sixth Ward's Third Precinct. He was also a Freemason and served as Secretary of the Supreme Council of Louisiana of the Scottish Rite.

Medley writes that Plessy's political involvement began in the post-Reconstruction 1880s. In 1887, he served as vice-president of the fifty-person Justice, Protective, Educational, and Social Club, a group dedicated to reforming public education in New Orleans. Not only had Louisiana abolished racially integrated schools in 1879, but many of the public schools in New Orleans were unable to stay open in the 1880s due to a lack of funding. In response, the organization published a pamphlet declaring its intention to collect and build a community library and appealing to the Louisiana state government for "our fair share of public education" with safeguards against "fraud and manipulation, thereby insuring [sic] good teachers, a full term and all necessary articles for the maintenance of schools, which at this moment we have not."

There is no known photograph of Homer Plessy, though a photograph of P. B. S. Pinchback, a former governor of Louisiana, has been misattributed as Plessy.

== Plessy v. Ferguson ==
=== Orchestrating a test case ===
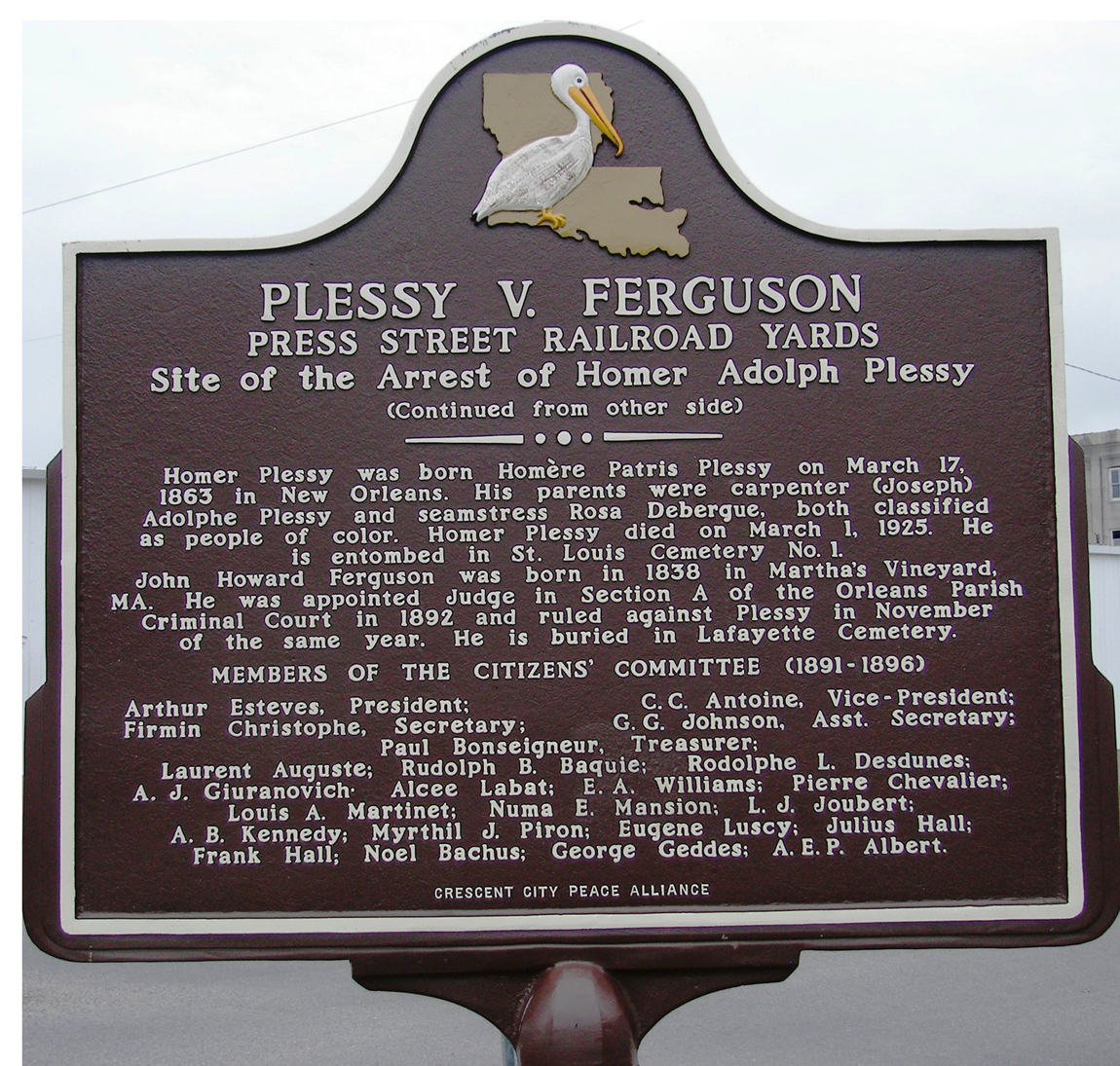
A placard marks the place in New Orleans where Chris C. Cain arrested Homer Plessy on June 7, 1892.

In 1890, the State of Louisiana passed the Separate Car Act, which required separate accommodation for black and white people on railroads, including separate railway cars. A group of 18 prominent black, creole of color, and white creole New Orleans residents formed the Comité des Citoyens (Committee of Citizens) to challenge the law. Many staff members of The New Orleans Crusader, a black Republican newspaper, were among the group's members, including publisher Louis A. Martinet, writer Rodolphe Desdunes, and managing editor L. J. Joubert, who served as president of the Justice, Protective, Educational, and Social Club at the same time Plessy was vice president.

The group contacted attorney and civil rights advocate Albion W. Tourgée, who agreed to help them bring a test case to court in order to force the judiciary to determine the constitutionality of Jim Crow laws. In his correspondence with Martinet, Tourgée suggested finding a plaintiff who had "not more than one-eight colored blood" and could pass as white. The attorney hoped that by selecting a person of ambiguous racial identity, he might exploit the Louisiana legislature's failure to define race and to force the court to consider the inconclusiveness of scientific evidence on definitive racial categories. In court, he later argued that a man of one-eighth African ancestry may not even know to which race he belongs, so a railroad employee would be even less qualified to "decide the question of race" and determine in what car a mixed-race individual ought to sit.

Tourgée also suggested finding a female plaintiff, because he believed the courts might be more sympathetic to a woman being ejected from a railroad car. However, the Comité des Citoyens instead recruited musician Daniel Desdunes, the son of group member Rodolphe Desdunes. Martinet contacted several railroad companies to inform them of the group's intentions. The railroads overwhelmingly opposed the Separate Car Act because it raised their operating costs by forcing them to use additional cars that might only be at half capacity. Some companies enforced the law, while others did not. Martinet eventually enlisted the Louisville and Nashville Railroad Company to participate in the group's plan. On February 24, 1892, Daniel Desdunes purchased a first-class ticket on a train bound for Mobile, Alabama. After he sat in a "whites only" car, the conductor stopped the train, and a private detective hired by the Comité des Citoyens arrested Desdunes. The prosecution dropped their case against Desdunes in May 1892, however, after the Louisiana State Supreme Court ruled that the Separate Car Act did not apply to interstate railroad trips.

In order to bring their test case to court, the Comité des Citoyens had to stage another incident on a train trip entirely within Louisiana state lines. They recruited Plessy, who may have been a friend of Rodolphe Desdunes, to be the plaintiff. Martinet contacted the East Louisiana Railroad, one of the companies that opposed the law, and declared their intentions to stage an act of civil disobedience. He also hired the services of private detective Chris C. Cain to arrest Plessy and ensure that he was charged with violating the Separate Car Act and not with a misdemeanor such as disturbing the peace.

On June 7, 1892, Plessy bought a first-class ticket on the East Louisiana Railroad running between the Press Street Depot in New Orleans and Covington, Louisiana, an approximately 30-mile journey that would have taken two hours. He sat in the "whites only" passenger car. When conductor J. J. Dowling, who was also in on the staged act, came to collect Plessy's ticket, he told Plessy to leave the "whites only" car. (Note: The Picayune reported that "the Conductor asked [Plessy] if he was a colored man. On the latter replying that he was, the conductor informed him that he would have to go into the car for colored people. This he refused to do..." The Crusader reported that "the conductor came up and asked if [Plessy] was a white man. Plessy, who is as white as the average white southerner, replied that he was a colored man. Then, said the conductor, 'you must go in the coach reserved for colored people.'" Historian Harvey Fireside writes that "Plessy handed his ticket to J. J. Dowling...Then he spoke the words that he had carefully rehearsed: 'I have to tell you that, according to Louisiana law, I am a colored man.' The conductor looked in evident surprise at Plessy...") Plessy refused. The conductor stopped the train, walked back to the depot, and returned with Detective Cain. Cain and other passengers forcibly removed Plessy from the train. Cain then arrested Plessy and took him to the Orleans Parish jail. The Comité des Citoyens arrived at the jail, arranged for him to be released, and paid his $500 bond the following day by offering up a committee member's house as collateral.

=== Trial ===
On October 28, 1892, Plessy was arraigned before Judge John Howard Ferguson in the Orleans Parish criminal district court. He was represented by New Orleans lawyer James Walker, who submitted a plea challenging the jurisdiction of trial court by claiming that the Separate Car Act violated the Thirteenth and Fourteenth amendments of the United States Constitution, which provided for equal protection under the law and "impermissibly clothed train officers with the authority and duty to assign passengers on the basis of race and with the authority to refuse service." Walker's plea deliberately did not specify if Plessy was black or white. On November 18, Ferguson denied Walker's petition, stating that Louisiana had the right to regulate railroad companies while they operated within state boundaries. Four days later, Walker petitioned the Louisiana Supreme Court for a writ of prohibition to stop the trial.

In December 1892, the Louisiana Supreme Court's five members unanimously upheld Ferguson's ruling, citing two cases from Northern states as precedents: Roberts v. City of Boston, an 1849 Massachusetts Supreme Court decision, ruling that racial segregation of schools was constitutional, and an 1867 Pennsylvania Supreme Court ruling that upheld railroads' rights to seat black and white passengers in separate sections of passenger cars. The court denied Walker's subsequent request for a rehearing.

=== Supreme Court appeal ===
On January 5, 1893, Walker applied for a writ of error, which the United States Supreme Court accepted. Tourgée would represent Plessy before the Supreme Court and enlisted the aid of former Solicitor General Samuel F. Phillips as co-counsel. The case first appeared on the docket in January 1893, but Tourgée wrote to the Comité des Citoyens voicing his concerns that they would lose. In the three years since the Comité des Citoyens first organized, the court's makeup had changed under the administration of President Benjamin Harrison and had taken on a more segregationist tilt. He hoped that unsympathetic justices would change their minds with time or retire, writing in one letter: "The Court has always been the foe of liberty until forced to move on by public opinion." In the 1890s, a case could take several years to appear before the Supreme Court, and Plessy's lawyers hoped to delay until close to the 1896 United States presidential election, in the hopes the election might influence the outcome in their favor. However, the court called the case in spring 1896, and the oral arguments of Plessy v. Ferguson were held on April 13. Tourgée argued that the State of Louisiana had violated the Thirteenth Amendment that abolished slavery, and the Fourteenth Amendment that stated, "no state shall make or enforce any law which shall abridge the privileges or immunities of citizens of the United States; nor shall any state deprive any person of life, liberty, and property without due process of law." He also argued that segregation laws inherently implied that black people were inferior, and therefore stigmatized them with a second-class status that violated the Fourteenth Amendment's Equal Protection Clause, which reads: "nor shall any State ... deny to any person within its jurisdiction the equal protection of the laws."

On May 18, 1896, the Supreme Court issued a 7–1 decision against Plessy that upheld the constitutionality of Louisiana's train car segregation laws. Justice Henry Billings Brown delivered the majority opinion, first dismissing any claim that the Louisiana law violated the Thirteenth Amendment, which, in the majority's opinion, did no more than ensure that black Americans had the basic level of legal equality needed to abolish slavery. Next, the Court considered whether the law violated the Equal Protection Clause, concluding that although the Fourteenth Amendment was meant to guarantee legal equality of all races in America, it was not intended to prevent social or other types of discrimination.

The object of the [Fourteenth] Amendment was undoubtedly to enforce the absolute equality of the two races before the law, but in the nature of things, it could not have been intended to abolish distinctions based upon color, or to enforce social, as distinguished from political equality, or a commingling of the two races upon terms unsatisfactory to either.

— Plessy, 163 U.S. at 543–44.

The Court also rejected Tourgée's argument that segregation laws marked black Americans with "a badge of inferiority," and said that racial prejudice could not be overcome by legislation.

We consider the underlying fallacy of the plaintiff's argument to consist in the assumption that the enforced separation of the two races stamps the colored race with a badge of inferiority. If this be so, it is not by reason of anything found in the act, but solely because the colored race chooses to put that construction on it.

— Plessy, 163 U.S. at 551.

Brown's opinion ended with a note on the subject of Plessy's racial identity under the law. He wrote that while the question of whether Plessy was legally black or white may have bearing on the outcome of the criminal case, legal definitions of racial categories were an issue of state law not before the U.S. Supreme Court. Ultimately, Brown deferred to Louisiana law to determine whether Plessy was legally black or white.

== Later life ==
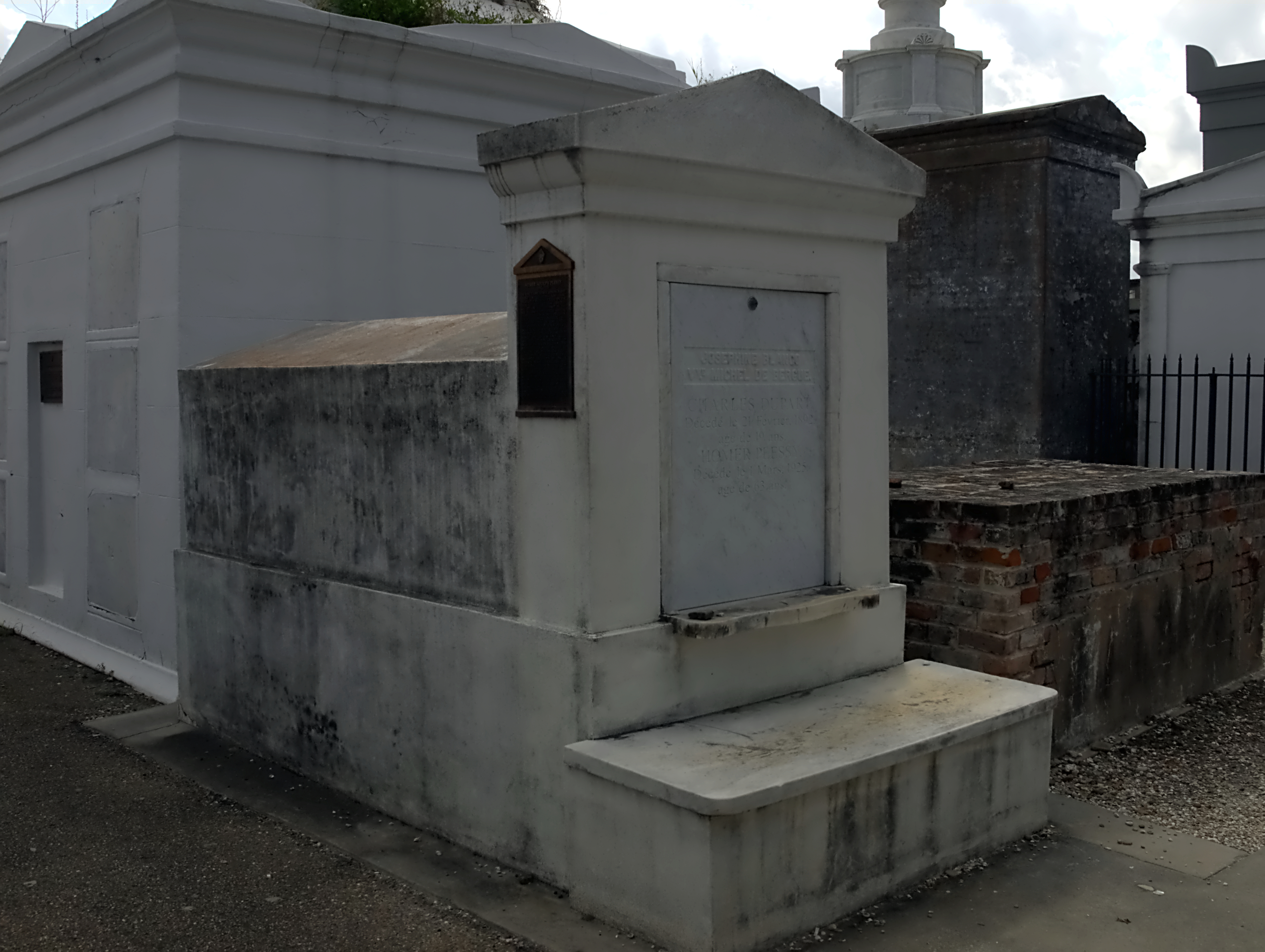
Plessy’s tomb in New Orleans

After the Supreme Court ruling, Plessy's criminal trial went ahead in Ferguson's court in Louisiana on February 11, 1897. He pleaded guilty of violating the Separate Car Act, which carried a punishment of a $25 fine or twenty days in jail. He opted to pay the fine. The Comité des Citoyens disbanded shortly after the trial's end.

The shoemaking profession declined in the late 19th and early 20th centuries due to large-scale industrial production, so Plessy later took jobs as a laborer, warehouseman, clerk, and insurance premium collector for the black-owned People's Life Insurance Company. He died on March 1, 1925, in New Orleans. His obituary read: "Homer Plessy — on Sunday, March 1, 1925, at 5:10 a.m. beloved husband of Louise Bordenave." He was interred in the Debergue-Blanco family tomb in Saint Louis Cemetery No. 1 in New Orleans, Louisiana.

== Legacy ==
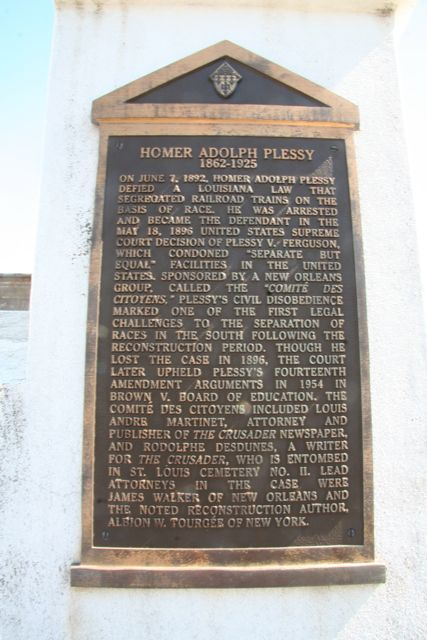
A bronze plaque on the side of Plessy's tomb in Saint Louis Cemetery No. 1, New Orleans, Louisiana, describes his historical significance.

The Supreme Court's decision in Plessy v. Ferguson created the "separate but equal" legal doctrine, allowing state-sponsored racial segregation. The Supreme Court decision in Brown v. Board of Education overturned the doctrine in 1954. Though the Plessy case did not involve education, it formed the legal basis of separate school systems for the following fifty-eight years.

In 2009, Keith Plessy and Phoebe Ferguson, relatives of Plessy and Ferguson, respectively, created the Plessy and Ferguson Foundation for Education and Reconciliation. The foundation placed a historical marker at the corner of Press and Royal Streets in New Orleans, near the site of Homer Plessy's arrest. A portion of Press Street was renamed after Plessy in 2018.

On January 5, 2022, Louisiana governor John Bel Edwards granted Plessy a posthumous pardon. The pardon was issued in accordance with the 2006 Avery C. Alexander Act, which was passed by the Louisiana Legislature to expedite the pardon process for individuals who were criminalized and convicted under Louisiana laws created for the purpose of maintaining or enforcing racial separation or discrimination of individuals.
