= Separate Car Act =

1890 segregationist law in Louisiana, US

The Separate Car Act (Act 111) was a law passed by the Louisiana State Legislature in 1890 which required "equal, but separate" train car accommodations for Black and White passengers within the state. An unsuccessful challenge to this law culminated in the United States Supreme Court decision of Plessy v. Ferguson in 1896, which upheld the constitutionality of state laws requiring racial segregation.

== History ==
The Reconstruction period and its subsequent end led to a discussion among both Blacks and Whites in the South on how to interpret "equal rights" and the new Reconstruction Amendments. J. P. Weaver, a Black preacher, had advised Blacks to accept separate accommodations if they were "first-class". "But if there is no such accommodation set apart for you, and you are crowded upon by base and reckless beings, depriving you of all that tends to your happiness ... excuse yourself for being colored, and walk in another car and cabin".

Following Reconstruction and the withdrawal of federal troops from the South, the Democratic Party came back to power. There began a process of "renegotiating the definitions of 'equal rights' in debates over post-Civil War amendments". Legislators proposed the Separate Car Bill which segregated Blacks from Whites in separate but equal conditions on train cars. Violations of the law were a misdemeanor crime punishable by a fine of at most $25 or twenty days of jail time.

The law did not go uncontested through the legislature. Republican legislator Henry Demas from St John the Baptist Parish challenged the bill as coming from the "ranks of Democratic Senators who pandered to the needs of the lower classes". To him, the bill was not a product of upper-class white citizens but those with no "social or moral standing in the community".

Despite some opposition, the Separate Car Act passed the Louisiana State Senate by 23 to 6.

== Reception ==
Paul Trevigne, a Louisianan African American, said the law was not practical. He felt that this "force class legislation" would fail in the near term because it did not take into account the lives of people living in a cosmopolitan Louisiana. "[F]uture generations would be ashamed", he said, to see such laws on the books.

Although most Blacks opposed the law, it had strong support from Whites. An editorial in The Daily Picayune of New Orleans spoke of "almost unanimous demand on the party of White people of the State for the enactment of the law" which would "increase the comfort for the traveling public". The editorial also argued that it would put Louisiana in line with other Southern states.

== Testing the law ==
In 1891, under the direction of Louis Martinet, a group of activists from New Orleans set up the Citizens Committee to Test the Constitutionality of the Separate Car Act in order to challenge the constitutionality of the law.

The first case the committee decided to test was Daniel Desdunes, son of Citizens Committee co-founder Rodolphe Desdunes, in 1892. On February 24, Desdunes bought a first-class ticket and boarded a designated White car on the Louisiana and Nashville Railroad from New Orleans to Montgomery, Alabama. The destination of another state was chosen specifically because of the belief that it violated the Commerce Clause. Desdune's case never went to trial because the Louisiana Supreme Court ruled on May 25 in the unrelated Abbott v. Hicks that the Separate Car Act did not apply to interstate passengers, rendering the test moot.

For their second attempt, the group found Homer Plessy, a mostly white "octoroon", who was still considered a "negro" under Louisiana law. On June 7, 1892 Plessy purchased a first-class ticket to take him from New Orleans to Covington on the East Louisiana Railroad, this time both destinations being within the state. Plessy boarded the "white carriage" where the conductor had been informed ahead of time that the light-skinned Plessy was legally Black. The conductor was told by Plessy that he was colored and the conductor had him arrested and charged with violation of the law. The case was brought before John Howard Ferguson—the same judge who had argued the law could not apply to interstate travel in Abbott v. Hicks. Plessy's lawyers argued on the basis of the 13th and 14th Amendments that their client's rights had been violated. Ferguson ruled that Louisiana could regulate such actions and that Plessy was guilty as charged. The Louisiana Supreme Court upheld this decision. Finally, the case ended in the Supreme Court of the United States in Plessy v. Ferguson with the judgment being upheld, leading to the judicial sanction of "separate but equal". This situation lasted for decades.
