= Lees Creek, Louisiana =

- Unincorporated community
- Location within Louisiana Location within the United States
- Coordinates: 30°44′15″N 89°52′36″W
- Country: United States
- State: Louisiana
- Parish: Washington
- Elevation: 95 ft (29 m)
- Time zone: UTC-6 (Central (CST))
  - Summer (DST): UTC-5 (CDT)
- Area code: 985
- GNIS feature ID: 543389
- FIPS code: 22-42940

Lees Creek is an unincorporated community in Washington Parish, Louisiana, United States. The community is located 2 miles (3.22 kilometres) S of Bogalusa, Louisiana.

== Name Origins ==
It is speculated that the name of the community is derived from a local church built in the area. Some researchers have suggested that both the old church and surrounding area was named after Jim Lea, one of the first settlers in the area. Washington parish courthouse records a list of local headrights granted to settlers in Washington Parish by an Act of Congress in 1820. A man named Jim Lea is listed in the document and obtained the land sometime prior to 1810.
