= Plessy v. Ferguson =

1896 U.S. Supreme Court case on racial segregation

- Supreme Court of the United States

Argued April 13, 1896 Decided May 18, 1896
- Full case name: Homer A. Plessy v. John H. Ferguson
- Citations: 163 U.S. 537 (more) 16 S. Ct. 1138; 41 L. Ed. 256; 1896 U.S. LEXIS 3390
- Decision: Opinion

Case history
- Prior: Ex parte Plessy, 11 So. 948 (La. 1892)
- Subsequent: None

Holding
- The "separate but equal" provision of private services mandated by state law is constitutional under the Equal Protection Clause.

Court membership
- Chief Justice Melville Fuller Associate Justices Stephen J. Field · John M. Harlan; Horace Gray · David J. Brewer; Henry B. Brown · George Shiras Jr. Edward D. White · Rufus W. Peckham

Case opinions
- Majority: Brown, joined by Fuller, Field, Gray, Shiras, White, Peckham
- Dissent: Harlan
- Brewer took no part in the consideration or decision of the case.

Laws applied
- U.S. Const. amends. XIII, XIV; 1890 La. Acts No. 111, p. 152, § 1
- Overruled by
- (de facto) Brown v. Board of Education (1954), and subsequent rulings

Plessy v. Ferguson, 163 U.S. 537 (1896), was a landmark United States Supreme Court decision ruling that racial segregation laws did not violate the U.S. Constitution as long as the facilities for each race were equal in quality, a doctrine that came to be known as "separate but equal". The decision legitimized the many "Jim Crow laws" re-establishing racial segregation that had been passed in the American South after the end of the Reconstruction era in 1877.

The underlying case began in 1892 when Homer Plessy, a mixed-race man, deliberately boarded a whites-only train car in New Orleans. By boarding the whites-only car, Plessy violated Louisiana's Separate Car Act of 1890, which required "equal, but separate" railroad accommodations for white and black passengers. Plessy was charged under the Act, and at his trial his lawyers argued that judge John Howard Ferguson should dismiss the charges on the grounds that the Act was unconstitutional. Ferguson denied the request, and the Louisiana Supreme Court upheld Ferguson's ruling on appeal. Plessy then appealed to the U.S. Supreme Court.

In May 1896, the Supreme Court issued a 7–1 decision against Plessy, ruling that the Louisiana law did not violate the Fourteenth Amendment to the U.S. Constitution. It held that although the Fourteenth Amendment established the legal equality of whites and blacks, it did not and could not require the elimination of all "distinctions based upon color". The Court rejected Plessy's lawyers' arguments that the Louisiana law inherently implied that black people were inferior. It gave great deference to American state legislatures' inherent power to make laws regulating health, safety, and morals—the "police power"—and to determine the reasonableness of the laws they passed. Justice John Marshall Harlan was the lone dissenter from the Court's decision, writing that the U.S. Constitution "is color-blind, and neither knows nor tolerates classes among citizens", and so the laws distinguishing races should have been found unconstitutional.

Plessy is widely regarded as one of the worst decisions in U.S. Supreme Court history. Despite its infamy, the decision has never been overruled explicitly; however, beginning in 1954 with Brown v. Board of Education, a series of the Court's later decisions have severely weakened Plessy to the point that it is usually considered de facto overruled.

== Background ==
=== Legal background and incident ===
In 1890, the Louisiana State Legislature passed a law called the Separate Car Act, which required separate accommodations for blacks and whites on Louisiana railroads. The law required passenger train officers to "assign each passenger to the coach or compartment used for the race to which such passenger belongs". The separation was purportedly done "to promote the comfort of passengers". The law also made it a misdemeanor for any passenger to "insist on going into a coach or compartment to which by race he does not belong," punishable by either a US$25 (equivalent to $895.83 in 2025) fine or up to 20 days in prison. A group of prominent black, creole of color, and white creole New Orleans residents formed a civil rights group called the Comité des Citoyens (Committee of Citizens). The group was dedicated to repealing the Separate Car Act and fighting its implementation. The Comité eventually persuaded Homer Plessy, a man of mixed race who was an "octoroon" (person of seven-eighths white and one-eighth black ancestry), to participate in an orchestrated test case to challenge the Act. Plessy had been born a free man and was fair-skinned. However, under Louisiana law, he was classified as black, and thus required to sit in the "colored" car.

On June 7, 1892, Plessy bought a first-class ticket at the Press Street Depot and boarded a "Whites Only" car of the East Louisiana Railroad in New Orleans, Louisiana, bound for Covington, Louisiana. The railroad company, which had opposed the law on the grounds that it would require the purchase of more railcars, had been previously informed of Plessy's racial lineage, and the intent to challenge the law. Additionally, the Comité des Citoyens hired a private detective with arrest powers to detain Plessy, to ensure that he would be charged for violating the Separate Car Act, as opposed to vagrancy or some other offense. After Plessy took a seat in the whites-only railway car, he was asked to vacate it, and sit instead in the blacks-only car. Plessy refused and was arrested immediately by the detective. As planned, the train was stopped, and Plessy was taken off the train at Press and Royal streets. Plessy was remanded for trial in Orleans Parish.

=== Trial ===
Plessy petitioned the state district criminal court to throw out the case, State v. Homer Adolph Plessy, on the grounds that the state law requiring East Louisiana Railroad to segregate trains had denied him his rights under the Thirteenth and Fourteenth amendments of the United States Constitution, which provided for equal treatment under the law. However, the judge presiding over his case, John Howard Ferguson, ruled that Louisiana had the right to regulate railroad companies while they operated within state boundaries. Four days later, Plessy petitioned the Louisiana Supreme Court for a writ of prohibition to stop his criminal trial.

=== State appeal ===
The Louisiana Supreme Court issued a temporary writ of prohibition while it reviewed Plessy's case. In December 1892, the court upheld Judge Ferguson's ruling, and denied Plessy's attorneys' subsequent request for a rehearing. In speaking for the court's decision that Ferguson's judgment did not violate the 14th Amendment, Louisiana Supreme Court Justice Charles Erasmus Fenner cited a number of precedents, including two key cases from Northern states. The Massachusetts Supreme Court had ruled in 1849—before the 14th amendment—that segregated schools were constitutional. In answering the charge that segregation perpetuated race prejudice, the Massachusetts court famously stated: "This prejudice, if it exists, is not created by law, and probably cannot be changed by law." The law itself was repealed five years later, but the precedent stood. In a Pennsylvania law mandating separate railcars for different races the Pennsylvania Supreme Court stated: "To assert separateness is not to declare inferiority ... It is simply to say that following the order of Divine Providence, human authority ought not to compel these widely separated races to intermix."

=== Supreme Court appeal ===
Undaunted, the Committee appealed to the United States Supreme Court. Two legal briefs were submitted on Plessy's behalf. One was signed by Albion W. Tourgée and James C. Walker and the other by Samuel F. Phillips and his legal partner F. D. McKenney. Oral arguments were held before the Supreme Court on April 13, 1896. Tourgée and Phillips appeared in the courtroom to speak on behalf of Plessy. Tourgée built his case upon violation of Plessy's rights under the 13th Amendment, prohibiting slavery, and the 14th Amendment, which states "No State shall make or enforce any law which shall abridge the privileges or immunities of citizens of the United States; nor shall any State deprive any person of life, liberty, or property, without due process of law; nor deny to any person within its jurisdiction the equal protection of the laws." Tourgée argued that the reputation of being a black man was "property", which, by the law, implied the inferiority of African Americans as compared to whites. The state legal brief was prepared by Attorney General Milton Joseph Cunningham of Natchitoches and New Orleans. Cunningham was a staunch supporter of white supremacy, who according to a laudatory 1916 obituary "worked so effectively [during Reconstruction] in restoring white supremacy in politics that he finally was arrested, with fifty-one other men of that community, and tried by federal officials."

== Decision ==
On May 18, 1896, the Supreme Court issued a 7–1 (Note: Due to the sudden death of his daughter, justice David J. Brewer left Washington shortly before oral arguments and did not participate in the decision.) decision against Plessy that upheld the constitutionality of Louisiana's train car segregation laws.

=== Opinion of the Court ===
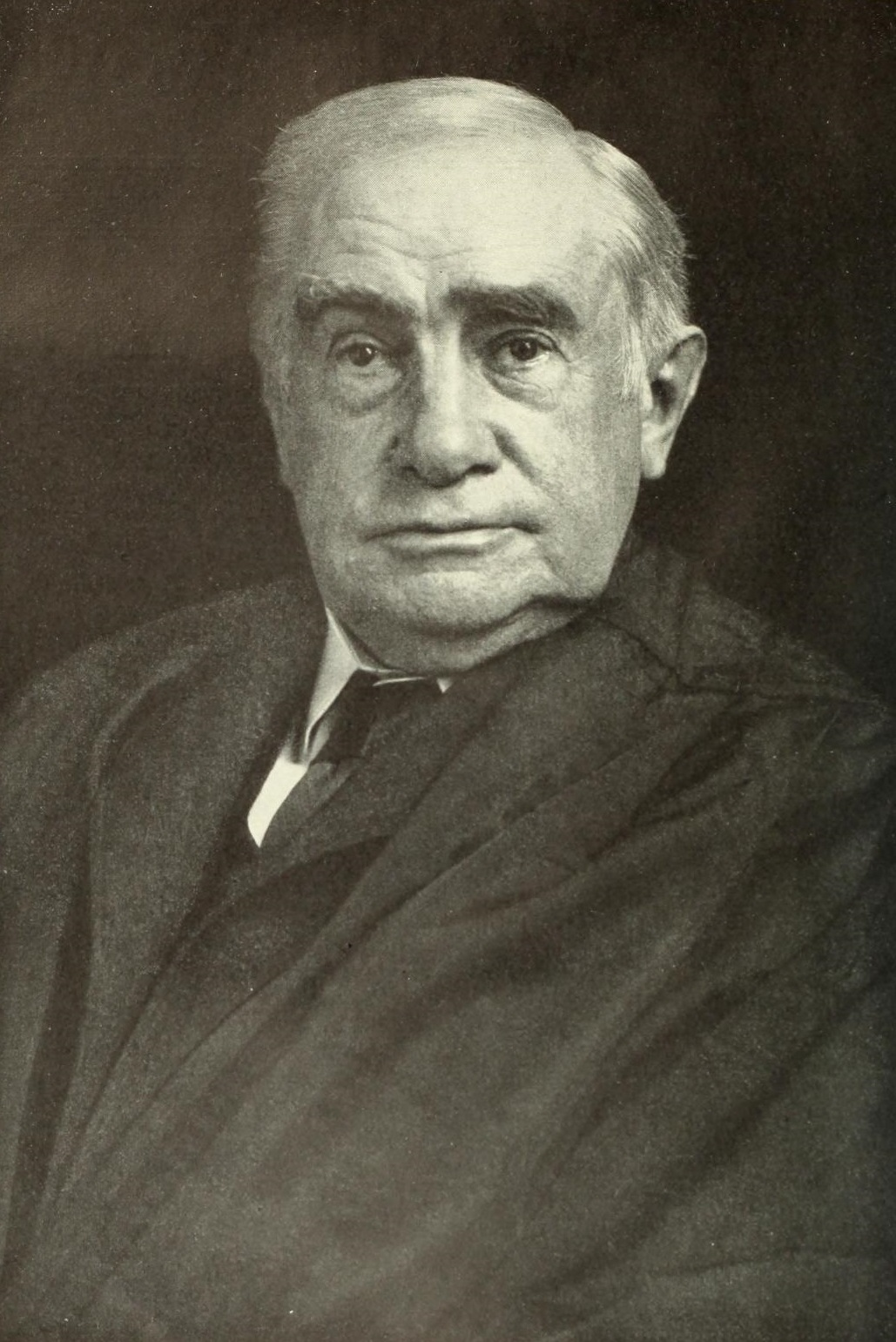
Justice Henry Billings Brown, author of the majority opinion in Plessy

Seven justices formed the Court's majority and joined an opinion written by justice Henry Billings Brown. The Court first dismissed any claim that the Louisiana law violated the Thirteenth Amendment, which, in the majority's opinion, did no more than ensure that black Americans had the basic level of legal equality needed to abolish slavery. Next, the Court considered whether the law violated the Fourteenth Amendment's Equal Protection Clause, which reads: "nor shall any State ... deny to any person within its jurisdiction the equal protection of the laws." The Court said that although the Fourteenth Amendment was meant to guarantee the legal equality of all races in the United States, it was not intended to prevent social or other types of discrimination.

The object of the [Fourteenth] Amendment was undoubtedly to enforce the absolute equality of the two races before the law, but in the nature of things, it could not have been intended to abolish distinctions based upon color, or to enforce social, as distinguished from political equality, or a commingling of the two races upon terms unsatisfactory to either.

— Plessy, 163 U.S. at 543–44.

The Court reasoned that laws requiring racial separation were within Louisiana's police power: the core sovereign authority of U.S. states to pass laws on matters of "health, safety, and morals". It held that as long as a law that classified and separated people by their race was a reasonable and good faith exercise of a state's police power and was not designed to oppress a particular class, the law did not violate the Equal Protection Clause. According to the Court, the question in any case that involved a racial segregation law was whether the law was reasonable, and the Court gave State legislatures broad discretion to determine the reasonableness of the laws they passed.

Plessy's lawyers had argued that segregation laws inherently implied that black people were inferior and stigmatized them with a second-class status that violated the Equal Protection Clause; however, the Court rejected this argument.

We consider the underlying fallacy of the plaintiff's argument to consist in the assumption that the enforced separation of the two races stamps the colored race with a badge of inferiority. If this be so, it is not by reason of anything found in the act, but solely because the colored race chooses to put that construction on it.

— Plessy, 163 U.S. at 551.

The Court rejected the notion that the law marked black Americans with "a badge of inferiority", and said that racial prejudice could not be overcome by legislation.

=== Harlan's dissent ===
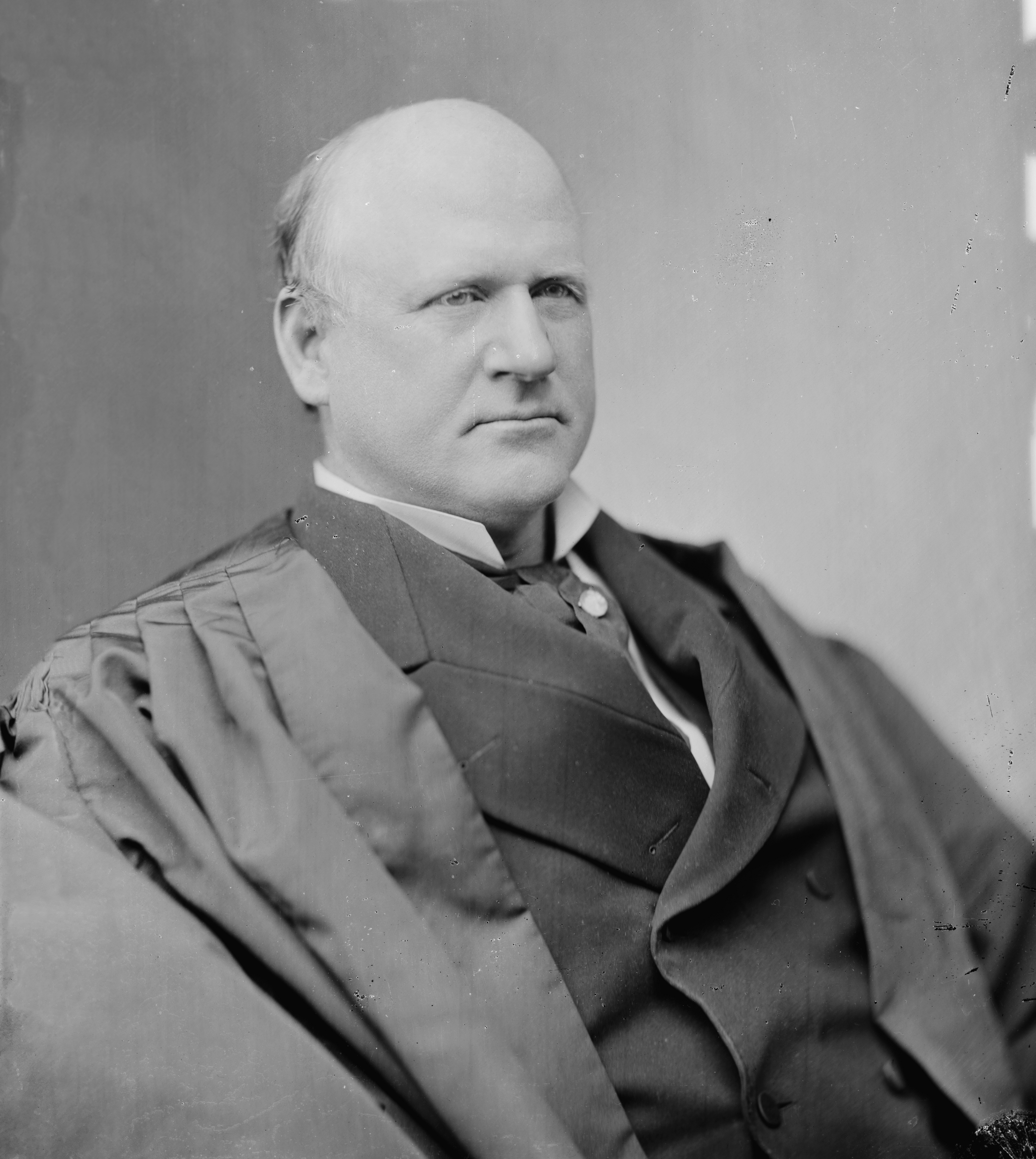
Justice John Marshall Harlan became known as the "Great Dissenter" for his fiery dissent in Plessy and other early civil rights cases.

Justice John Marshall Harlan was the lone dissenter from the Court's decision. Harlan strongly disagreed with the Court's conclusion that the Louisiana railcar law did not imply that black people were inferior, and he accused the majority of being willfully ignorant on the issue.

Every one knows that the statute in question had its origin in the purpose, not so much to exclude white people from railroad cars occupied by blacks, as to exclude colored people from coaches occupied by or assigned to white persons. ... The thing to accomplish was, under the guise of giving equal accommodation for whites and blacks, to compel the latter to keep to themselves while traveling in railroad passenger coaches. No one would be so wanting in candor as to assert the contrary.

— Plessy, 163 U.S. at 557 (Harlan, J., dissenting).

To support his argument, Harlan pointed out that the Louisiana law had an exception for "nurses attending children of the other race". This exception allowed black women who were nannies to white children to ride in the white-only train cars. Harlan said this showed that the Louisiana law allowed black people to be in white-only cars only if it was obvious that they were "social subordinates" or "domestics". In a now-famous passage, Harlan forcefully argued that even though many white Americans of the late 19th century considered themselves superior to those of other races, the U.S. Constitution was "color-blind" regarding the law and civil rights.

The white race deems itself to be the dominant race in this country. And so it is in prestige, in achievements, in education, in wealth and in power. ... But in view of the constitution, in the eye of the law, there is in this country no superior, dominant, ruling class of citizens. There is no caste here. Our constitution is color-blind, and neither knows nor tolerates classes among citizens. In respect of civil rights, all citizens are equal before the law. The humblest is the peer of the most powerful. The law regards man as man, and takes no account of his surroundings or of his color when his civil rights as guaranteed by the supreme law of the land are involved.

— Plessy, 163 U.S. at 559 (Harlan, J., dissenting).

Harlan predicted the Court's decision would eventually become as infamous as its 1857 decision Dred Scott v. Sandford, in which the Court had ruled that black Americans could not be citizens under the U.S. Constitution and that its legal protections and privileges could never apply to them.

== Aftermath ==
After the Supreme Court ruling, Plessy's criminal trial went ahead in Ferguson's court in Louisiana on February 11, 1897. Plessy changed his plea to "guilty" of violating the Separate Car Act, which carried a $25 fine or 20 days in jail. He opted to pay the fine. The Comité des Citoyens disbanded shortly after the trial's end.

== Significance ==
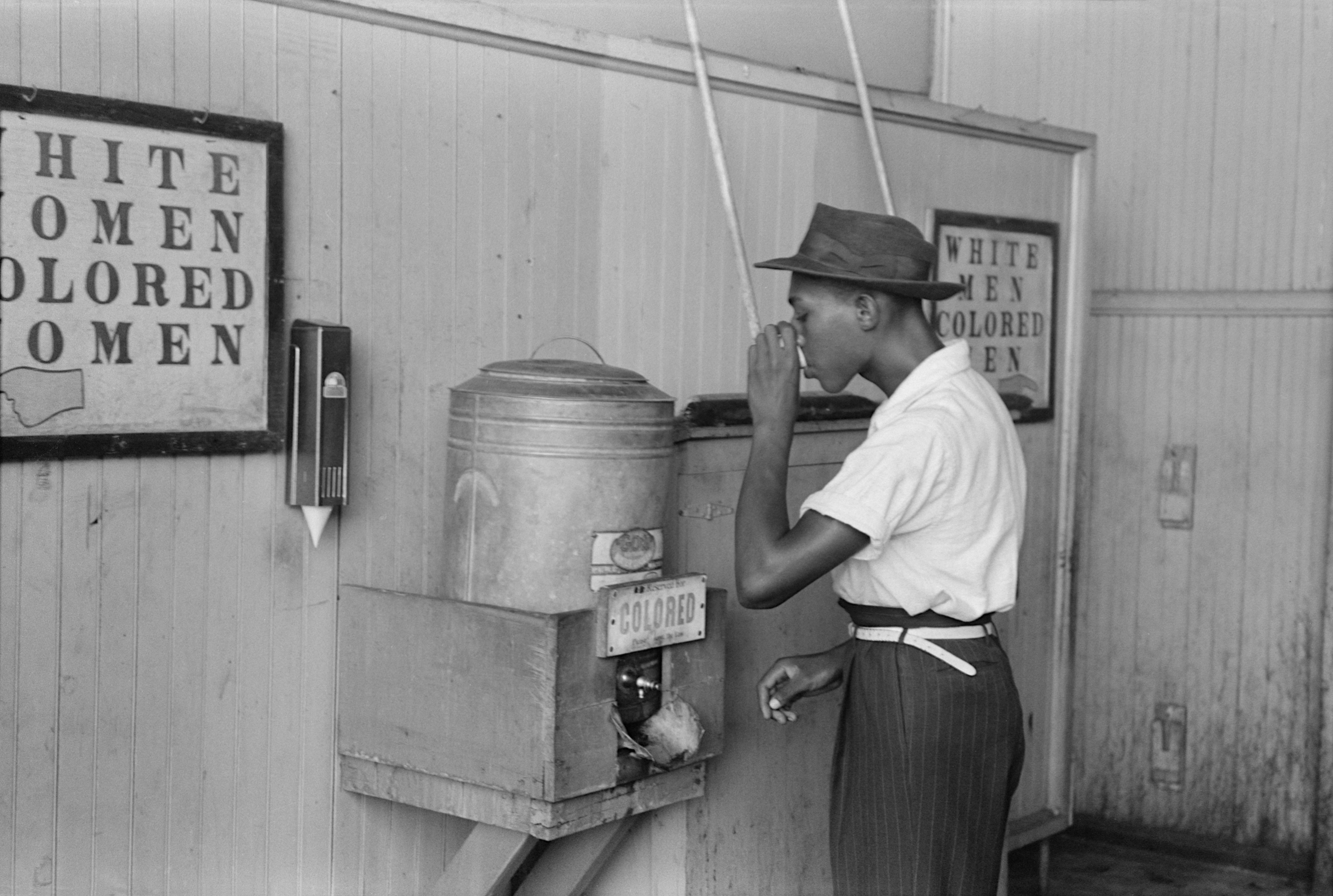
An Oklahoma City streetcar terminal's "colored" drinking fountain, 1939

Plessy legitimized state laws establishing "racial" segregation in the South and provided an impetus for further segregation laws. It also legitimized laws in the North requiring "racial" segregation, such as in the Boston school segregation case noted by Justice Brown in his majority opinion. Legislative achievements won during the Reconstruction Era were erased through means of the "separate but equal" doctrine. The doctrine had been strengthened also by an 1875 Supreme Court decision that limited the federal government's ability to intervene in state affairs, guaranteeing to Congress only the power "to restrain states from acts of racial discrimination and segregation". The ruling basically granted states legislative immunity when dealing with questions of "race", guaranteeing the states' right to implement racially separate institutions, requiring them only to be equal.

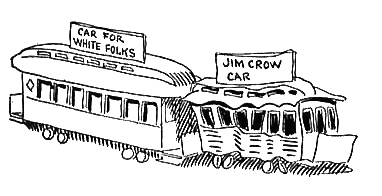
1904 caricature of "White" and "Jim Crow" rail cars by John T. McCutcheon

Despite the pretense of "separate but equal", non-whites essentially always received inferior facilities and treatment, if they received them at all. The prospect of greater state influence in matters of race worried numerous advocates of civil equality, including Supreme Court Justice John Harlan, who wrote in his Plessy dissent, "we shall enter upon an era of constitutional law, when the rights of freedom and American citizenship cannot receive from the nation that efficient protection which heretofore was unhesitatingly accorded to slavery and the rights of the master."

Harlan's concerns about the encroachment on the 14th Amendment would prove well-founded; states proceeded to institute segregation-based laws that became known as the Jim Crow system. In addition, from 1890 to 1908, Southern states passed new or amended constitutions including provisions that effectively disenfranchised blacks and thousands of poor whites. Some commentators, such as Gabriel J. Chin and Eric Maltz, have viewed Harlan's Plessy dissent in a more critical light, and suggested it be viewed in context with his other decisions. Maltz has argued that "modern commentators have often overstated Harlan's distaste for race-based classifications", pointing to other aspects of decisions in which Harlan was involved. Both point to a passage of Harlan's Plessy dissent as particularly troubling:

There is a race so different from our own that we do not permit those belonging to it to become citizens of the United States. Persons belonging to it are, with few exceptions, absolutely excluded from our country. I allude to the Chinese race. But, by the statute in question, a Chinaman can ride in the same passenger coach with white citizens of the United States, while citizens of the black race in Louisiana, many of whom, perhaps, risked their lives for the preservation of the Union ... and who have all the legal rights that belong to white citizens, are yet declared to be criminals, liable to imprisonment, if they ride in a public coach occupied by citizens of the white race.

New Orleans historian Keith Weldon Medley, author of We As Freemen: Plessy v. Ferguson, The Fight Against Legal Segregation, said the words in Justice Harlan's "Great Dissent" were taken from papers filed with the court by "The Citizen's Committee".

The effect of the Plessy ruling was immediate; there were already significant differences in funding for the segregated school system, which continued into the 20th century; states consistently underfunded black schools, providing them with substandard buildings, textbooks, and supplies. States which had successfully integrated elements of their society abruptly adopted oppressive legislation that erased reconstruction era efforts. The principles of Plessy v. Ferguson were affirmed in Lum v. Rice (1927), which upheld the right of a Mississippi public school for white children to exclude a Chinese American girl. Despite the laws enforcing compulsory education, and the lack of public schools for Chinese children in Lum's area, the Supreme Court ruled that she had the choice to attend a private school. Jim Crow laws and practices spread northward in response to a second wave of African-American migration from the South to northern and midwestern cities. Some established de jure segregated educational facilities, separate public institutions such as hotels and restaurants, separate beaches among other public facilities, and restrictions on interracial marriage, but in other cases segregation in the North was related to unstated practices and operated on a de facto basis, although not by law, among numerous other facets of daily life.

The separate facilities and institutions accorded to the African-American community were consistently inferior to those provided to the White community. This contradicted the vague declaration of "separate but equal" issued after the Plessy decision. From 1890 to 1908, state legislatures in the South disenfranchised most blacks and many poor whites through rejecting them for voter registration and voting: making voter registration more difficult by providing more detailed records, such as proof of land ownership or literacy tests administered by white staff at poll stations. African-American community leaders, who had achieved brief political success during the Reconstruction era and even into the 1880s, lost gains made when their voters were excluded from the political system. Historian Rogers Smith noted on the subject that "lawmakers frequently admitted, indeed boasted, that such measures as complex registration rules, literacy and property tests, poll taxes, white primaries, and grandfather clauses were designed to produce an electorate confined to a white race that declared itself supreme", notably rejecting the 14th and 15th Amendments to the American Constitution.

In Brown v. Board of Education (1954), the US Supreme Court ruled that segregation in public education was unconstitutional. While Plessy v. Ferguson was never explicitly overruled by the Supreme Court, it is effectively dead as a precedent; the Interstate Commerce Commission ruled that segregation on interstate transport violated the Interstate Commerce Act in the 1955 case Keys v. Carolina Coach Co. The Civil Rights Act of 1964 prohibited segregation in public places and the Voting Rights Act of 1965 provided for federal oversight and enforcement of voter registration and voting.

=== Plessy and Ferguson Foundation ===
In 2009, Keith Plessy and Phoebe Ferguson, descendants of participants on both sides of the 1896 Supreme Court case, announced the establishment of the Plessy and Ferguson Foundation for Education and Reconciliation. The foundation would work to create new ways to teach the history of civil rights through film, art, and public programs designed to create understanding of this historic case and its effect on the American conscience. Also in 2009, a marker was placed at the corner of Press and Royal streets in New Orleans, where Plessy had been removed from his train.

=== Pardon ===
In 2021, the Louisiana Board of Pardons unanimously approved a posthumous pardon of Plessy, sending it to Governor John Bel Edwards for final approval. Edwards granted the pardon on January 5, 2022.

== See also ==
- Anticanon
- List of United States court cases involving the Fourteenth Amendment
- Loving v. Virginia
- United States constitutional law
