= John Howard Ferguson =

American judge (1838–1915)

John Howard Ferguson (June 10, 1838 – November 12, 1915) was an American lawyer and judge from Louisiana, most famous as the defendant in the Plessy v. Ferguson case.

== Biography ==
Ferguson was born the third and last child to Baptist parents (John H. Ferguson & Sarah Davis Luce) on June 10, 1838, in Chilmark, Massachusetts. The son, grandson, great-grandson, and great-great-grandson of Martha's Vineyard (Chimark & Tisbury) Master Mariners, John Howard Ferguson chose a different vocational path and taught school in his early years, finally setting about to study law.

Young Ferguson's family was all but wiped out between 1849 and 1861, and after the Civil War ended, and he had completed his legal studies in Boston under the tutelage of Benjamin F. Hallett, Ferguson moved to New Orleans in 1865. There he met and married in July 1866, Virginia Butler Earhart, daughter of Thomas Jefferson Earhart, a staunch and outspoken abolitionist from Pennsylvania. The Fergusons raised three sons (Walter Judson, Milo & Donald Ferguson) in Burtheville (Uptown New Orleans) at 1500 Henry Clay Avenue. The house still stands today and is designated a historical landmark of the 1989 Orleans Parish Landmarks Commission.

Ferguson served in the Louisiana Legislature and practiced law in New Orleans until he was tapped in 1892 for a judgeship at the criminal district court, Section A, for the Parish of New Orleans, Louisiana. There he presided over the case Homer Adolph Plessy v. The State of Louisiana. The case was brought by Homer Plessy and eventually led to the infamous Plessy v. Ferguson decision by the United States Supreme Court upholding the constitutionality of racial segregation.

Judge Ferguson had previously ruled that the Louisiana Railway Car Act of 1890 (The Separate Car Act), a law declaring that Louisiana rail companies had to provide separate but equal accommodations for white and non-white passengers, was "unconstitutional on trains that travelled through several states" on Equal Protection grounds under the 14th Amendment to the United States Constitution grounds. In Plessy's case, however, he concluded that the state could choose to regulate railroad companies that operated solely within the state of Louisiana and declared the Separate Car Act to be constitutional in intrastate cases.

Plessy then appealed the case to the Louisiana Supreme Court, which affirmed the decision that the Louisiana law was constitutional. Plessy petitioned for a writ of error from the Supreme Court of the United States where Judge John Howard Ferguson was named in the case brought before the United States Supreme Court because he had been named in the petition to the Louisiana Supreme Court.

Judge John Howard Ferguson died in New Orleans at the age of 77 on November 12, 1915. That same year, both his son Walter Judson Ferguson in the month of June, and his wife, Virginia Butler Earhart Ferguson, in the month of September, pre-deceased him. He is buried with his wife and other Earhart family members in Lafayette Cemetery # 1 in the old part of New Orleans. (Authored & Extensively Researched by John H. Ferguson IV, Great, Great Grandson).

== Plessy and Ferguson Foundation ==
In 2009, descendants of Ferguson and Plessy formed the Plessy & Ferguson Foundation of New Orleans to honor the successes of the civil rights movement. On February 12, 2009, they partnered with the Crescent City Peace Alliance and the New Orleans Center for Creative Arts in placing a historical marker at the corner of Press Street and Royal Street, the site of Homer Plessy's arrest in New Orleans in 1892.

Appearances by Louisiana Supreme Court Justice Bernette Joshua Johnson, Tulane University professor Lawrence N. Powell, professor Raphael Cassimere, and historian and author Keith W. Medley took place as scheduled.

Keith Plessy and Phoebe Ferguson, two of the descendants of both participants of the Supreme Court case, announced the creation of the Plessy and Ferguson Foundation for Education, Preservation and Outreach. The foundation strives to teach the history of civil rights through film, art, and public programs designed to create understanding of this historic case and its legacy on the American conscience. Foundation Board Members include: Raynard Sanders, Ph.D., John Howard Ferguson IV, Alexander Pierre Tureaud Jr., Katharine Ferguson Roberts, Jackson Knowles, Phoebe Chase Ferguson, Keith M. Plessy, Brenda Billips Square, Keith Weldon Medley, Ron Bechet, Stephen Plessy, Judy Bajoie, and Neferteri Plessy.

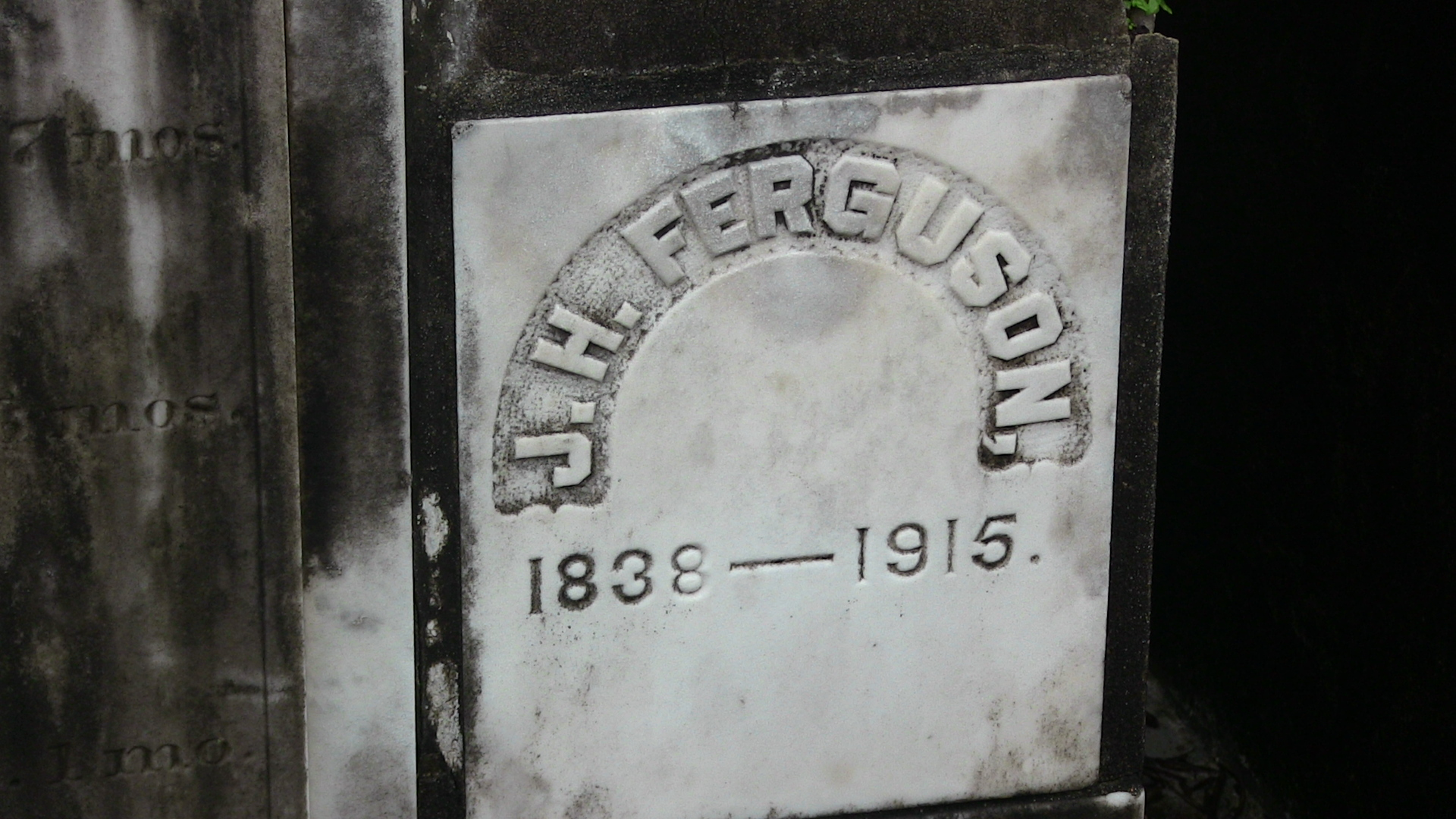

The Plessy & Ferguson Foundation states that the 1892 arrest of Homer Plessy was part of an organized effort by the Citizens Committee to challenge Louisiana's Separate Car Act. While many consider the civil rights movement to have begun in the 1950s, communities were organizing for equal rights much earlier in the U.S. Although the United States Supreme Court ruled against Plessy in 1896, their arguments produced Justice John Marshall Harlan's "Great Dissent". The committee's use of civil disobedience and the court system foreshadowed the Civil Rights struggles of the 20th century.

== Books ==
- Medley, Keith Weldon (2003). We As Freemen: Plessy v. Ferguson. Gretna, LA: Pelican. ISBN 1-58980-120-2. Review
