= Mary Dora Coghill =

- Born: c. 1869; Alabama
- Died: April 9, 1957, at age 88; Los Angeles, California
- Occupations: principal, vice principal, teacher

Mary Dora Coghill (c. 1869 - April 9, 1957) was an American teacher, vice principal, principal, and civic leader in early twentieth-century New Orleans. She was a member of numerous civic and relief organizations and a leader in education reform. She was an African-American.

== Education and career ==
Mary Coghill attended Straight University and became a teacher. In 1902, she was appointed vice principal of Thomy Lafon school, where she served in that role for five years. In 1908, the New Orleans School Board, in an effort to further segregate the educational system, replaced the all-white staff of the Bayou Road school (which taught black children) with an all-black staff. Coghill was appointed as the principal, with Fannie C. Williams and Agnes Lewis Bauduit serving as some of the school’s teachers. A.P. Tureaud, future NAACP lawyer, was a student at the Bayou Road school at the tine, and recalled how it was to suddenly have a staff of black women as his teachers.

Principal Coghill guided the Bayou Road school through many issues. First, the building was in poor shape and suffered multiple destructive events. In the early 1920s, the school board finally decided to build a brand new building a few blocks away. In 1923, the school’s name was changed to Joseph A. Craig and in 1927 the new building opened, despite protests from white people that a negro school was being built in a predominantly white neighborhood. Coghill continued to serve as principal of Craig until her retirement in 1941. Over the years, her students had opportunities to demonstrate both their talents and their citizenship to the city.

== Civic engagement ==
Following earlier work to address hunger among orphaned children, in 1909, she became an officer of the Colored Juvenile Court Auxiliary. In 1919, she was chairman of the New Orleans Colored Teachers’ Association. Later, she was a leader in the Negro School Principals Association. She was active with the Hume Community Center, Colored Vocational Guidance Association, NAACP, YWCA, and the Red Cross. During World War II after her retirement from education, she served as co-chair of the Orleans Parish Negro War Savings Committee. She was also a trustee of the Central Congregational Church.

She was a founding member of the Colored Educational Alliance, which formed in 1913 to improve conditions in negro schools, expand educational offerings for black adults, and to open a high school for black children. The group worked to raise awareness, raise funds, and ultimately, to convince the Orleans Parish School Board to open McDonogh No. 35 High School in 1917. She continued to work with the Colored Educational Alliance for many years after.

== Personal life ==
Likely born in Alabama, Mary’s family apparently moved to New Orleans when she was young. Depending on the source, she was born sometime between 1869 and 1874. Her mother was most likely from Alabama, while her father was either from Kentucky or England, depending on the census record. Little is known about her early years, but she does appear to have been a diligent student, because she won a spelling bee in 1887 at the Colored State Fair at Spanish Fort. The prize was ten dollars.

She appears to have neither married nor had children, instead sharing her home with nieces and nephews later in her life. After retiring, she continued to live in New Orleans for several years before moving to California, where she lived until her death in Los Angeles in April 1957. The Times-Picayune noted in their death notice that she was 88 years old.

== Legacy ==
In 1960, a primary school was built in the Black suburb of Pontchartrain Park and named for her. It is currently known as the Mary D. Coghill Elementary School.
