= Kimberly Johnson =

Kimberly Johnson may refer to:

- Kimberly Johnson (poet), American poet and Renaissance scholar
- Kimberly Johnson (politician), member of the South Carolina House of Representatives
- Kimberly S. Johnson, American clinical investigator

== See also ==
- Kim Johnson (disambiguation)
