= Dillard University =

Private college in New Orleans, Louisiana, U.S.

- Former names: Straight University (1868–1915); Straight College (1915–1930); Union Normal School (1868–1915); New Orleans University (1915–1930)
- Motto: Ex Fide, Fortis
- Motto in English: "Strong Through Faith" (lit. "Out of faith, strong")
- Type: Private historically black university
- Religious affiliation: United Church of Christ, United Methodist Church
- Academic affiliations: UNCF; Space-grant
- Endowment: $100 million
- President: Monique Guillory
- Provost: Dorian Williams
- Students: 1,301
- Location: New Orleans, Louisiana, U.S. 29°59′42″N 90°03′55″W
- Campus: Urban
- Colors: Royal blue & white
- Nickname: Bleu Devils and Lady Bleu Devils
- Sporting affiliations: NAIA – HBCUAC
- Mascot: Bleu Devil
- Website: www.dillard.edu

Dillard University is a private, historically black university in New Orleans, Louisiana. It was founded in 1930, and incorporated earlier institutions founded as early as 1869 following the American Civil War. It is affiliated with the United Church of Christ and the United Methodist Church.

== History ==
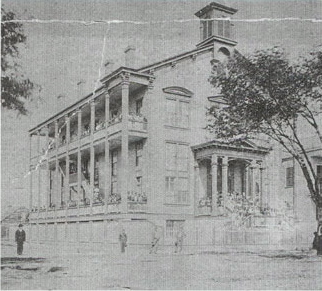
Photo of an early building on the Straight University campus

Dillard University dates back to 1869 with its founding predecessor institutions: Straight University (later renamed Straight College) and Union Normal School (which developed into New Orleans University).

=== Straight University ===
Responding to the post-Civil War need to educate newly freed African Americans in New Orleans, Louisiana, and the surrounding region, the American Missionary Association of the Congregational Church founded Straight University on June 12, 1868.

Straight University also offered professional training, including a law department from 1874 to 1886. Its graduates participated in local and national Reconstruction and post-Reconstruction era civil rights struggles.

Straight University was renamed Straight College in 1915, to better reflect the limitations of its curriculum.

=== Union Normal School/New Orleans University ===
The Union Normal School was established on July 8, 1868, by the Freedman's Aid Society of the Methodist Episcopal Church to train teachers. The Society also recruited teachers in the North to work in the South educating freedmen and their children.

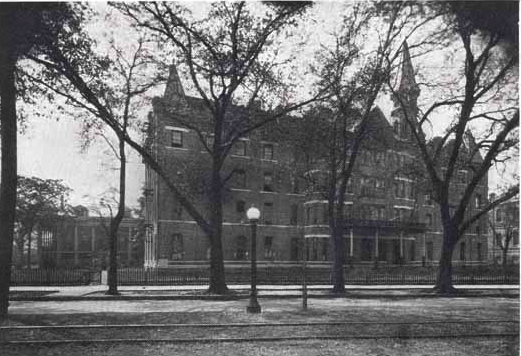
New Orleans College, c. 1920

In addition to Straight University, the AMA helped found several other historically black colleges and universities, such as Clark Atlanta University, Fisk University, Hampton University, Howard University (with Freedmen's Bureau), Huston-Tillotson University, LeMoyne-Owen College, Talladega College, and Tougaloo College. Straight University and Union Normal School later became known and developed as Straight College and New Orleans University, respectively. Both schools offered education for elementary-level teachers, but quickly enlarged their curricula to include secondary, collegiate, and professional-level instruction.

New Orleans University operated a secondary school, Gilbert Academy. By the 1890s, the university offered professional medical training. It included a school of pharmacy, the Flint Medical College, (named after John Flint of Fall River, Massachusetts who donated the money), and the Sarah Goodridge Hospital and Nurse Training School. After the medical college was closed in 1911, the Flint Goodridge Hospital emerged and continued nurse training.

=== "A Great Negro University in New Orleans": 1930–1935 ===
University presidents
| Will W. Alexander | 1935–1936 |
| William Stuart Nelson | 1936–1940 |
| Albert Walter Dent | 1941–1969 |
| Broadus Nathaniel Butler | 1969–1973 |
| Myron Wicke | 1973–1974 |
| Samuel DuBois Cook | 1974–1997 |
| Michael Lucius Lomax | 1997–2004 |
| Bettye Parker Smith | 2004–2005 |
| Marvalene Hughes | 2005–2011 |
| James E. Lyons, Sr. | 2011–2012 |
| Walter M. Kimbrough | 2012–2022 |
| Rochelle L. Ford | 2022–2024 |

Local Black and White leaders felt there was a need to develop a larger, more notable African-American institution of higher learning in New Orleans and the greater South. Due to economic hardships and rounds of negotiations between the two institutions, Straight College and New Orleans University chartered Dillard University on June 6, 1930.

Named after James H. Dillard, the new university was created to "... offer a traditional liberal arts curriculum—rather than nonprofessional, vocational training" and emphasize a close engagement with the Black community through "various education extension programs, societies, and clubs." Its development was tempered by the Jim Crow era. Many local whites took issue with the possibility of a black president presiding over white faculty members. The increased numbers of African-American bus riders in the Gentilly area, as students started attending classes, disturbed some white residents. Edgar B. Stern Sr, an influential and diplomatic member of Dillard's board of trustees and son-in-law of Julius Rosenwald, founder of the Rosenwald Fund, suggested Will W. Alexander as a compromise candidate for president. A white Southern preacher, he became Dillard's first acting president (1935–1936). His experience as the director of the Commission on Interracial Cooperation proved valuable. Dillard University opened its doors in the fall of 1935, and was able to attract prominent scholars such as Horace Mann Bond, psychology and education; Frederick Douglass Hall, music; Lawrence D. Reddick, history; and St. Clair Drake, sociology and anthropology.

=== 21st century ===
In 2003, musician Ray Charles added a provision in his will to endow a $1 million (~$1.67 million in 2025) professorship of African-American culinary history at Dillard. It is the first such position in the country, and is called the Ray Charles Program.

In August 2005, the campus, not far from the lower levee breach of the London Avenue Canal, suffered extensive flood damage in the aftermath of Hurricane Katrina. Nelson Hall was destroyed by a fire. A bus fire destroyed belongings of 37 students who were in the process of being evacuated.

In spring 2006, the students of Dillard University took their classes at The New Orleans World Trade Center and The New Orleans Hilton Riverside Hotel. As is tradition, Dillard held graduation on the Rosa Freeman Keller Avenue of the Oaks in July 2006. Students returned to campus in September 2006.

In November 2016, Raycom Media rented a space at Dillard University to host a debate with senatorial candidates, including David Duke. The event was met with opposition; six protesters were arrested. When the rental agreement was made, months in advance, the university was unaware of the candidates.

In 2019, Dillard signed a partnership with a for-profit college, Ross University School of Medicine, to increase the number of African American physicians in the US.

In 2020, MacKenzie Scott donated $5 million (~$6.12 million in 2025) to Dillard University. In 2025, Scott donated an additional $19 million which is the largest single gift in Dillard's history.

== Academics ==
Academic rankings

Liberal arts
- U.S. News & World Report: RNP
- Washington Monthly: 83

Dillard University offers Bachelor of Arts, Bachelor of Science, and Bachelor of Science in Nursing degrees in over 35 majors. These majors are organized within four academic colleges, and further subdivided by departments.

=== Undergraduate research ===
The university is a member of the Council of Undergraduate Research and the National Council of Undergraduate Research. Most departments offer courses in methodology, and the university's Office of Undergraduate Research organizes additional workshops on writing proposals, analyzing data, and using human participants. Students can participate in A Katrina Recovery Initiative (AKRI), Louisiana Alliance for Minority Participation (LAMP), and the Undergraduate Research & Creative Work Competition. The university also produces the Dillard University Journal of Undergraduate Research (DUJOUR), which publishes the findings and articles of finished undergraduate research projects.

=== Institute of Jazz Culture (IOJC) ===
The Institute of Jazz Culture was established in 2002 by founding director, Irvin Mayfield at the intersection of community, jazz and education. Under the current leadership of Edward Anderson, Assistant Professor of Music and Director of the IOJC, the institute is producing curriculum and programming on the collegiate and the secondary levels.

=== Dual degree programs ===
Dillard has dual degree programs in multiple disciplines with institutions such as Louisiana State University, Tulane University, University of New Orleans, Georgia Institute of Technology, Columbia University, Texas Chiropractic College, and Western Michigan University.

== Athletics ==
The Dillard athletic teams are called the Bleu Devils and Lady Bleu Devils. The university is a member of the National Association of Intercollegiate Athletics (NAIA), primarily competing in the HBCU Athletic Conference (HBCUAC), formerly known as the Gulf Coast Athletic Conference (GCAC), since the 1981–82 academic year.

Dillard competes in 12 intercollegiate varsity sports: Men's sports include baseball, basketball, cross country, tennis and track & field; while women's sports include basketball, cross country, tennis, track & field and volleyball; and co-ed sports include cheerleading and dance.

=== Facilities ===
The Dillard basketball teams and volleyball team play at Dent Hall.

== Campus ==
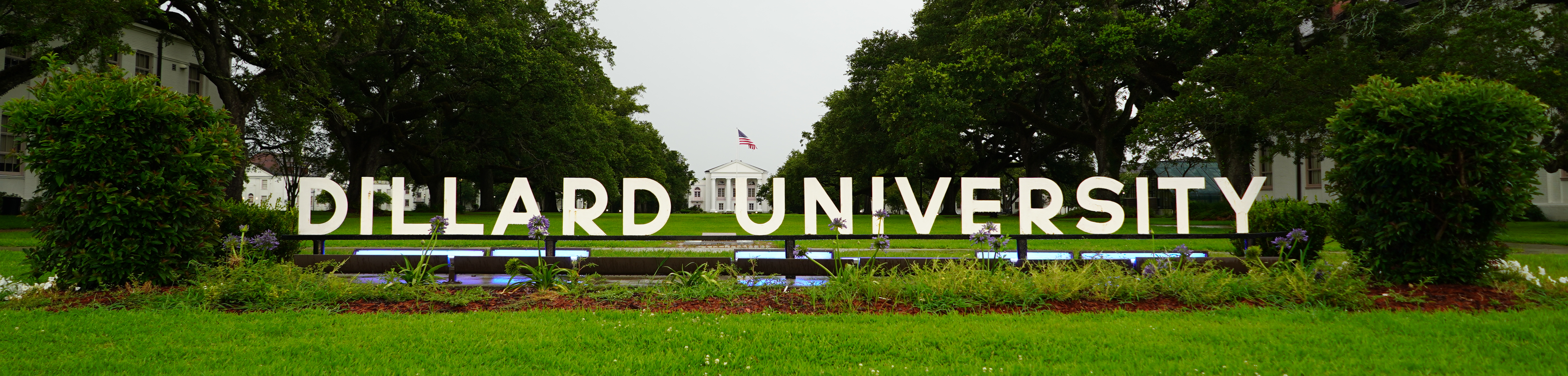
Dillard University campus on Gentilly Boulevard

Dillard University's campus, designed by architect Moïse H. Goldstein, is located on 55 acres (22.3 ha) in the suburban-like Gentilly neighborhood of the New Orleans 7th Ward district. The campus is anchored by Neoclassical architecture and live oak trees. The double tree-lined "Avenue of the Oaks" forms the focal point of the gated campus.

=== Academic buildings ===
Michael & Shaun Jones Hall(Also, referred to as Jones Hall), previously known as DUICEF (Dillard University International Center for Economic Freedom), was built in 2004. It houses the offices of the Division of Education & Psychology and the Division of Social Sciences, and computer and language laboratories.

Howard House, built in 1936, was originally a guest house, but currently is home to the business program. The building was named in honor of New Orleans native Alvin Pike Howard (1889–1937), successful businessman, former professor of Tulane University and former director of Hibernia National Bank; he is a noteworthy contributor to the development of Dillard University.

The Professional Schools Building is the newest academic building on campus. It was dedicated in 2010. The building is home to academic and research programs for the College of Business, School of Nursing, School of Public Health, and the Department of Science, Technology, Engineering and Mathematics.

Rosenwald Hall is a hall at Dillard University. Dillard's first permanent building was originally the campus library. It was built in May 1934. The building is named in honor of philanthropist Julius Rosenwald, to whom the building was dedicated in June 1948. This building houses the university's administrative offices and was under construction due to damage in the aftermath of Hurricane Katrina, but has since re-opened.

Samuel DuBois Cook Fine Arts and Communications Center at Dillard University, New Orleans, was built in 1993. The building is named in honor of Dillard University's sixth president, Samuel DuBois Cook. With his tenure came the start of the modernization of Dillard University's infrastructure. In the building are the Fine Arts Gallery and studios, state-of-the-art television and recording studios, the Music Department, the Drama Department and a theater, and a radio station.

Stern Hall is a hall at Dillard University. Dillard's science building was built in 1952. It is named in honor of Edgar Bloom Stern, a prominent financier and philanthropist of New Orleans. The building was renovated in 1952 and again in 1968. In the building are the Division of Nursing, Division of Natural Sciences, two computer labs, Biology, Chemistry and Physics labs as well as a learning center sponsored by the Louisiana Alliance for Minority Participation (LAMP) program.

=== Athletic facilities ===
Dent Hall at Dillard University, New Orleans, is the university's gymnasium. It was named in honor of Albert W. Dent, the university's third president. It was built in 1969 at the end of his service. Dent Hall is the home of the Bleu Devils and the Lady Bleu Devils basketball teams (Athletics Department). In this building are The Division of Campus Life, Career Services, Student Development, Student Government Association, the Daniel C. Thompson/Samuel Dubois Cook Honors Program, offices, classrooms, computer labs, a dance studio, a weight center and an Olympic-size swimming pool.

Henson Hall is Dillard University's old gymnasium, which was built in 1950 and renovated in 1990. The building is named in honor of an explorer and co-discoverer of the North Pole, Matthew Alexander Henson. He was the first human of African descent to reach the North Pole. The university's bookstore and temporary library are housed in Henson Hall due to space constraints following Hurricane Katrina.

=== Library ===
Will W. Alexander Library is Dillard University's library. It was built in 1961. The library was dedicated in honor of the first acting president of Dillard University, Will W. Alexander on October 22, 1961. The library houses an extensive collection of books, journals, microform and newspapers, as well as such historical documents as the papers of the American Missionary Association of the United Church of Christ. The library was damaged in the aftermath of Hurricane Katrina and reopened in April 2008.

=== Chapel ===
Lawless Memorial Chapel is Dillard University's chapel. It was built in 1955. Chapel was dedicated to the memory of Alfred Lawless Jr. and his son Theodore K. Lawless on October 23, 1955. Now named Lawless Assembly Hall, it is the only building on Dillard's campus that did not suffer flood damage in the aftermath of Hurricane Katrina.

=== On-campus housing ===
Camphor Hall is a dormitory at Dillard University, built in 1947. This female dormitory was originally a male dormitory. The building was named in honor of a Louisiana native, educator and missionary, Bishop Alexander Priestly Camphor. This dormitory is connected to Hartzell Hall.

Hartzell Hall is a dormitory at Dillard University, built in 1935. Hartzell is named in honor of Joseph Crane Hartzell, a missionary bishop for the Methodist Episcopal Church. The building was originally a junior and senior female dormitory, and re-opened in the fall of 2013. This dormitory is connected to Camphor Hall.

Straight Hall is a dormitory at Dillard University, built in 1936 and renovated in 1957. Straight Hall was originally a female dormitory in its earliest days. The building is named in honor of Seymour Straight, president of the Board of Trustees of Straight College, which opened in 1869 and later in 1930 merged with New Orleans University to form Dillard University. Re-opened in the spring of 2013.

Williams Hall is a female dormitory building located to the left of Kearny hall. It was dedicated in honor of noted New Orleanian educator and philanthropist Fannie C. Williams (1882–1980) in June 1946. The building was renovated in 2000 and became a co-ed dormitory in 2014.

Gentilly Gardens is on campus apartment style housing at Dillard University. These co-ed apartment blocks house junior and senior students.

Nelson Complex consisted of three modular buildings that served as undergraduate housing for students. Named after William Nelson, the first African American president of the university, it was destroyed by fire during Hurricane Katrina.

=== Student center ===
Kearny Hall is the student center at Dillard University. It was built in 1935 and renovated in 1966 and 1996. This building is named in honor of New Orleanian Warren Kearny, Trustee of Dillard University. Kearny Hall is located at the center of the campus. In the building are a lounge area, post office, cafeteria, food service offices, as well as the Student Government Association office. The cafeteria section was remodeled during the summer of 2019, updating the interior design.

=== President's house ===
Built in 1936, the president's residence has been renovated three times: 1964, 1972 and 1997. It has been home to six of the seven presidents of Dillard University. It now serves as the Alumni House.

== Notable alumni ==
The following notable individuals are alumni of Dillard University, Straight University, or New Orleans University:

| Name | Class year | Notability | Reference(s) |
|---|---|---|---|
| James W. Ames | 1882 | Founder, Dunbar Hospital, the first black hospital in Detroit, MI | |
| Harold Battiste Jr. | 1952 | Jazz saxophonist, composer and arranger; musical director for Sonny & Cher, Dr. John and many others; arranger for Sam Cooke | |
| John W. E. Bowen Sr. | 1878 | Among first African Americans to receive a PhD | |
| Napoleon Bracy Jr. | 2000 | Member of the Alabama House of Representatives | |
| Jericho Brown | 1998 | Award-winning poet | |
| Winifred Burks-Houck | | Environmental organic chemist and the first female president of National Organization for the Professional Advancement of Black Chemists and Chemical Engineers (NOBCChE) | |
| Sherman Copelin | 1965 | Member, Louisiana House of Representatives | |
| Dave Dennis | 1968 | Civil rights activist, Algebra Project | |
| Roger Donald Dickerson | 1955 | Pianist and composer | |
| W. T. Handy, Jr. | 1948 | Bishop of the Missouri Annual Conference of the United Methodist Church | |
| Patrick O. Jefferson | 1990 | Member of the Louisiana House of Representatives for District 11; lawyer from Arcadia | |
| Kimberly S. Johnson | | Professor of Medicine at Duke University | |
| Ernest Lyon | 1888 | Minister, former United States Ambassador to Liberia, and founder of the Maryland Industrial and Agricultural Institute for Colored Youths | |
| Ellis Marsalis Jr. | 1955 | Jazz pianist and music educator; father of jazz artists: Branford, Wynton, Jason and Delfeayo; retired director of Jazz Studies, University of New Orleans | |
| Orelia Merchant | 1992 | Federal judge for the United States District Court for the Eastern District of New York, since 2023 | |
| Garrett Morris | 1958 | Comedian/actor (Saturday Night Live, The Jamie Foxx Show, Martin) | |
| Khalid Abdul Muhammad | 1970 | National spokesman, Nation of Islam | |
| Alice Dunbar Nelson | 1892 | Women's rights activist, poet, author and lecturer; wife of Paul Laurence Dunbar | |
| Alfred Lloyd Norris | 1960 | Bishop, United Methodist Church | |
| Revius Ortique Jr. | 1947 | First African American to serve on the Louisiana State Supreme Court (now retired); member of the Dillard University Board of Trustees | |
| Brenda Marie Osbey | 1978 | Poet Laureate of Louisiana | |
| P.B.S. Pinchback | 1885 | First African-American governor in the United States; 24th governor of Louisiana | |
| Renée Gill Pratt | | Local New Orleans politician; director of the Center for Student Retention and Success in Southern University at New Orleans | |
| Beah Richards | 1948 | Actress of stage, screen and television' poet, playwright and author | |
| Joyce M. Roche | 1970 | President and CEO of Girls, Inc.; former president and chief operating officer of Carson, Inc.; first female chairperson of the Dillard University Board of Trustees | |
| Ruth J. Simmons | 1967 | First African-American president of an Ivy League University (18th president of Brown University, Providence, Rhode Island); first African-American president of a "Seven Sisters" school (ninth president of Smith College) | |
| Carl E. Stewart | 1971 | Judge, U.S. Fifth Circuit Court of Appeals in Louisiana | |
| Jimmy Womack | 1976 | Minister, Member of the Michigan House of Representatives, seventh district | |
