= Early life and academic career of Woodrow Wilson =

Early life of US president Woodrow Wilson

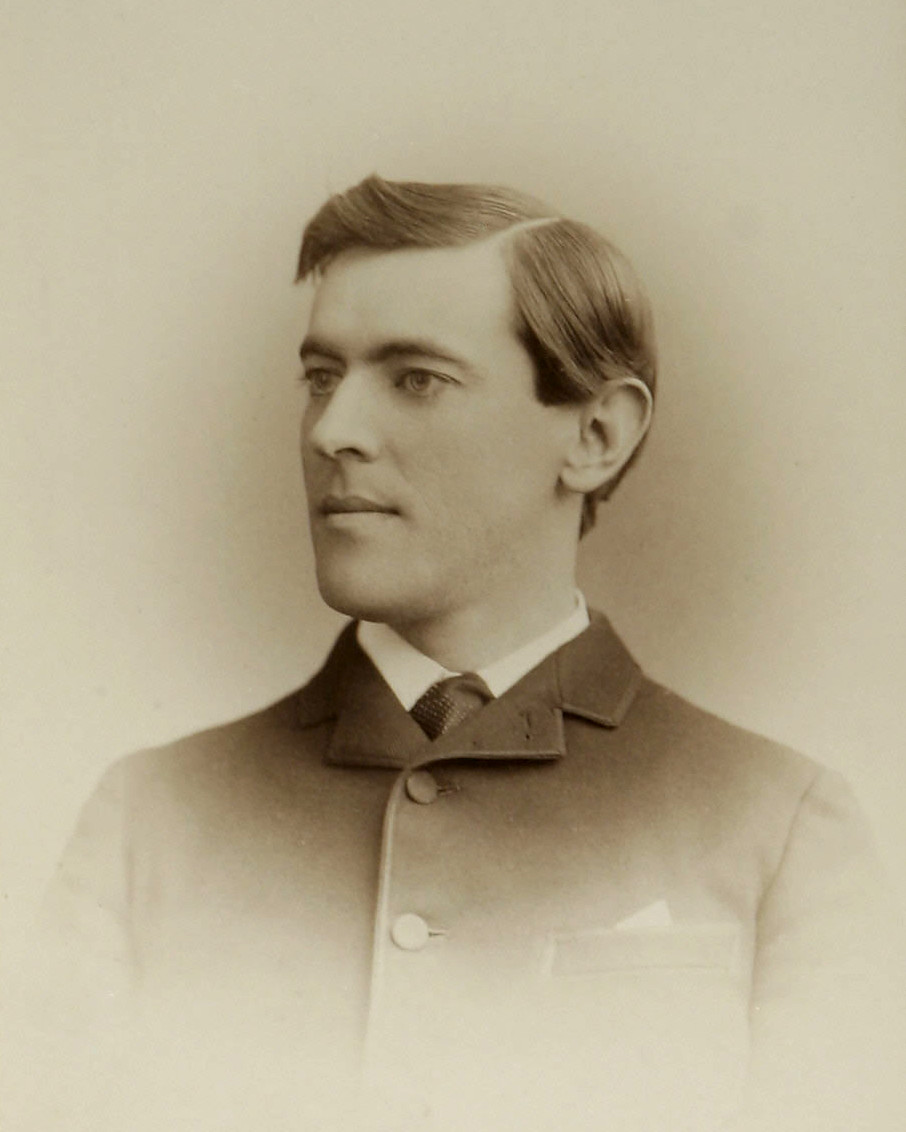
Woodrow Wilson, photograph by Pach Bros c. 1875

Thomas Woodrow Wilson (December 28, 1856 – February 3, 1924) was an American politician and academic who served as the 28th president of the United States. The early life of Woodrow Wilson covers the time period from his birth in late 1856 through his entry into electoral politics in 1910. Wilson spent his early years in the American South, mainly in Augusta, Georgia, during the Civil War and Reconstruction. After earning a Ph.D. in political science from Johns Hopkins University, Wilson taught at various schools before becoming the president of Princeton University. Wilson later went onto become governor of New Jersey from 1911 to 1913, a major progressive reformer and then finally, President of the United States from 1913 to 1921.

== Early life ==
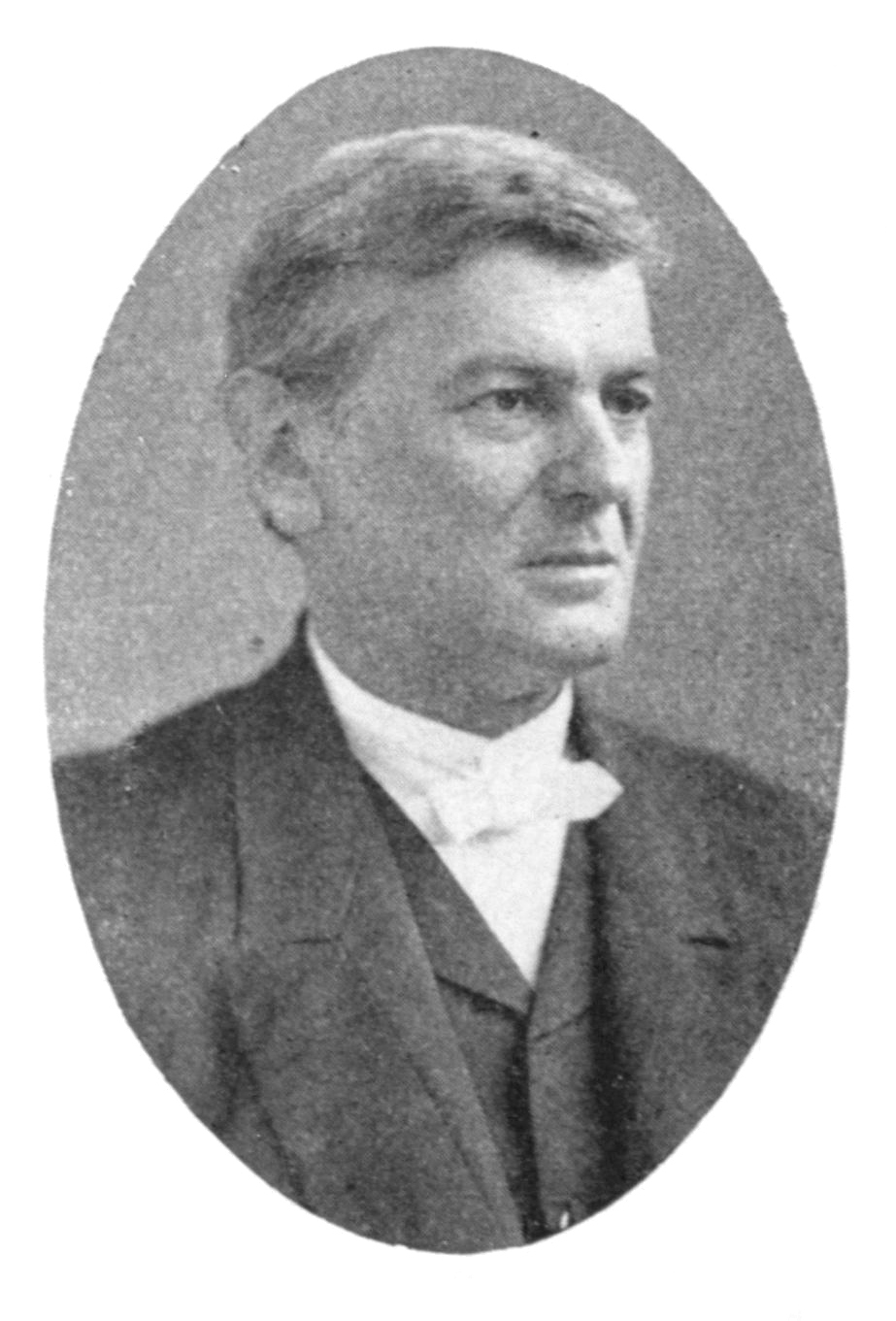
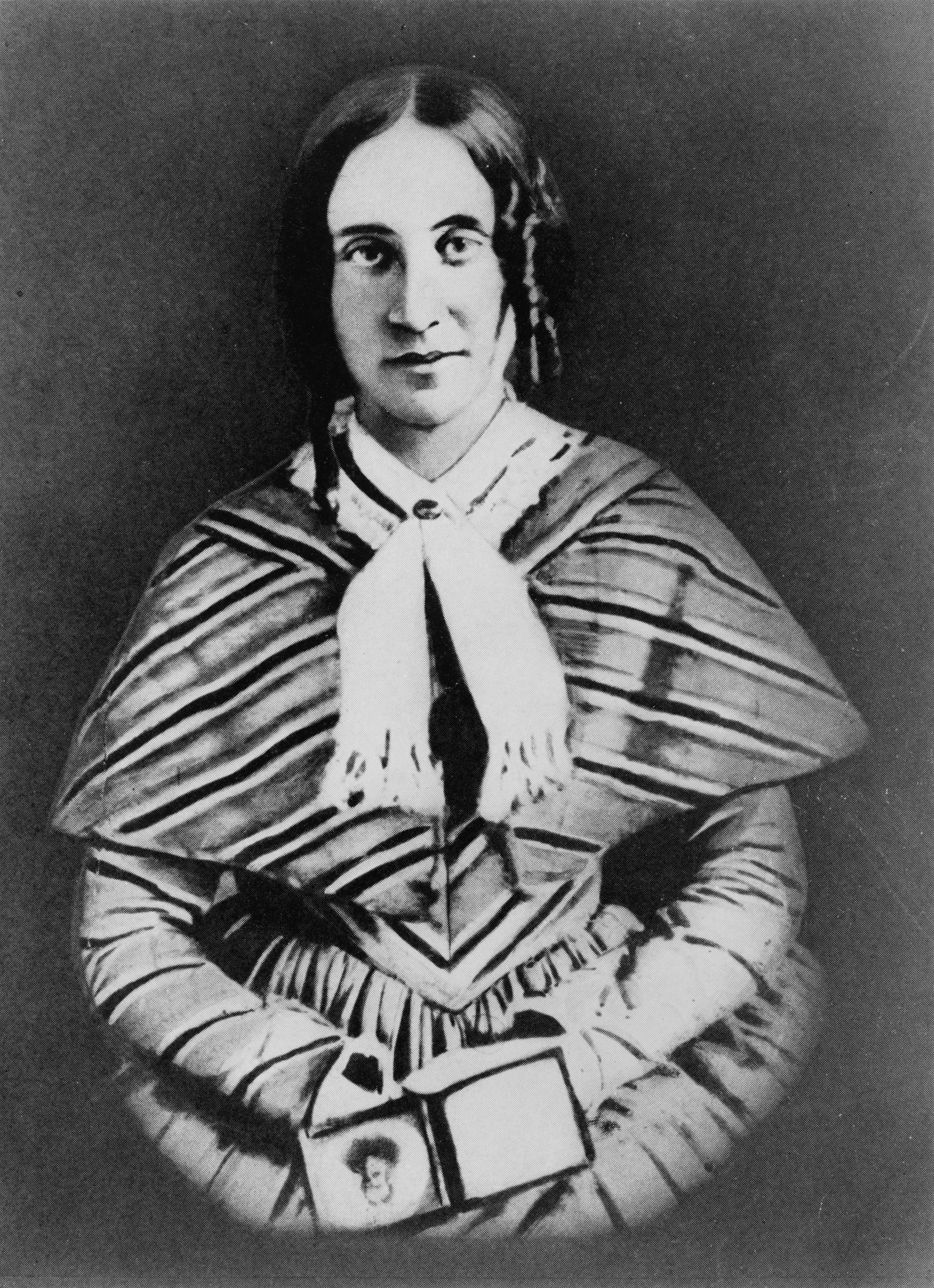
Woodrow Wilson's parents, Rev. Joseph and Jessie Wilson

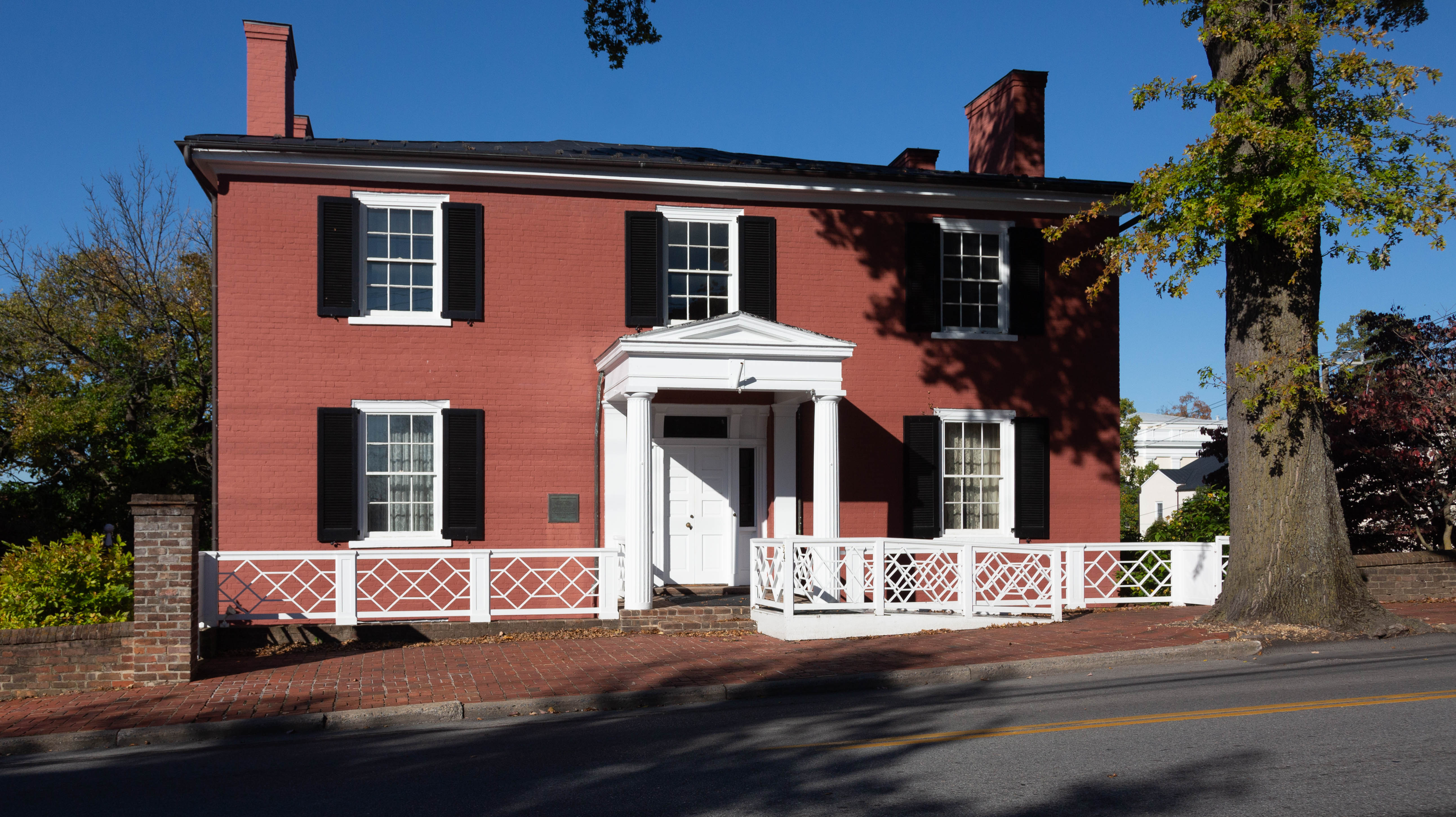
Wilson's birth home in Staunton, Virginia

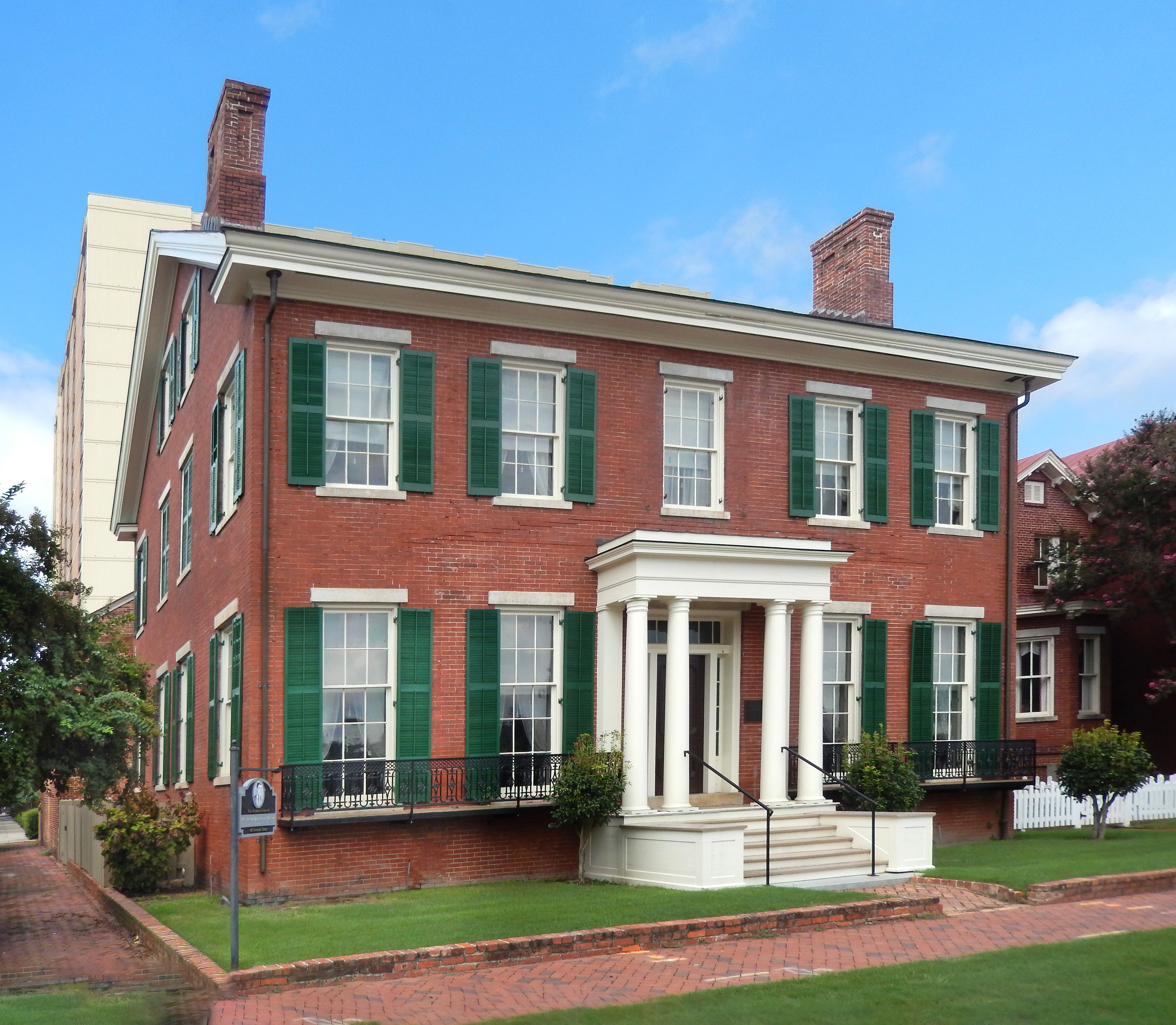
Wilson's boyhood home in Augusta, Georgia, where he lived from 1859 to 1870

Thomas Woodrow Wilson was born to a family of Scots-Irish and Scottish descent, in Staunton, Virginia. He was the third of four children and the first son of Joseph Ruggles Wilson (1822–1903) and Jessie Janet Woodrow (1826–1888). Wilson's paternal grandparents had immigrated to the United States from Strabane, County Tyrone, Ireland in 1807, settling in Steubenville, Ohio. His grandfather James Wilson published a pro-tariff and anti-slavery newspaper, The Western Herald and Gazette. Wilson's maternal grandfather, Reverend Thomas Woodrow, migrated from Paisley, Scotland to Carlisle, England, before moving to Chillicothe, Ohio in the late 1830s. Joseph met Jessie while she was attending a girl's academy in Steubenville, and the two married on June 7, 1849. Soon after the wedding, Joseph was ordained as a Presbyterian pastor and assigned to serve in Staunton. Thomas was born in The Manse, a house of the Staunton First Presbyterian Church where Joseph served. Wilson's parents gave him the nickname "Tommy", which he used through his undergraduate college years. Before he was two, the family moved to Augusta, Georgia. Wilson grew up in a home where slave labor was utilized.

Wilson's earliest memory was of playing in his yard and standing near the front gate of the Augusta parsonage at the age of three, when he heard a passerby announce in disgust that Abraham Lincoln had been elected and that a war was coming. By 1861, both of Wilson's parents had come to fully identify with the Southern United States and they supported the Confederacy during the American Civil War. Wilson's father was one of the founders of the Southern Presbyterian Church in the United States (PCUS) after it split from the Northern Presbyterians in 1861. He became minister of the First Presbyterian Church in Augusta, and the family lived there until 1870.

After the end of the Civil War, Wilson began attending a nearby school, where classmates included future Supreme Court Justice Joseph Rucker Lamar and future ambassador to Switzerland Pleasant A. Stovall. Though Wilson's parents placed a high value on education, he struggled with reading and writing until the age of thirteen, possibly because of developmental dyslexia. From 1870 to 1874, Wilson lived in Columbia, South Carolina, where his father was a theology professor at the Columbia Theological Seminary. In 1873, Wilson became a communicant member of the Columbia First Presbyterian Church; he remained a member throughout his life.

Wilson attended Davidson College in North Carolina for the 1873–74 school year, but transferred as a freshman to the College of New Jersey (now Princeton University). He studied political philosophy and history, joined the Phi Kappa Psi fraternity, was active in the Whig literary and debating society, and organized the Liberal Debating Society. He was also elected secretary of the school's football association, president of the school's baseball association, and managing editor of the student newspaper. In the hotly contested presidential election of 1876, Wilson declared his support for the Democratic Party and its nominee, Samuel J. Tilden. Influenced by the work of Walter Bagehot, as well as the declining power of the presidency in the aftermath of the Civil War, Wilson developed a plan to reform American government along the lines of the British parliamentary system. Political scientist George W. Ruiz writes that Wilson's "admiration for the parliamentary style of government, and the desire to adapt some of its features to the American system, remained an enduring element of Woodrow Wilson's political thought." Wilson's essay on governmental reform was published in the International Review after winning the approval of editor Henry Cabot Lodge.

After graduating from Princeton in 1879, Wilson attended the University of Virginia School of Law, where he was involved in the Virginia Glee Club and served as president of the Jefferson Literary and Debating Society. After poor health forced his withdrawal from the University of Virginia, Wilson continued to study law on his own while living with his parents in Wilmington, North Carolina.

Wilson was admitted to the Georgia bar and made a brief attempt at establishing a legal practice in Atlanta in 1882. Though he found legal history and substantive jurisprudence interesting, he abhorred the day-to-day procedural aspects. After less than a year, he abandoned his legal practice to pursue the study of political science and history.

== Personal life ==
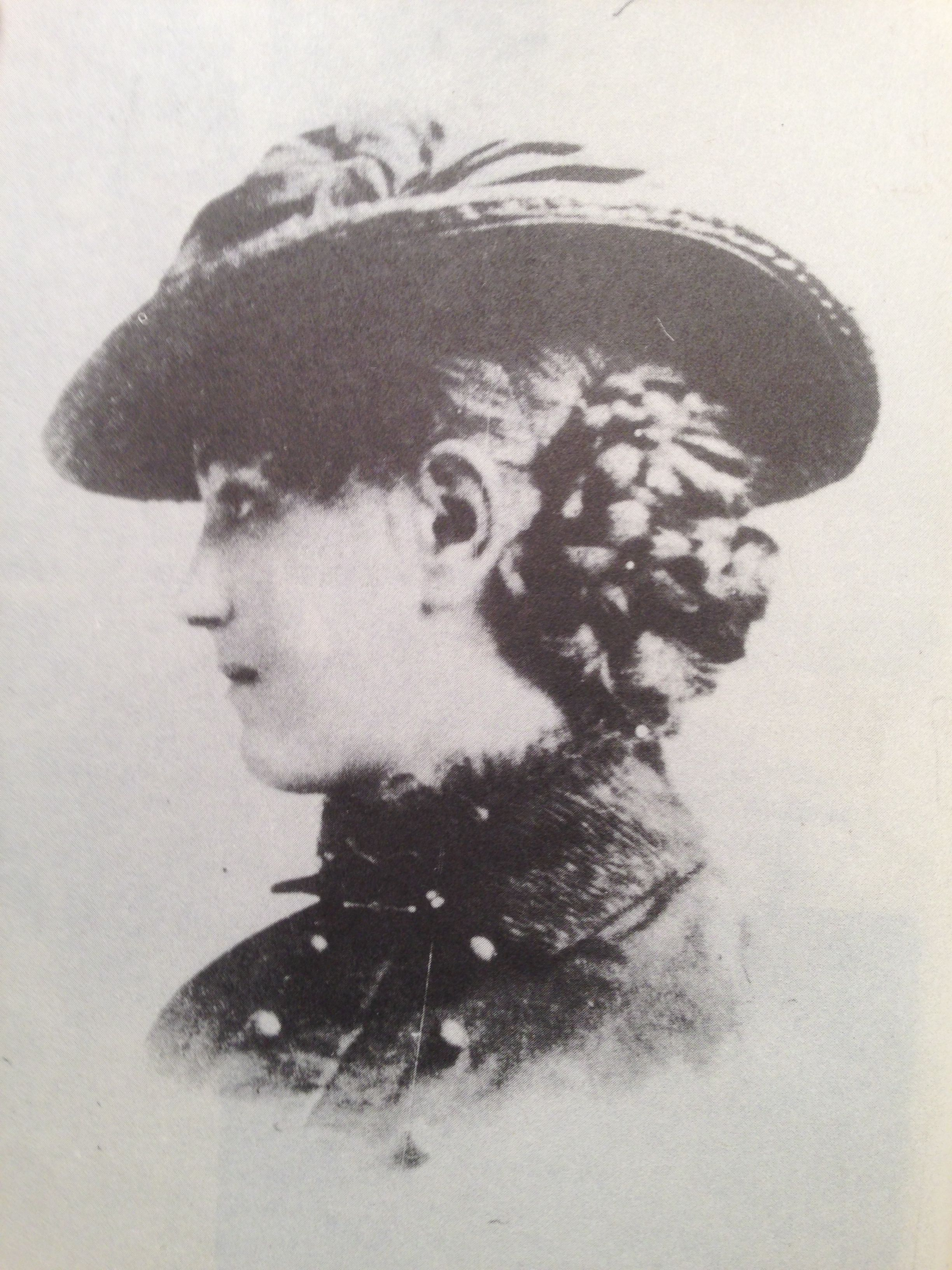
Ellen Axson, Wilson's future wife, in 1883

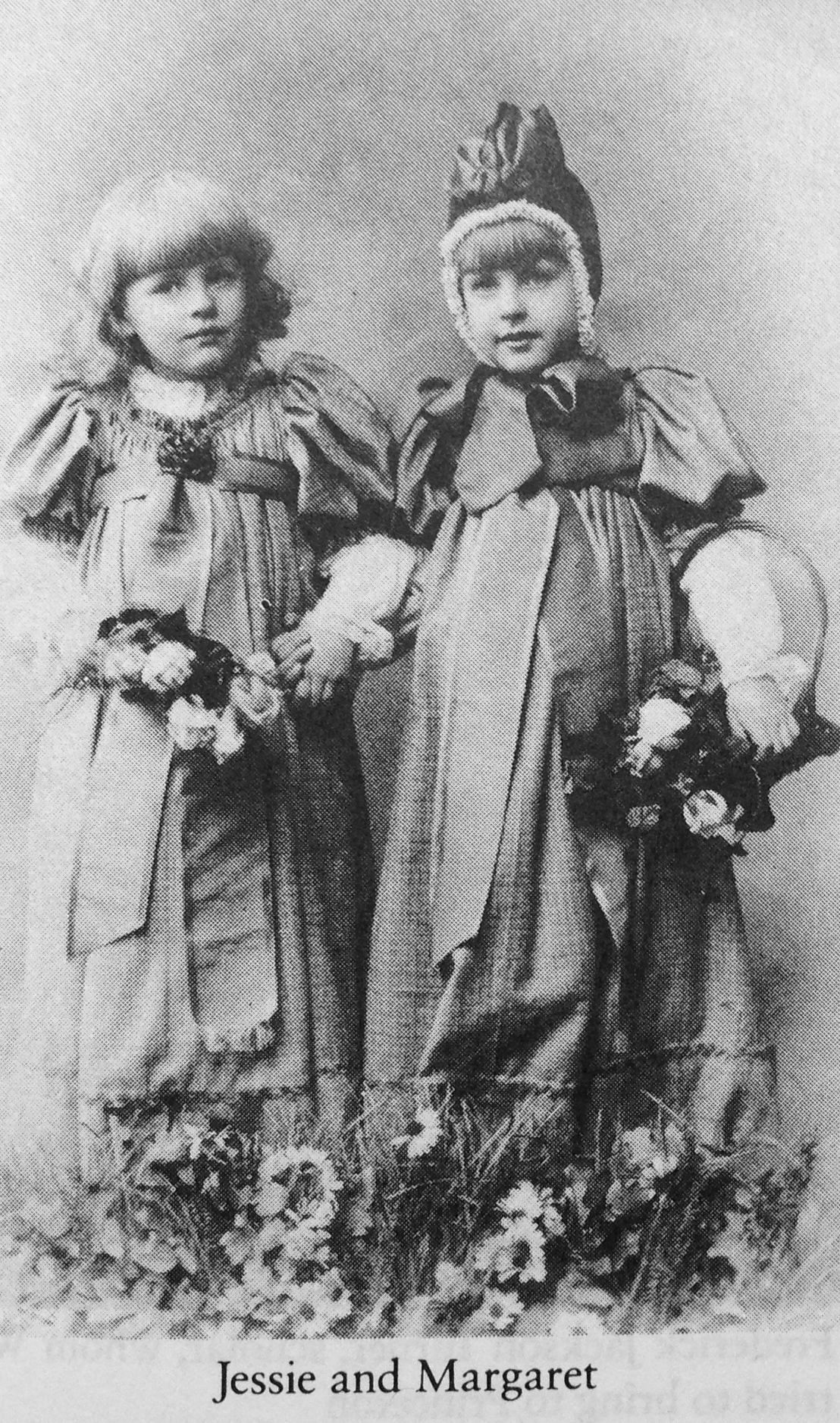
Daughters Jessie and Margaret

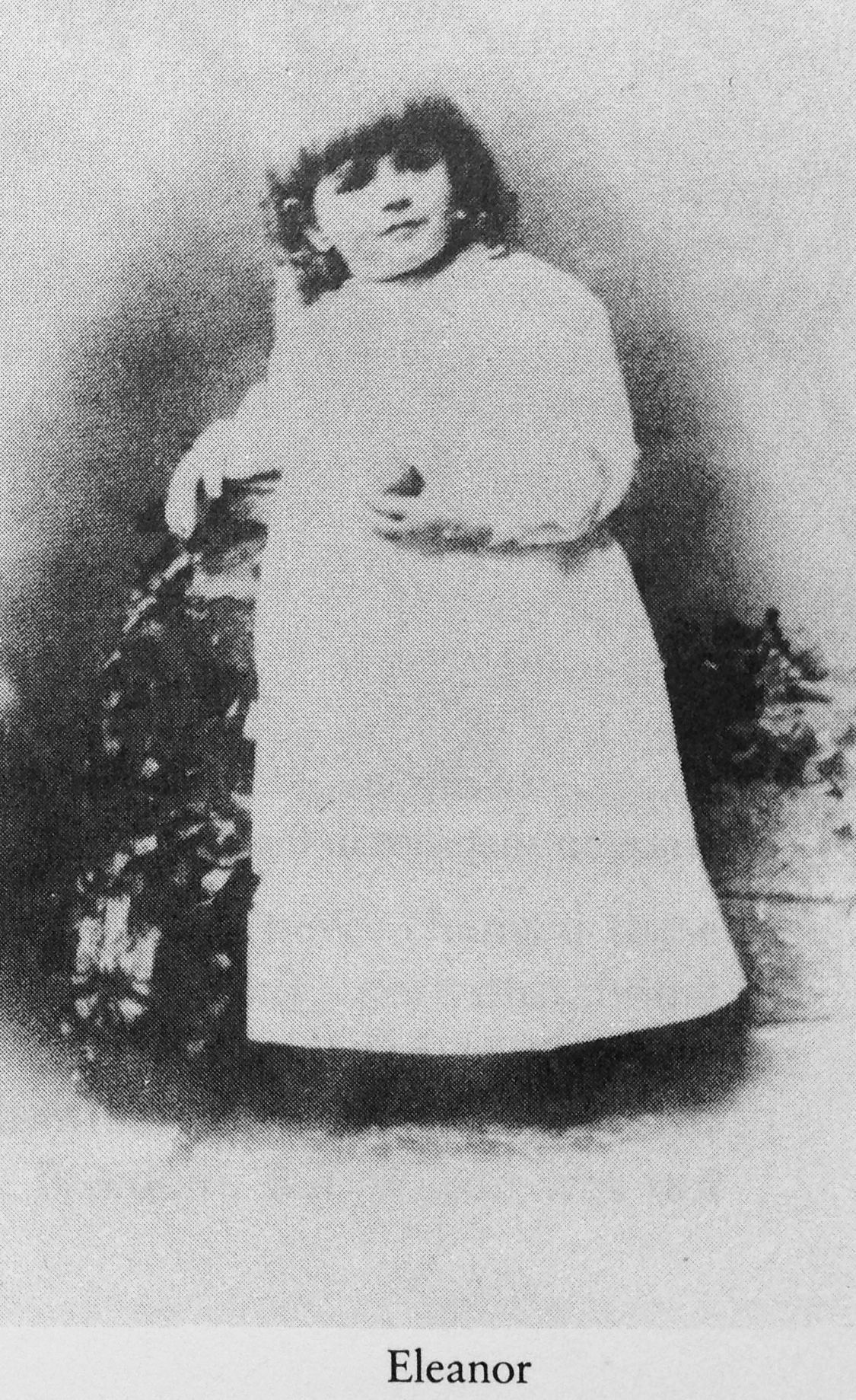
Daughter Eleanor

In 1883, Wilson met and fell in love with Ellen Louise Axson, the daughter of a Presbyterian minister from Savannah, Georgia. He proposed marriage in September 1883; she accepted, but they agreed to postpone marriage while Wilson attended graduate school. Wilson's marriage to Ellen was complicated by traumatic developments in her family; in late 1883, Ellen's father Edward, suffering from depression, was admitted to the Georgia State Mental Hospital where, in 1884, he committed suicide. After recovering from the initial shock, Ellen gained admission to the Art Students League of New York. After graduation, she pursued portrait art and received a medal for one of her works from the Paris International Exposition. She happily agreed to sacrifice further independent artistic pursuits in order to keep her marriage commitment, and in 1885 she and Wilson married. She strongly supported his career and learned German so that she could help translate works of political science that were relevant to Wilson's research.

Their first child, Margaret, was born in April 1886, and their second child, Jessie, was born in August 1887. Their third and final child, Eleanor, was born in October 1889. Wilson and his family lived in a seven bedroom Tudor Revival house near Princeton, New Jersey from 1896 to 1902, when they moved to Prospect House on Princeton's campus. In 1913, Jessie married Francis Bowes Sayre Sr., who later served as High Commissioner to the Philippines. In 1914, Eleanor married William Gibbs McAdoo, who served as the Secretary of the Treasury under Wilson and later represented California in the United States Senate.

When Wilson began vacationing in Bermuda in 1906, he met a socialite, Mary Hulbert Peck. Their visits together became a regular occurrence on his return. Wilson in his letters home to Ellen openly related these gatherings as well his other social events. According to biographer August Heckscher, Wilson's friendship with Peck became the topic of frank discussion between Wilson and his wife. Wilson historians have not conclusively established there was an affair; but Wilson did on one occasion write a musing in shorthand—on the reverse side of a draft for an editorial: "my precious one, my beloved Mary." Wilson also sent very personal letters to her which would later be used against him by his adversaries.

Ellen died from Bright's disease in August 1914, the second year of Wilson's presidency.

Following the death of his first wife, Wilson met and began a courtship with Edith Bolling Galt; the two married in a quiet ceremony at the White House in December 1915.

== Academic career ==
=== Professor ===
In late 1883, Wilson entered Johns Hopkins University, a new graduate institution in Baltimore built on the Humboldtian model of higher education, the education model of many German universities, that was dedicated to research. In order to successfully complete his Ph.D., Wilson studied the German language extensively. At times Wilson referenced German sources, both as an academic and during the lead up to America's entry into World War I; though he noted doing so took considerable time and effort as he was not fully fluent. Wilson hoped to become a professor, writing that "a professorship was the only feasible place for me, the only place that would afford leisure for reading and for original work, the only strictly literary berth with an income attached." During his time at Johns Hopkins, Wilson took courses by eminent scholars such as Herbert Baxter Adams, Richard T. Ely, and J. Franklin Jameson. Wilson spent much of his time at Johns Hopkins writing Congressional Government: A Study in American Politics, which grew out of a series of essays in which he examined the workings of the federal government. He received a Ph.D. in history of government from Johns Hopkins in 1886.

In early 1885, Houghton Mifflin published Congressional Government, which received a strong reception; one critic called it "the best critical writing on the American constitution which has appeared since the Federalist Papers." That same year, Wilson accepted a teaching position at Bryn Mawr College, a newly established women's college on the Philadelphia Main Line. Wilson taught at Bryn Mawr College from 1885 until 1888. He taught ancient Greek and Roman history, American history, political science, and other subjects. He sought to inspire "genuine living interest in the subjects of study" and asked students to "look into ancient times as if they were our own times." However at the time, there were only 42 students at the college, nearly all of them too passive for his taste. M. Carey Thomas, the dean, was a staunch feminist, and Wilson clashed with her over his contract, resulting in a bitter dispute. In 1888, Wilson left Bryn Mawr College and was not given a farewell. Following his departure from Bryn Mawr, Wilson took up a position at Wesleyan University in Middletown, Connecticut. At Wesleyan he coached the football team, founded a debate team, and taught graduate courses in political economy and Western history.

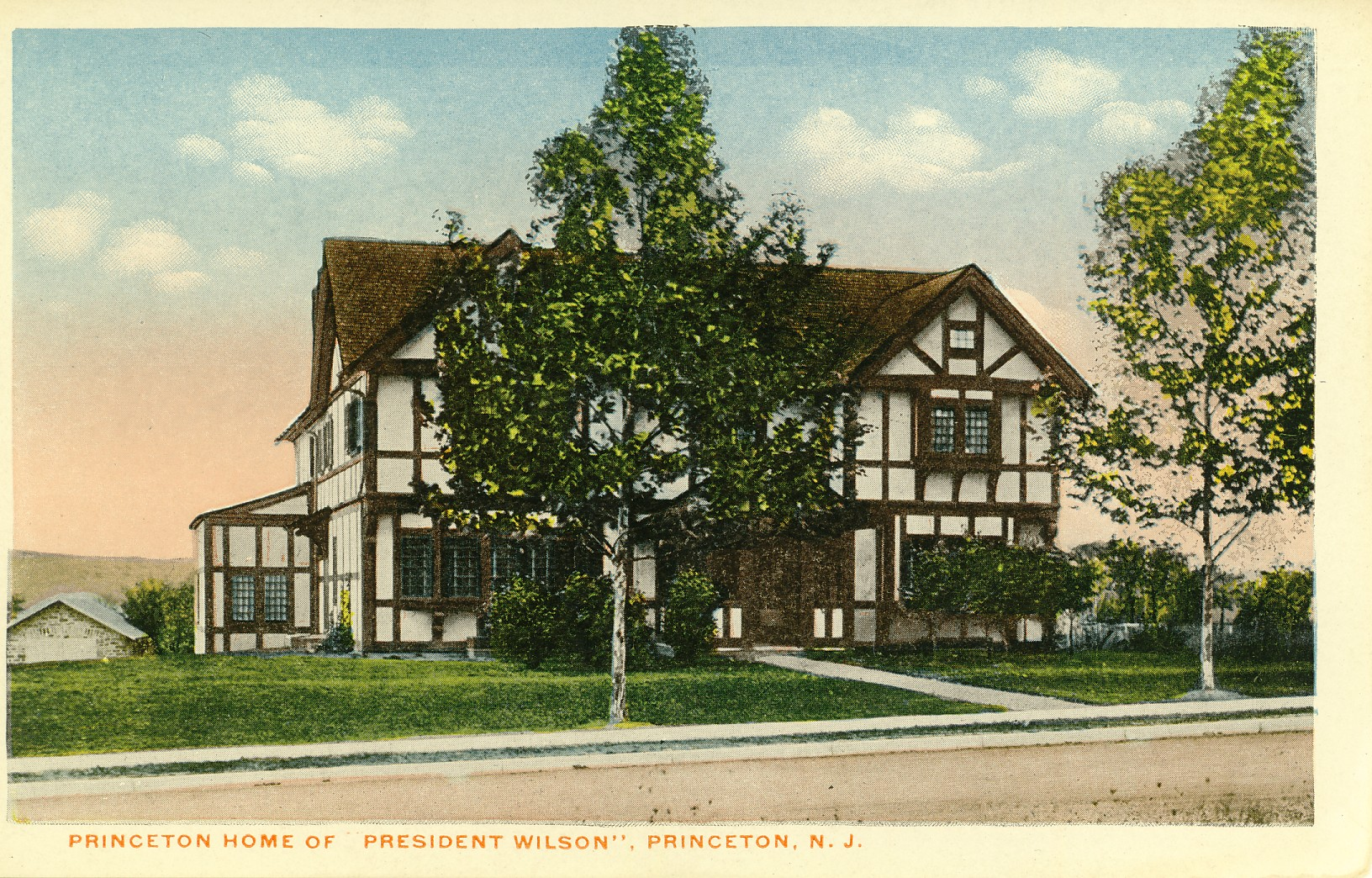
Wilson's home in Princeton, New Jersey

In February 1890, with the help of friends, Wilson was elected by the Princeton University Board of Trustees to the Chair of Jurisprudence and Political Economy, at an annual salary of $3,000 (equivalent to $107,500 in 2025). He quickly gained a reputation as a compelling speaker; one student described him as "the greatest class-room lecturer I ever have heard." During his time as a professor at Princeton, he also delivered a series of lectures at Johns Hopkins, New York Law School, and Colorado College. In 1896, Francis Landey Patton announced that Princeton would henceforth officially be known as Princeton University instead of the College of New Jersey, and he unveiled an ambitious program of expansion that included the establishment of a graduate school. In the 1896 presidential election, Wilson rejected Democratic nominee William Jennings Bryan and supported the conservative "Gold Democrat" nominee, John M. Palmer. Wilson's academic reputation continued to grow throughout the 1890s, and he turned down positions at Johns Hopkins, the University of Virginia, and other schools because he wanted to remain at Princeton.

==== Friendship with Thomas Dixon Jr ====
It was during his early years as a student at Johns Hopkins that Wilson met and befriended classmate and fellow Southerner, Thomas Dixon Jr. Dixon says in his memoirs that "we became intimate friends.... I spent many hours with him in [Wilson's room]." Dixon stayed at Johns Hopkins for only one semester before dropping out to pursue career on the stage. Wilson objected to Dixon's decision but the two remained friends. Though Dixon found great popular and financial success as both a writer and evangelical preaching, he is now known primarily as one of the time's most prolific promoters of white supremacy, being described as a "professional racist". In 1888, Dixon was asked to give the commencement address at Wake Forest University. Dixon, replied by politely turning down the offer, recommending Wilson be chosen instead. Dixon, spoke in incredibly high terms of the then generally obscure Wilson. A reporter at Wake Forest who heard Dixon's praises of Wilson put a story on the nation wire, giving Wilson his first national exposure. In 1915, when one of Dixon's books was made into a feature film, The Birth of a Nation, Dixon asked Wilson to screen the film at the White House, a request Wilson was happy to oblige for his old friend. The extremely racist nature of the film sparked great controversy as did Wilson's personal ties to Dixon; eventually Wilson reluctantly renounced the message of The Birth of a Nation.

=== Author ===
During his academic career, Wilson authored several works of history and political science and became a regular contributor to Political Science Quarterly, an academic journal. Wilson's first political work, Congressional Government (1885), critically described the U.S. system of government and advocated adopting reforms to move the U.S. closer to a parliamentary system. Wilson believed the Constitution had a "radical defect" because it did not establish a branch of government that could "decide at once and with conclusive authority what shall be done." He singled out the United States House of Representatives for particular criticism, writing,

"divided up, as it were, into forty-seven seignories, in each of which a standing committee is the court-baron and its chairman lord-proprietor. These petty barons, some of them not a little powerful, but none of them within reach [of] the full powers of rule, may at will exercise an almost despotic sway within their own shires, and may sometimes threaten to convulse even the realm itself."

Wilson's second publication was a textbook, entitled The State, that was used widely in college courses throughout the country until the 1920s. In The State, Wilson wrote that governments could legitimately promote the general welfare "by forbidding child labor, by supervising the sanitary conditions of factories, by limiting the employment of women in occupations hurtful to their health, by instituting official tests of the purity or the quality of goods sold, by limiting the hours of labor in certain trades, [and] by a hundred and one limitations of the power of unscrupulous or heartless men to out-do the scrupulous and merciful in trade or industry." He also wrote that charity efforts should be removed from the private domain and "made the imperative legal duty of the whole," a position which, according to historian Robert M. Saunders, seemed to indicate that Wilson "was laying the groundwork for the modern welfare state."

His third book, entitled Division and Reunion, was published in 1893. It became a standard university textbook for teaching mid- and late-19th century U.S. history. In 1897, Houghton Mifflin published Wilson's biography on George Washington; Berg describes it as "Wilson's poorest literary effort." Wilson's fourth major publication, a five-volume work entitled History of the American People, was the culmination of a series of articles written for Harper's, and was published in 1902. In 1908, Wilson published his last major scholarly work, Constitutional Government of the United States.

=== President of Princeton University ===
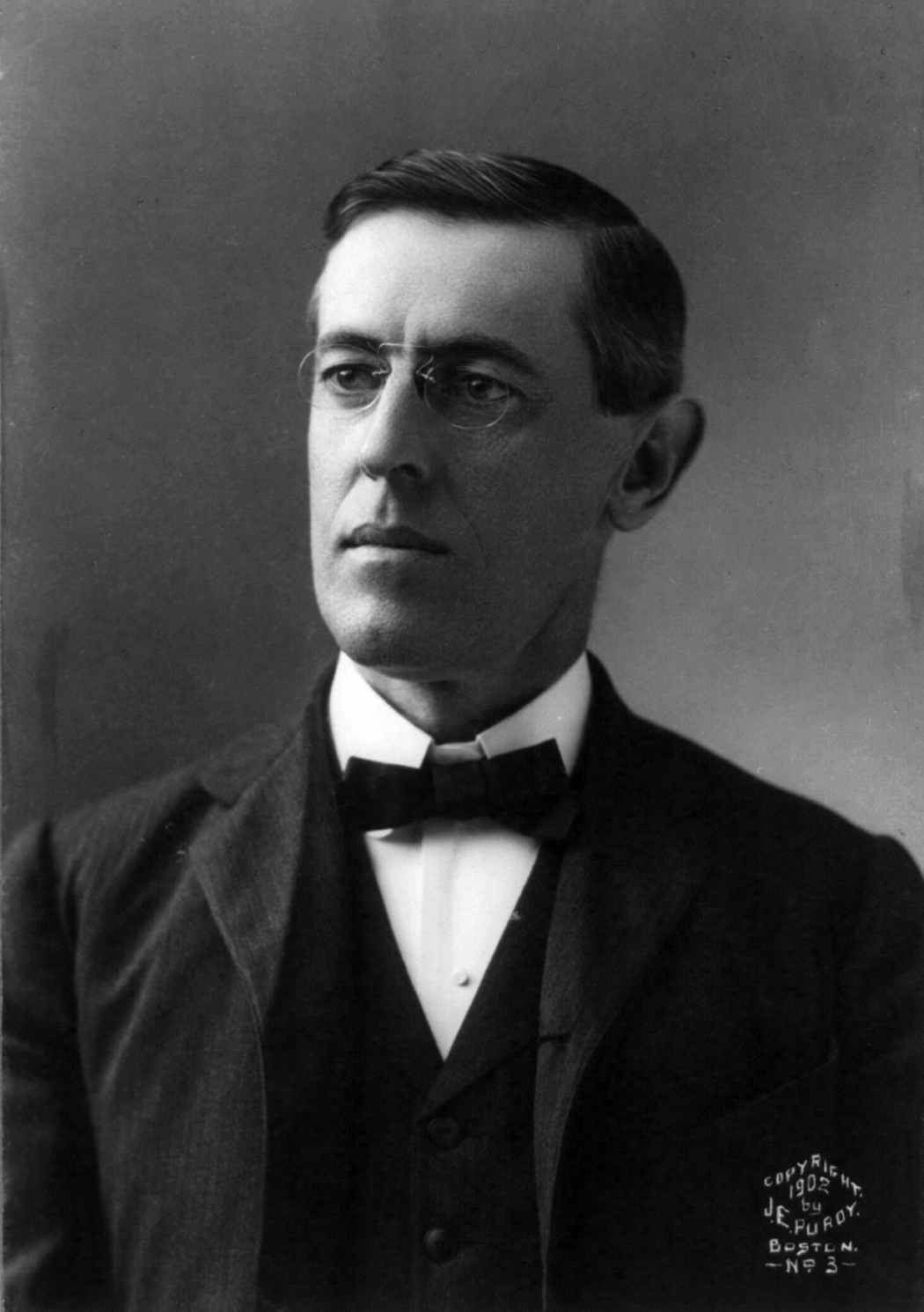
Wilson in 1902

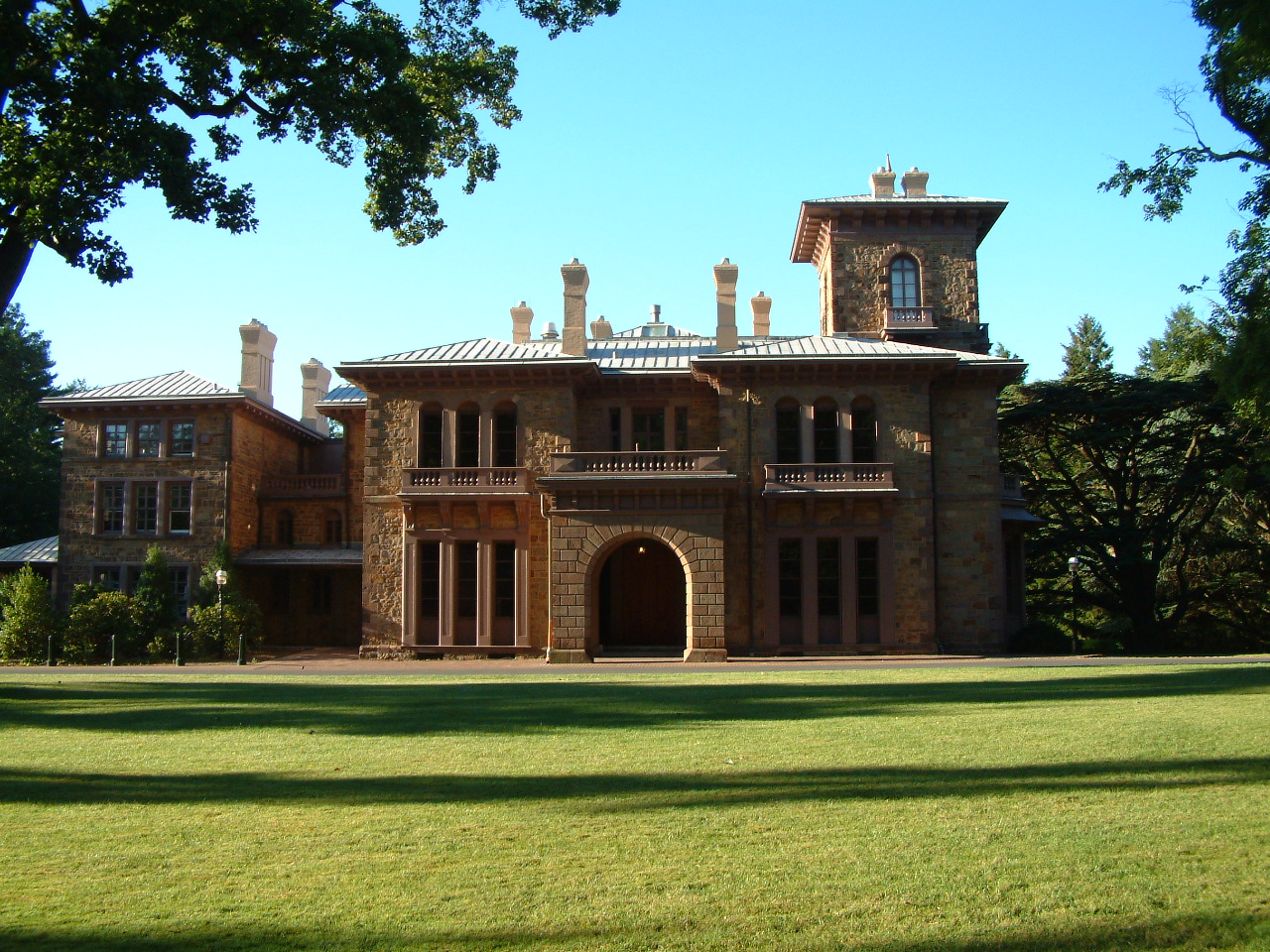
Prospect House, Wilson's home on Princeton University's campus

In June 1902, Princeton trustees promoted Professor Wilson to president, replacing Patton, whom the trustees perceived to be an inefficient administrator. Wilson aspired, as he told alumni, "to transform thoughtless boys performing tasks into thinking men." He tried to raise admission standards and to replace the "gentleman's C" with serious study. To emphasize the development of expertise, Wilson instituted academic departments and a system of core requirements. Students were to meet in groups of six under the guidance of teaching assistants known as preceptors. To fund these new programs, Wilson undertook an ambitious and successful fundraising campaign, convincing alumni such as Moses Taylor Pyne and philanthropists such as Andrew Carnegie to donate to the school.

Wilson appointed the first Jew and the first Roman Catholic to the Princeton faculty, and is credited with helping to liberate the board from domination by conservative Presbyterians. However, Wilson also worked to keep African Americans out of the school, even as other Ivy League schools were accepting small numbers of blacks. (Note: Though a handful of elite, Northern schools did admit African-American students, at the time, most colleges refused to accept black students. Most African-American college students attended black colleges and universities such as Howard University.) Wilson invited only one African-American guest (out of an estimated 150) to attend his installation ceremony, Booker T. Washington. Though most accounts agree Wilson respected Washington, he would not allow for him to be housed on campus with a member of the faculty (such arrangements had been made for all of the white guests coming from out of town to attend the ceremony) nor did Wilson invite Washington to either of the two dinner parties hosted by him and his wife following the event. Under Wilson, campus facilities remained segregated, and no African-Americans were hired as faculty or admitted as undergraduate students during his tenure. In 1909, Wilson received a letter from a young African-American man interested in applying to attend Princeton. Wilson had his assistant write back promptly that "it is altogether inadvisable for a colored man to enter Princeton." Princeton would not receive a single black student until 1947. In 1903, while speaking before a Princeton alumni group in Baltimore, Wilson made a joke at the expense of William Crum, the recently appointed African-American customs officer for the port of Charleston. Like many white Southerners, Wilson opposed Crum's appointment and in the course of his address referred to him as a "coon."

Wilson's efforts to reform Princeton earned him national notoriety, but they also took a toll on his health. In 1906, Wilson awoke to find himself blind in the left eye, the result of a blood clot and hypertension. Modern medical opinion surmises Wilson had suffered a stroke—he later was diagnosed, as his father had been, with hardening of the arteries. He began to exhibit his father's traits of impatience and intolerance, which would on occasion lead to errors of judgment.

Having reorganized the school's curriculum and established the preceptorial system, Wilson next attempted to curtail the influence of social elites at Princeton by abolishing the upper-class eating clubs. He proposed moving the students into colleges, also known as quadrangles, but Wilson's Quad Plan was met with fierce opposition from Princeton's alumni. In October 1907, due to the intensity of alumni opposition, the Board of Trustees instructed Wilson to withdraw the Quad Plan. Late in his tenure, Wilson had a confrontation with Andrew Fleming West, dean of the graduate school, and also West's ally ex-President Grover Cleveland, who was a trustee. Wilson wanted to integrate a proposed graduate school building into the campus core, while West preferred a more distant campus site. In 1909, Princeton's board accepted a gift made to the graduate school campaign subject to the graduate school being located off campus.

== Entry into politics (1910) ==
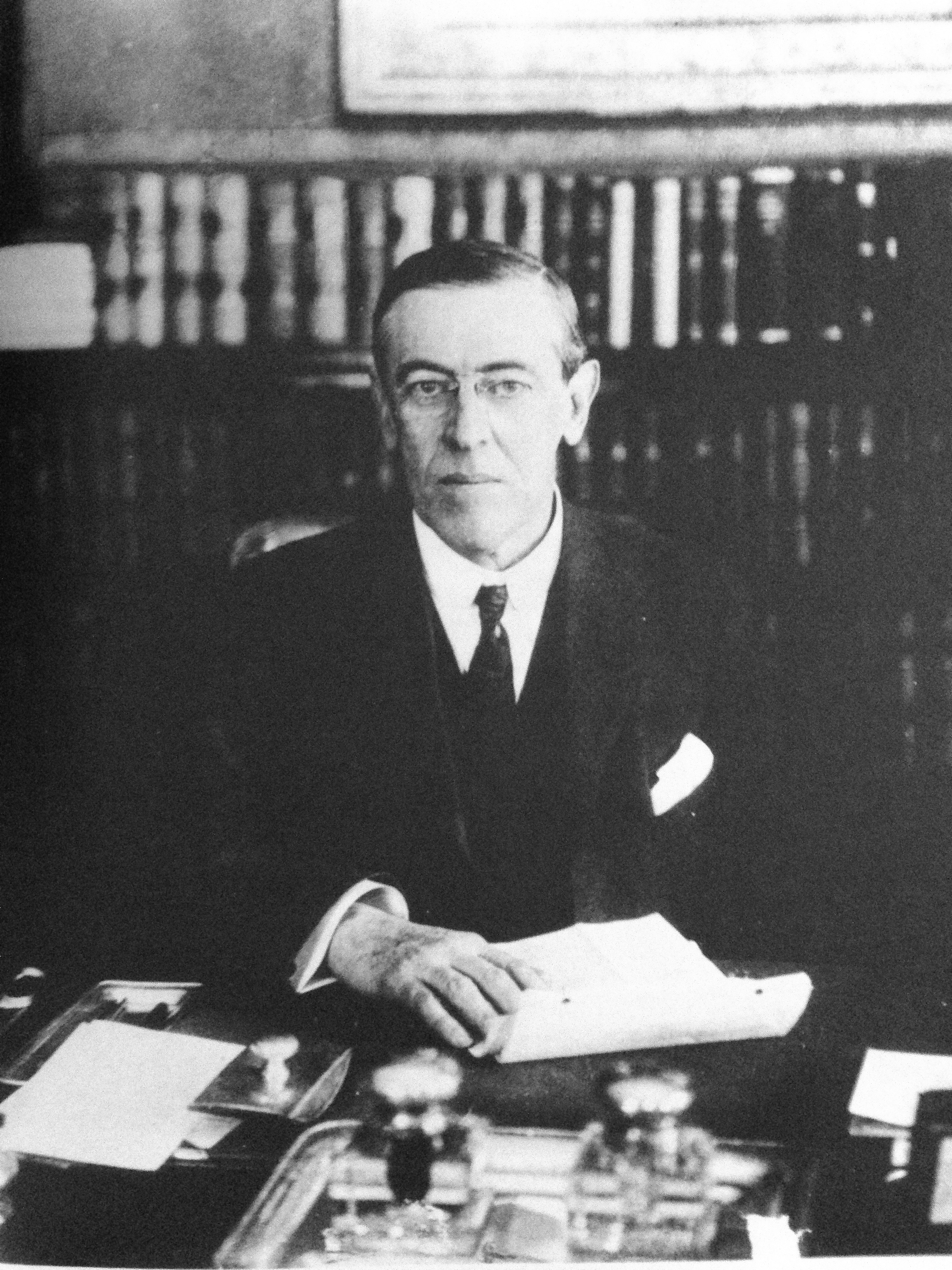
Wilson as New Jersey governor in 1911

Wilson became disenchanted with his job due to the resistance to his recommendations, and he began considering a run for office. Prior to the 1908 Democratic National Convention, Wilson dropped hints to some influential players in the Democratic Party of his interest in the ticket. While he had no real expectations of being placed on the ticket, he left instructions that he should not be offered the vice presidential nomination. Party regulars considered his ideas politically as well as geographically detached and fanciful, but the seeds had been sown. McGeorge Bundy in 1956 described Wilson's contribution to Princeton: "Wilson was right in his conviction that Princeton must be more than a wonderfully pleasant and decent home for nice young men; it has been more ever since his time".

By January 1910, Wilson had drawn the attention of James Smith Jr. and George Brinton McClellan Harvey, two leaders of New Jersey's Democratic Party, as a potential candidate in the upcoming gubernatorial election. Having lost the last five gubernatorial elections, New Jersey Democratic leaders decided to throw their support behind Wilson, an untested and unconventional candidate. Party leaders believed that Wilson's academic reputation made him the ideal spokesman against trusts and corruption, but they also hoped his inexperience in governing would make him easy to influence. Wilson agreed to accept the nomination if "it came to me unsought, unanimously, and without pledges to anybody about anything."

== Works ==
- Congressional Government: A Study in American Politics. Boston: Houghton, Mifflin, 1885.
- The State: Elements of Historical and Practical Politics. Boston: D.C. Heath, 1889.
- Division and Reunion, 1829–1889. New York, London, Longmans, Green, and Co., 1893.
- An Old Master and Other Political Essays. New York: Charles Scribner's Sons, 1893.
- Mere Literature and Other Essays. Boston: Houghton Mifflin, 1896.
- George Washington. New York: Harper & Brothers, 1897.
- The History of the American People. In five volumes. New York: Harper & Brothers, 1901–02. Vol. 1 | Vol. 2 | Vol. 3 | Vol. 4 | Vol. 5
- Constitutional Government in the United States. New York: Columbia University Press, 1908.
- The Free Life: A Baccalaureate Address. New York: Thomas Y. Crowell & Co., 1908.
- The New Freedom: A Call for the Emancipation of the Energies of a Generous People. New York: Doubleday, Page & Co., 1913. —Speeches
- The Road Away from Revolution. Boston: Atlantic Monthly Press, 1923.
- The Public Papers of Woodrow Wilson. Ray Stannard Baker and William E. Dodd (eds.) In six volumes. New York: Harper & Brothers, 1925–27.
- Study of public administration (Washington: Public Affairs Press, 1955)
- A Crossroads of Freedom: The 1912 Campaign Speeches of Woodrow Wilson. John Wells Davidson (ed.) New Haven, CT: Yale University Press, 1956.
- The Papers of Woodrow Wilson. Arthur S. Link (ed.) In 69 volumes. Princeton, NJ: Princeton University Press, 1967–1994.

== See also ==
- Presidency of Woodrow Wilson
- Joseph Patrick Tumulty
- Woodrow Wilson and race
- Progressive Era
- William Jennings Bryan

== Works cited ==
- Auchincloss, Louis (2000). Woodrow Wilson. Viking. ISBN 978-0-670-88904-4.
- Berg, A. Scott (2013). Wilson. Simon & Schuster. ISBN 978-0-7432-0675-4.
- Bimes, Terry; Skowronek, Stephen (1996). "Woodrow Wilson's Critique of Popular Leadership: Reassessing the Modern-Traditional Divide in Presidential History". Polity. 29 (1): 27–63. doi:10.2307/3235274. JSTOR 3235274. S2CID 147062744.
- Blum, John (1956). Woodrow Wilson and the Politics of Morality. Little, Brown. ISBN 978-0-316-10021-2.
- Bragdon, Henry W. (1967). Woodrow Wilson: the Academic Years. Belknap Press. ISBN 978-0-674-73395-4.
- Brands, H. W. (2003). Woodrow Wilson. Times Books. ISBN 978-0-8050-6955-6.
- Clements, Kendrick A. (1992). The Presidency of Woodrow Wilson. University Press of Kansas. ISBN 978-0-7006-0523-1.
- Cooper, John Milton Jr., ed. (2008). Reconsidering Woodrow Wilson: Progressivism, Internationalism, War, and Peace. Woodrow Wilson Center Press. ISBN 978-0-8018-9074-1.
- Cooper, John Milton Jr. (1983), The Warrior and the Priest: Woodrow Wilson and Theodore Roosevelt, Belknap Press, ISBN 978-0-674-94750-4
- Cooper, John Milton Jr. (2009). Woodrow Wilson. Knopf Doubleday Publishing Group. ISBN 9780307273017.
- Hankins, Barry (2016). Woodrow Wilson: Ruling Elder, Spiritual President. Oxford University Press. ISBN 978-0-19-102818-2.
- Heckscher, August, ed. (1956). The Politics of Woodrow Wilson: Selections from his Speeches and Writings. Harper. OCLC 564752499.
- Heckscher, August (1991). Woodrow Wilson. Easton Press. ISBN 978-0-684-19312-0.
- Kennedy, Ross A., ed. (2013). A Companion to Woodrow Wilson. John Wiley & Sons. ISBN 978-1-118-44540-2.
- Levin, Phyllis Lee (2001). Edith and Woodrow: The Wilson White House. Scribner. ISBN 978-0-7432-1158-1. - Wikipedia article on book: Edith and Woodrow
- Link, Arthur Stanley (1947–1965), Wilson, vol. 5 volumes, Princeton University Press, OCLC 3660132
  - Link, Arthur Stanley (1947). Wilson: The Road to the White House. Princeton University Press.
  - Link, Arthur Stanley (1956). Wilson: The New Freedom. Princeton University Press.
- Link, Arthur Stanley (2002). "Woodrow Wilson". In Graff, Henry F. (ed.). The Presidents: A Reference History. Scribner. pp. 365–388. ISBN 978-0-684-31226-2.
- Mulder, John H. (1978). Woodrow Wilson: The Years of Preparation. Princeton University Press. ISBN 978-0-691-04647-1.
- O'Toole, Patricia (2018). The Moralist: Woodrow Wilson and the World He Made. Simon & Schuster. ISBN 978-0-7432-9809-4.
- Pestritto, Ronald J. (2005). Woodrow Wilson and the Roots of Modern Liberalism. Rowman & Littlefield. ISBN 978-0-7425-1517-8.
- Ruiz, George W. (1989). "The Ideological Convergence of Theodore Roosevelt and Woodrow Wilson". Presidential Studies Quarterly. 19 (1): 159–177. JSTOR 40574572.
- Saunders, Robert M. (1998). In Search of Woodrow Wilson: Beliefs and Behavior. Greenwood Press. ISBN 978-0-313-30520-7.
- Stokes, Melvyn (2007). D. W. Griffith's The Birth of a Nation: A History of "The Most Controversial Motion Picture of All Time". Oxford University Press. ISBN 978-0-19-533679-5.
- Walworth, Arthur (1958). Woodrow Wilson, Volume I, Volume II. Longmans, Green. OCLC 1031728326.
- Weisman, Steven R. (2002). The Great Tax Wars: Lincoln to Wilson – The Fierce Battles over Money That Transformed the Nation. Simon & Schuster. ISBN 978-0-684-85068-9.
- White, William Allen (2007) [1925]. Woodrow Wilson – The Man, His Times and His Task. Read Books. ISBN 978-1-4067-7685-0.
- Wilson, Woodrow (1885). Congressional Government, A Study in American Politics. Houghton, Mifflin and Company. OCLC 504641398 – via Internet Archive.
