= George Washington Buckner =

American diplomat

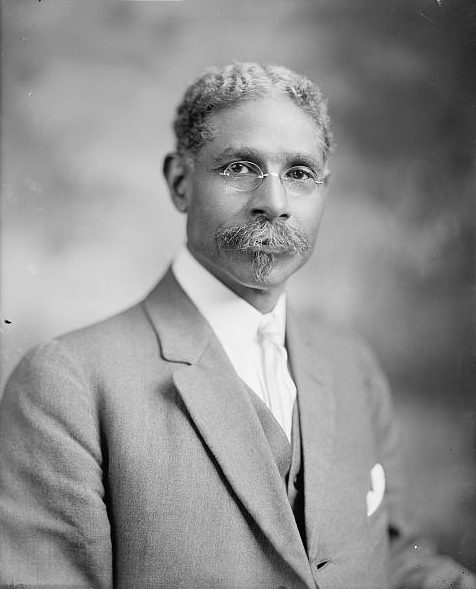
- Dr. George Washington Buckner
- Born: December 1, 1855; Greensburg, Kentucky, U.S.
- Died: February 17, 1943 (aged 87); Evansville, Indiana, U.S.
- Education: Indiana State Normal School; Indiana Eclectic Medical College
- Occupations: physician and diplomat
- Political party: Democratic
- Spouses: Stella White; Anna Cowen

George Washington Buckner (December 1, 1855 – February 17, 1943) was an American physician and diplomat. He was United States Minister to Liberia from 1913 to 1915.

== Life ==
Born into enslavement near Greensburg, Kentucky, Buckner was freed at the age of ten. He attended a Freedman's School in Greensburg, where he received a basic education. In 1870, he moved to live with his aunt in Louisville, and worked there briefly as a household servant before moving back to Green County in 1871 to be a teacher. Buckner later moved to Indiana, where he was educated as a teacher at Indiana State Normal School in Terre Haute, and as a doctor at the Indiana Eclectic Medical College.

After graduating from normal school, Buckner taught in Vincennes, Washington and Evansville. He married Stella White in Vincennes in 1879. She died of tuberculosis in 1889. Buckner graduated from medical school in 1890 and practiced medicine in Indianapolis for a year before moving to Evansville, where he opened a doctor's office. He married Anna Cowen there in 1896. The couple had five children. John W. Boehne, a prominent Evansville Democrat, brought Buckner to the attention of President Woodrow Wilson, who appointed him Minister Resident to Liberia in 1913. Buckner served in the post until 1915, during which time he also served as American Consul General in Monrovia, the capital of Liberia. He frequently became ill with fever because of the tropical climate and he resigned himself to returning to Evansville.

Buckner belonged to the African Methodist Episcopal Church and was active in Evansville civic affairs. He helped establish the Cherry Street Black YMCA and the United Brotherhood of Friendship. An active member of the Democratic Party, he was often involved with his close friend, Congressman John W. Boehne. He regularly wrote the "Colored Folks" section of region's Democratic newsletter, urging them to support the party, earning himself the nickname "Elder Statesman of Indiana Blacks".

Buckner died in 1943 at the age of 87 in Evansville, where he was buried in Oak Hill Cemetery.

== Legacy ==
His son, Zach Buckner, donated much of his father's memorabilia to the Evansville Museum, where it is on display in an exhibit.

- A housing project in Evansville, George W. Buckner Towers, is named for him.

== Notes and references ==
Government offices
Preceded by William D. Crum	United States Minister to Liberia; September 10, 1913 – April 15, 1915	Succeeded by James L. Curtis
