= Nellie Ramsey Leslie =

American teacher and composer

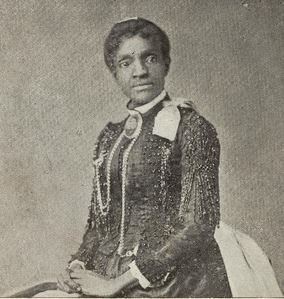
- Born: Nellie A. Coles c. 1840s Amelia County, Virginia
- Died: c. 1920s Muskogee, Oklahoma
- Other names: Nellie A. Ramsey, N.A.R. Leslie
- Occupations: Teacher, music instructor
- Years active: 1865-1899

Nellie A. Ramsey Leslie (better known as N.A.R. Leslie; née Coles; c. 1840s-c. 1920s) was notable as a teacher, musician and composer, working in Louisiana and Mississippi, and then in Indian Territory and Corpus Christi, Texas, where she founded a musical conservatory for girls. Born into slavery in Virginia, after emancipation she gained schooling in Ohio and moved to Louisiana to teach for the Freedmen's Bureau. She attended the Normal School of Straight University and gained further training as a teacher. Teaching in Louisiana, Mississippi, Indian Territory, and Texas, Leslie educated freedmen and their children.

== Early life ==
Nellie A. Ramsey (Note: It is unknown whether her name was Ramsey or Coles at birth. DeBoer states that her maiden name was Ramsey, but the source misidentifies her brother Solomon as Samuel.) was born into slavery in Virginia. Very little is known of her early life. Scruggs says she was born in Amelia County, Virginia and DeBoer says she was born in Petersburg, Virginia. She was the fourth daughter of Nannie and Charles P. Coles and had one brother, Solomon Melvin Coles (1844-1929/1930). After emancipation, Ramsey went north and gained some education in Ohio. She started to work as a young woman for the Freedmen's Bureau in 1865, going to Louisiana soon after the end of the war.

Despite laws forbidding education of blacks, Solomon Coles had learned to read at age 14. He was first trained as a coachman for his master's wife. When the Civil War ended, Solomon took night courses at the Freedmen's Bureau in Norfolk, Virginia before migrating north to further his schooling. He attended Lincoln University in Pennsylvania. After graduating, he became the first person of African descent to be admitted to the Yale Divinity School. Although he did not graduate, he was accepted as a minister in the Congregational Church. He became a missionary for the American Missionary Association, which planted black churches in the South and also sponsored teachers for freedmen. Starting in the 1870s, he was the third Congregational minister called to the black church in Corpus Christi, Texas. He also taught freedmen's children here in the Negro school. In the late 1870s, he became the first black principal of the school. About 1895 he moved to a school in San Antonio, where he taught until he reached retirement.

== Career ==
Ramsey started to work for the Freedmen's Bureau in 1865. She first taught elementary school in New Orleans. In time, her salary was paid through a shared funding agreement between the first public school board of the city and the American Missionary Association (AMA), which helped support numerous teachers in the South as part of their educational mission for freedmen and their children. For the 1870–1871 term, she studied at the Normal School of the newly established Straight University, founded by the AMA. The following year, she began teaching primary school at Straight, which had a range of preparatory classes, and then in Amite City, Louisiana. She was highly regarded for her work and in 1872, received a glowing testimonial from a Catholic priest.

Ramsey taught in Amite City until 1874. That year she married Rev. R. A. Leslie, a Presbyterian minister, and moved to a school in Osyka, Mississippi. Rev. Leslie was a Creek Indian. Around 1880 he and his wife moved to Indian Territory, where he helped establish schools for Creek Freedmen. Establishing a boarding house the following year in Muskogee, the couple remained in Indian Territory for several years. They returned to Mississippi, where Rev. Leslie died in April 1884.

After her husband's death, Leslie studied at the Boston Conservatory of Music. She moved to Paris, Texas, where she founded and led a music school. It was flourishing by 1886. The following year, she returned to Muskogee, Indian Territory, where she taught in a private girls academy. Her school charged a tuition of eight dollars per month. Leslie also founded the Afro-American International Institute and School of Arts. In the summer of 1891 she was hired as principal of the Tullahassee Mission School, which was a school for Creek Freedmen. Leslie already had vacation plans for time in Saratoga Springs, New York, a summer resort town in upstate. Leslie served as principal until October 1891.

Her brother Solomon Cole had married late in life and become widowed. He and his wife had two daughters, but one died in infancy. Leslie moved to Corpus Christi, Texas to help him raise his remaining daughter. There she opened a music conservatory for girls. Known throughout the region for her teaching skill, Leslie also performed music and was considered a "composer of some prominence". None of her works is known to be extant. After working for several years in Texas, Leslie returned to Indian Territory.

She resumed teaching at the Tallahassee Mission in 1895, where she served as the music director for at least three years. In 1920, she was still living in Muskogee, now in the state of Oklahoma, which was admitted to the union in 1908. In 1921, Leslie performed at a Baptist gathering in Bristow, Oklahoma. (Note: Though the clipping from The Tulsa Star states Leslie is nearly 100, the age seems improbable, as does her age of 65 that is recorded on the 1920 census. Her brother was born in 1844, and she began her career in 1865 after some schooling, so may have been in her early 20s. If the birth year of 1855 given on the census was correct, she would have been only ten years old after completing her schooling and going to work at the Freedmen's Bureau. If the birth year indicated by the Star, 1821, is correct, she would have been 72 when the photograph published by Scruggs in 1893 was taken. It seems more likely that Leslie was born in the 1840s, as was her brother.)
