= Abbie J. Wright =

American opera singer

Abbie J. Wright (1862–?) was an African American opera singer.

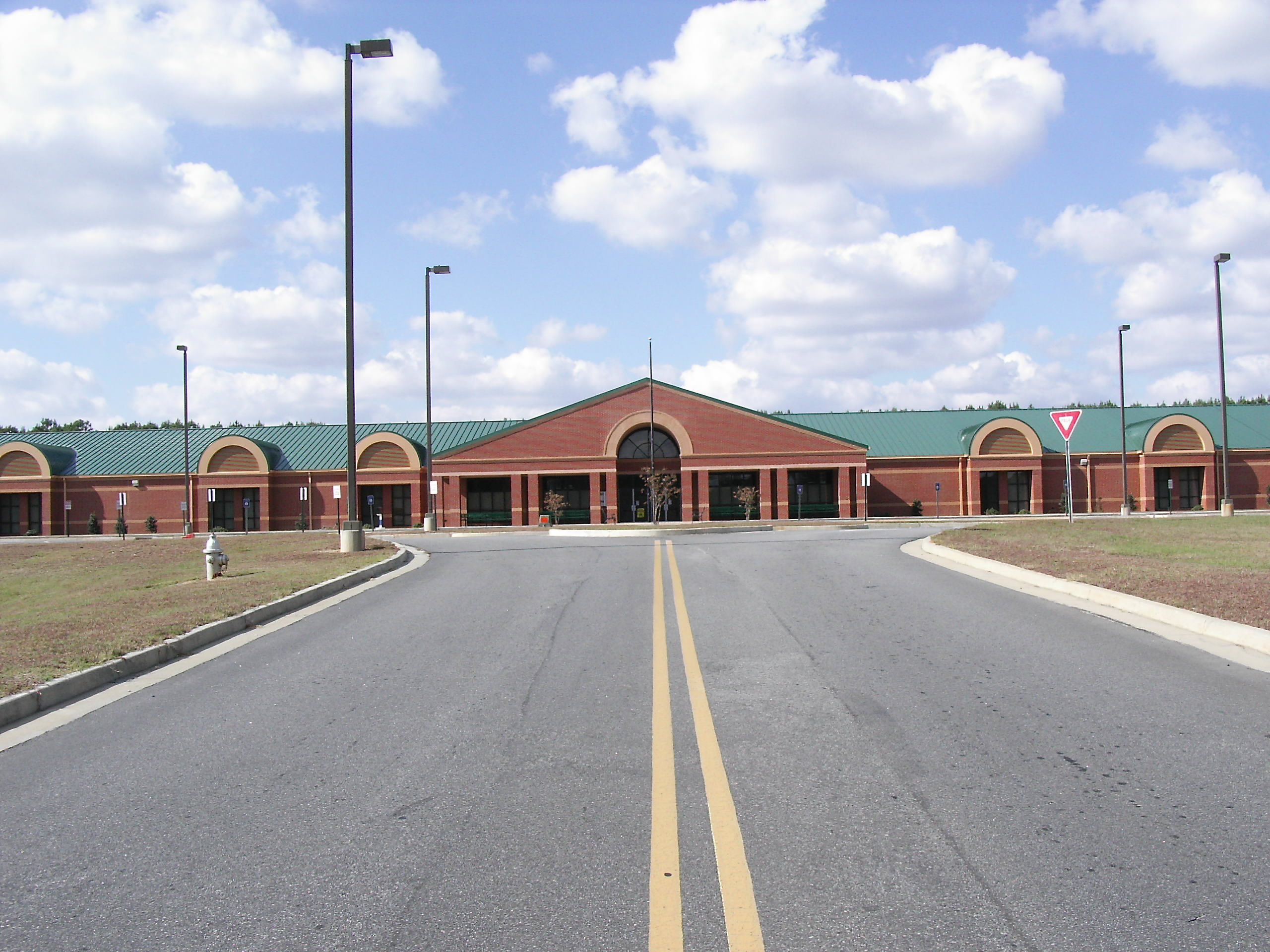
Annie Belle Clark School

== Biography ==
Wright was born in Stony Brook, New York, in 1862. She is listed in the 1870 federal census along with what may be her grandparents (aged 50 and 55), Jacob and Amelia Wright. All three are listed as having the occupation “white washer.” By 1880 the three are listed again (possibly at the same Harlem address), this time with Amelia's occupation as “dress maker” and Abbie's as “music teacher.”

Abbie married Ernst Lyon (1860–1938) in 1883. At least two records list a second marriage for Ernest Lyon in 1893 to Clara Florida Bacchus but the 1900 census lists Abbie and Ernest still together with three children, Maud Amelia, Annie Belle, and Ernest Harrison Monroe. Abbie did not list an occupation for 1900. Delaware marriage records show Lyon's marriage to 25-year-old Bacchus was in 1903.

Ernest Lyon had been born in Belize, British Honduras and immigrated to the U.S. in 1874. Abbie witnessed his naturalization as a citizen on October 9, 1894. Booker T. Washington recommended Lyon to President Theodore Roosevelt, who appointed him U.S. Minister and Consul General to Liberia in 1903, in which capacity he served until 1910. He was an auxiliary member of the Republican National Committee.

On Monday, October 12, 1896 at 8 PM, in the Main Hall at Carnegie Hall in New York City, Abbie performed Pasquale Mililoti's opera piece “The Knight” as part of a Zion Grand Centennial Jubilee, Concert, and Banquet. New York City Mayor William Lafayette Strong and Booker T. Washington were among the speakers.

By 1902, Abbie was teaching singing at the Y.W.C.A in Baltimore.

A 1907 New Jersey marriage index lists a union between Abbie Wright and John A. Crowell (16 years her junior), an accomplished baritone. Several advertisements in these years in the Baltimore Afro American Ledger list a concerts by “Madame Abbie W. Crowell (formerly Madam Lyon),” accompanied by Crowell. The 1910 federal census found the Crowells living in Essex, NJ, where Abbie taught private students and John worked in insurance. In that census, Abbie indicated having given birth to seven children, of whom only three survived.

In 1912 Abbie was performing at churches with Mrs. Julia Mason Layton and Mrs. H.B. Harris, billing themselves as “The Flying Squadron.” An ad invited people to “Come and hear them sing and talk for the Progressive Party.” Layton (1858–1925) was described as, “Writer, lecturer, activist, president of Washington D.C.’s Phyllis Wheatley YWCA, and member of the Colored Women's Republican League.

The May 17, 1913 edition of the African American Cleveland Gazette noted Abbie's arrival at the Hotel Dale in Cape May, NJ. John was not with her and the paper wrote her name as “Miss Abbie Wright Crowell of Philadelphia.”
