= Marvalene Hughes =

American educator (1937–2026)

- Born: 1937
- Died: January 3, 2026 (aged 88); Tuskegee, Alabama, U.S.
- Occupations: Educator, administrator

Marvalene Hughes (1937 – January 3, 2026) was an American educator, administrator and writer. She served as the president of Dillard University from 2005 to 2011. From 1994 to 2005, she was the president of California State University, Stanislaus where she also was a professor in the psychology department.

== Life and career ==
Hughes earned a PhD in counseling and administration from Florida State University. Her MS, in counselling and administration, and her BS in English and history, were both from Tuskegee University. She also received an Honorary Doctorate from Brown University.

She held positions at Florida A&M University, Eckerd College, and San Diego State University. Hughes was associate vice president for student affairs at Arizona State University and vice president of student affairs at the University of Toledo. At the University of Minnesota, Twin Cities, she served as vice provost for academic affairs and vice president for student affairs.

According to an article in Ebony, Hughes had a husband and three children.

A resident of Tuskegee, Alabama, Hughes died on January 3, 2026, at the age of 88.
