= Fannie C. Williams =

American teacher (1882–1980)

- Born: March 23, 1882; Biloxi, Mississippi, U.S.
- Died: June 12, 1980 (age 98); New Orleans, Louisiana, U.S.
- Occupation: Educator

Fannie C. Williams (March 23, 1882 – June 12, 1980) was an American educator based in New Orleans. She was elected president of the National Association of Teachers in Colored Schools in 1930.

== Early life ==
Fannie C. Williams was born in 1882 in Biloxi, Mississippi. In 1904, she graduated from Straight College, a school that later merged with Dillard University. In 1920, she received two degrees from Michigan State College, a Bachelor of Arts and a bachelor of pedagogy. She earned a master's degree from the University of Michigan in 1938.

== Career ==
After college, Williams taught in Gulfport and Pass Christian, Mississippi, from 1904 to 1908. She taught at Fisk Elementary in Albion, Michigan from 1908 to 1917. When she returned to New Orleans in 1921, Williams taught initially at the Valena C. Jones School, an elementary school, and later at the Valena C. Jones Normal School; both of which shared a campus. She served as principal of both schools. One of her students was Andrew Young, who recalled her fondly for bringing celebrities to speak at the school, including Marian Anderson and Joe Louis. She retired from school work in 1954.

In New Orleans, she served as an organizer, charter member, and President for the Board of Management for the African-American branch of the New Orleans YWCA. She started a health program which resulted in the creation of Child Health Day, observed in New Orleans schools on May 1. Williams served on the board of directors of Dillard University and Flint-Goodridge Hospital. She held a position on many organizations including the boards of the Orleans Neighborhood Center, the Family Service Society, the Girl Scouts, and the Department of Public Welfare. In 1974 she was presented with a certificate of appreciation by the Community Chest of New Orleans, and honored at a banquet by the New Orleans Retired Teachers Association.

Williams participated in three White House Conferences during the administrations of Herbert Hoover, Franklin Roosevelt, and Harry Truman. She was elected president of the National Association of Teachers in Colored Schools in 1930, succeeding Mordecai Wyatt Johnson. She taught at summer institutes at historically Black colleges and universities including Tuskegee University, Southern University, Alabama State College, West Virginia State College, and Alcorn State University. She was a regional leader of the National Council of Negro Women. In 1939, columnist Elizabeth Galbreath of The Chicago Defender called Williams "the woman they ought to hire to keep the world out of war—she knows so well what to do all of the time, and how and why to do it."

== Death and legacy ==
Williams was a member of Alpha Kappa Alpha sorority. Williams died in 1980 at the age of 98, in New Orleans. Fannie C. Williams Hall, a dormitory at Dillard University, was named for her in 1946, and Fannie C. Williams Charter School was named in her memory in the 2010s. Her papers are at the Amistad Research Center.
