= Henry Bragdon =

American teacher and historian

Henry Bragdon (1906 – 1980) was an American historian and high school history teacher. He authored the American history textbook History of a Free People in 1954 (with Samuel McCutchen) which was widely used throughout high schools in the United States for over 25 years. His biography of Woodrow Wilson's early life and academic career at Princeton University was a finalist for the National Book Award in 1968.

== Biography ==
Bragdon was born in Rochester, New York on 6 September 1906. His father Claude was an architect and draftsman. His mother Charlotte Wilkinson Bragdon was employed by the Henry Street Settlement providing social services in New York City. She later became the national secretary and president of the National League of Women Workers.

Bragdon graduated high school from the Kent School in Connecticut; he then obtained a degree in history from Harvard University. He was a member of the rowing team at Harvard. He then obtained a Master's degree from Trinity College, Cambridge through a Fiske scholarship.

Bragdon was a high school history teacher at the Brooks School, a high school and college preparatory school in North Andover, Massachusetts. He also coached ice hockey and football at the Brooks School. In 1945, Bragdon became a history teacher at the Phillips Exeter Academy where he taught until his retirement in 1974. As an educator, Bragdon was noted for his optimistic outlook and inspiring a love of learning and academic excellence in his students.

Bragdon's mentors included his father Claude and his schoolmaster at the Kent School Frederick Herbert Sill.

He authored a 1954 textbook about US History entitled History of a Free People. The book, published by Macmillan and co-authored with Samuel McCutchen, was widely used throughout the United States in high schools. It was published in numerous editions until 1981. The textbook was rejected by the Texas Board of Education presumably for being critical of some in the United States senate for refusing to join the League of Nations and support the Treaty of Versailles. The textbook also controversially referred to the American Civil War as the "War between the States" after protests from Southern states. A review of the textbook in History of Education Quarterly commended Bragdon and McCutchen for explaining historical events in the young America as occurring amongst a setting of broad cultural forces (such forces as the American peoples' yearning for political participation and economic growth). The textbook was also commended for having educational activities at the end of each chapter that reinforced students' learning as well as open ended questions that encouraged discussions.

His 1968 biography of Woodrow Wilson focused on the future president's early life and his academic career at Princeton University (prior to entering politics in 1910). The book was well received by commentators. Writing in The New England Quarterly, Arthur S. Link noted that Bragdon's analysis of Wilson's noted book of political analysis Congressional Government, is "one of the best that has ever been written". Frederick Allis Jr. noted in the Proceedings of the Massachusetts Historical Society that the biography was one of the most complete works regarding Wilson's academic career.

Bragdon was a member of the Massachusetts Historical Society. He died of a heart attack in 1980, aged 73.
