= National Liberian Women's Social and Political Movement =

The National Liberian Women's Social and Political Movement (NLWSPM) was a Liberian women's organization founded in 1920 by Maude A. Morris. It had local branches among four tribal groups, such as Bassa Tribal Women and Grebo Tribal Women. The NLWSPM tried to press for women's involvement in Liberian government. However, President Charles D. B. King opposed this, on the grounds that it amounted to the "Americanizing" of Liberian women.
