= James W. Ames =

American politician (1864–1944)

- Born: October 12, 1864
- Died: January 31, 1944 (aged 79)
- Occupations: Physician, politician

James W. Ames (October 12, 1864 in New Orleans, Louisiana – January 31, 1944 in Detroit, Michigan) was an American physician.

Ames was educated at Straight University (later merged into Dillard University) in New Orleans, and then received a degree from Howard University. He had taught school in New Orleans as well.

Ames moved to Detroit in 1894. In the mid-1890s Ames was elected as a Republican to the Michigan House of Representatives with the endorsement of Hazen Pingree. In 1918, he led a group of 30 African-American physicians who founded Dunbar Hospital in Detroit. This hospital was organized because no other hospital in the city would admit African-Americans at that time. The hospital was named in honor of Paul Laurence Dunbar who had written poetry in favor of Pingree (and thus indirectly in favor of Ames) back in the 1890s. He served as a trustee of the Phillis Wheatley Home for Aged Colored Ladies. His wife served as treasurer for this institution. He also served as an inspector for the Board of Health of Detroit.

== Sources ==
- Vine, Phyllis (2005). One Man's Castle: Clarence Darrow in Defense of the American Dream. New York: Amistad. p. 298. ISBN 978-0-06-093827-7. "James W. Ames."
- Vivian M. Baulch (November 28, 1995). "How Detroit got its first black hospital". The Detroit News.
