= Maude A. Morris =

Liberian activist

Maude Amelia Morris, née Lyon (died 1961) was a Liberian women's rights activist and rubber farmer.

== Life ==
Maude Lyon was the daughter of the US Resident Minister to Liberia, Ernest Lyon. In 1907 she married John Lewis Morris (1882-1935), who later served as Liberian Secretary of State under Daniel E. Howard in the 1920s.

In 1920 she founded the National Liberian Women Social and Political Movement (NLWSPM), to press for women's involvement in the Liberian government. However, President Charles D. B. King opposed the organization on the grounds that it amounted to the "Americanizing" of Liberian women. In 1932 Morris apparently tried again to organize women, heading a group which petitioned the national legislature to amend the constitution and establish female suffrage. "This was likewise treated with laughter and contempt".

In 1924 Morris bought some young rubber trees from the Firestone plantation at Harbel. After they were successfully planted at the family homestead near Monrovia, a family rubber farm soon started to expand. After her husband died in 1935, her eldest son Harry L. Morris returned to Liberia to help carry on the farm. By 1954 the family had moved to live near Kakata. The farm consisted of almost 3,000 acres, and rubber sales grossed over $100,000 per year.

In 1945 Morris was among Liberia's delegation to the San Francisco Conference which established the United Nations.

British administrative reports painted a vivid picture of Morris in the late 1940s:

One of the most picturesque figures in Liberia, and, in spite of her age and enormous bulk, still a powerful factor in the public life of the country [...] she has brought up, single-handed, a family of four children and developed a derelict farm near Monrovia, left her by her late husband, into a prosperous rubber and fruit plantation. She is to be found on nearly all Government, Red Cross and social welfare committees; and her voice, raised consistently in the interest of justice and fair play, is a terror to Government officials and politicians who have been found wanting. She is always welcome in white people's homes as much as in those of her own race, and in this way acts as a sort of link between the two peoples. She is truly a venerable and honourable Liberian institution.

She died in her seventies in 1961.
