= Louis A. Martinet =

American politician

Louis André Martinet (December 28, 1849 - June 7, 1917) was a lawyer, publisher, medical doctor, civil rights activist and state legislator in Louisiana during the Reconstruction era.

== Biography ==
He was born December 28, 1849, in St. Martinville, Louisiana, to Hipolite Martinet and Marie Louise Benoit.

He was a prominent member of the Comité des Citoyens, a civil society group whose most famous action was staging the arrest and subsequent defense of Homer Plessy in an effort to oppose racial segregation resulting in the Supreme Court decision Plessy vs Ferguson.

He served as a state representative in the Louisiana House of Representatives from St. Martin Parish from 1872 until 1875. He was admitted to the bar in Louisiana in December 1875 and obtained his first class law degree from Straight University Law School the following year in 1876. He was a notary and set up his notarial practice in 1888 which continued to operate until his death.

In February 1879 he was appointed to the City Board of School Directors, re-filling the position he had vacated the previous year in May 1878. In 1882 he was made the Special Deputy Surveyor for the Port in New Orleans.

He published The New Orleans Crusader (1889–1896) newspaper and was active opposing segregation. In the 1890s he obtained a medical degree from the Flint Medical College in New Orleans.

He survived an attempted assassination May 5, 1896 when he was accosted by a drunk Matthew J. Ryan who placed his revolver in Mr Martinets stomach. Bystanders saved Martinet by overpowering Ryan and handing him over to the police.

== Personal life ==
In 1882, he married Miss Leonora V. Miller and later they had two children, although one died while still an infant.

== Legacy ==
He died in 1917. The Louis A. Martinet Legal Society is named for him. In 1984 the Louis Martinet Society organized efforts to elect more Black judges in New Orleans.
