= Joyce M. Roche =

American nonprofit executive

- Born: March 16, 1947 (age 79); Iberville Parish, Louisiana
- Education: Dillard University, Columbia University
- Occupations: Former President and Chief Executive Officer of Girls Incorporated
- Board member of: Macy's Inc., Tupperware Corporation
- Website: Biography at Girls Incorporated

Joyce M. Roché is the former president and chief executive officer of Girls Incorporated.

== Biography ==
Roché is a graduate of Dillard University in New Orleans and holds an MBA from Columbia University. She also has honorary doctorate degrees from Dillard University, where she chaired the board of trustees, North Adams State College, Bryant University, Mercy College, and Old Dominion University.

Roché served as a director of Southern New England Telecommunications from 1997 until the company was acquired by AT&T Inc. in 1998, where she continued her role as director. She is a director of Federated Department Stores, Macy's Inc., and Tupperware Corporation. She has previously served as a director of Anheuser-Busch Companies, Inc. and the National Underground Railroad Freedom Center.

From 2011 to 2017, Roché served as the director of Dr Pepper Snapple Group, Inc.

Roché retired from the AT&T Inc. board in 2018.

== Books ==
Roché released The Empress Has No Clothes: Conquering Self-Doubt to Embrace Success in 2013 (Berrett-Kholer Publishers). The book is a guide to understanding and overcoming impostor syndrome.

== See also ==
- List of chief executive officers
