= Ernest A. Lyon =

American diplomat (1860–1938)

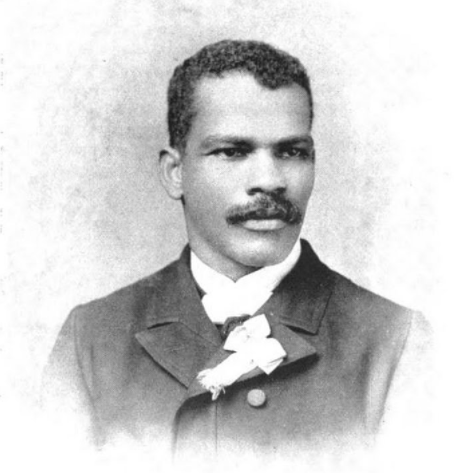

United States Ambassador to Liberia
- In office March 16, 1903 – August 25, 1910
- President: Theodore Roosevelt; William Howard Taft
- Preceded by: John R. A. Crossland
- Succeeded by: William D. Crum

Founder of Maryland Industrial and Agricultural Institute for Colored Youths
- In office 1901–1902

Personal details
- Born: October 22, 1860 Belize City, British Honduras
- Died: July 17, 1938 (aged 77) Johns Hopkins Hospital, Baltimore, Maryland, U.S.
- Cause of death: Lobar pneumonia
- Party: Republican
- Children: 3, including Maude A. Morris
- Education: New Orleans University (BA); Union Theological Seminary (AM); Wiley College (DD); University of Liberia (LLD)

Ernest A. Lyon (October 22, 1860 – July 17, 1938) (Note: Some sources state that Lyon was born September 22, 1860.) was an Belize-born African-American minister, educator and diplomat.

== Early life and education ==
Lyon was born on October 22, 1860, in on the coast of Belize, British Honduras to Emmanuel Lyon and Ann F. Bending. (Note: There are a few accounts that Lyon was born in Honduras but most state British Honduras.) As a child, Lyon attended an English school in Belize. His father died when he was young. Lyon "became a Christian by experience October 24, 1875."

Lyon immigrated to the United States in mid 1870s to increase his education opportunities. For three years he attended the Gilbert Industrial Institute in La Teche, Louisiana. In 1880, Lyon attended Straight University. From 1881 to 1883, he attended the Gilbert Seminary while serving as the pastor of the Methodist Episcopal Church, Baldwin, later called Winston. It was here that he met his first wife, Abbie J. Wright who reluctantly married Lyon in a wedding officiated by Rev. W.D. Godman, the president of Gilbert Seminary.

Lyon graduated with A.B. degree in the classics from New Orleans University in 1888. (Note: In 1934, New Orleans University merged with Straight College to form Dillard University.) He later earned an A.M. degree in theology from Union Theological Seminary. Lyon has a D.D. degree from Wiley College and a L.L.D from University of Liberia.

== Career ==
=== 1882–1900: Career beginnings ===
Lyon joined the Louisiana Conference of the Methodist Episcopal Church in 1882. The next year, in 1883, Lyon became the first charge in La Teche. In 1894, he "was appointed Sunday School Agent of the Louisiana Conference." He also served as the Conference statistical secretary and the reserve delegate of the General conference for several years. He was an editor of the Sunday school column in the Southwestern Christian Advocate. By 1895, Lyon was the "special agent of the Freedman's Aid and Southern Educational Society." Later he served as a pastor in multiple churches in New Orleans including the Mallalieu Methodist Episcopal Church in 1886, the Thompson Church in 1889, and the Simpson Church in 1891. In 1896, he was the pastor of St. Mark's Church in New York City. Lyon was a member of the New York City Missionary and Church Extension Society. While pastor of St. Mark's Church, Lyon was the only African American among 300 members of the New York Conference.

As an ardent Republican, Lyon was appointed as an auxiliary member of the Republican National Committee in 1884. In this role, all matters about the "colored vote" in the Eastern United States were referred to him. In 1890, Lyon was appointed by the RNC as a member of the advisory board.

=== 1901–1902: Foundation of Maryland school for colored youths and Morgan College ===
In 1901, Lyon was the pastor of the John Wesley Methodist Episcopal Church in Baltimore, Maryland. That same year he worked as the professor of church history at Morgan College. He was among the founders of the Maryland Industrial and Agricultural Institute for Colored Youths, a school for African-American youth in North Laurel, Maryland. He later served as the first president of the school.

=== 1903–1910: Politics and U.S. Ambassador to Liberia ===
Lyon and his son, Ernest Harrison Monroe in Monrovia, Liberia, circa 1905

The civil rights leader Booker T. Washington recommended Lyon to President Theodore Roosevelt, who appointed him U.S. Minister and Consul General to Liberia in 1903. He served in this capacity until 1910. Following his diplomatic service, he returned to Baltimore to become the minister of Ames Methodist Episcopal Church.

=== 1911–death: Liberian Consul General to the United States ===
In 1911, Lyon was appointed Liberian Consul General to the United States. He remained in this position until his death in 1938. During his tenure, Liberia paid off its World War I debt to the United States.

Lyon was "member committee" for the Negro Historical and Industrial Association which "invited President Woodrow Wilson to deliver address on opening day of 50th anniversary exposition and celebration of emancipation at Fort Lee, Virginia." Lyons was one of ten people to represent the intellectual contributions of African Americans in an international lecture course hosted by the Maryland State Department of Education in Baltimore.

In 1915, his office was located at 141 West Hill Street, Baltimore, Maryland.

== Personal life ==
Lyon was first married to singer Abbie J. Wright in 1883. Together they had three children, Maud Amelia, Annie Belle, and Ernest Harrison Monroe. In 1903, Lyon married Clara Florida Bacchus (1878-?) of Wilmington, Delaware. He was married for a third time on March 28, 1912, to Marie Wright of Baltimore. In 1915, Lyon resided in Laurel, Maryland. He died of lobar pneumonia on July 17, 1938, at the Johns Hopkins Hospital.

== Works consulted ==
- William Davis Godman, A. H. Dexter Godman, Ines A. Godman. 1893. Gilbert Academy and Agricultural College, Winsted, Louisiana: Sketches and Incidents.
- William Edward Burghardt Du Bois. 1917. The Crisis, Volumes 15–18 (p. 29).
- Sir Harry Hamilton Johnston. 1910. The Negro in the New World.
- John William Leonard, Albert Nelson Marquis (eds). Who's Who in America, Volume 4.
- The Journal of Negro History.
- The National Cyclopaedia of American Biography, Volume 14. 1910.
- Accomplished: African American Women in Victorian America, 2014, BIG BYTE BOOKS
- 1900 United States Federal Census

== Footnotes ==
Diplomatic posts
| Preceded by John R. A. Crossland | United States Ambassador to Liberia; 1903–1910 | Succeeded by William D. Crum |
