= Kimberly S. Johnson =

American clinical investigator

- Born: Winstonville, Mississippi, USA

Academic background
- Education: BS, Dillard University; MD, 1997, Johns Hopkins University

Kimberly Sherell Johnson is an American clinical investigator. She is a Full professor of medicine at Duke University and director of Duke REACH Equity (Duke Center for Research to Advance Health Care Equity). In March 2020, Johnson's academic work was recognized with the first Richard Payne Outstanding Achievement in Diversity, Equity and Inclusion Award from the American Academy of Hospice and Palliative Medicine.

== Early life and education ==
Johnson was born and raised in Winstonville, Mississippi, a town outside of Mound Bayou, Mississippi. Upon graduating from high school. Johnson enrolled at Dillard University for her bachelor's degree. Her father was killed during the second semester of her freshman year at Dillard in 1990 and she returned home for one week. Following Dillard, Johnson enrolled at Johns Hopkins University for her medical degree and finished her internal medicine residency and geriatrics fellowship at Duke University. In 2000, she served as Duke's chief resident for Ambulatory/Community Hospital Medicine. While completing her post-degree work at Duke, Johnson became interested in research related to health disparities in hospice and palliative care. In 2007, she presented her research uncovering a number of factors among African Americans that contribute to end-of-life disparities to Duke's Department of Medicine Grand Rounds.

== Career ==
As an assistant professor of medicine at Duke University, Johnson continued to research health care inequalities amongst African Americans. In 2013, she was the recipient of the American Geriatrics Society's Outstanding Junior Clinical Education Manuscript Award for her article The Junior Faculty Laboratory: An Innovative Model of Peer Mentoring. In 2015, Johnson applied for a Centers of Excellence grant from the National Institute on Minority Health and Health Disparities to study race disparities. She soon became the director of Duke REACH Equity (Duke Center for Research to Advance Health Care Equity), a center to reduce racial and ethnic disparities in health by improving the quality of patient-centered care in the clinical encounter. In 2017, Johnson's project "Reducing Disparities in the Quality of Palliative Care for Older African Americans through Improved Advance Care Planning (EQUAL ACP)" received funding from the Patient-Centered Outcomes Research Institute (PCORI) to study the barriers and facilitators of advance-care planning for different racial groups.

In March 2020, Johnson's academic work was recognized with the first Richard Payne Outstanding Achievement in Diversity, Equity and Inclusion Award from the American Academy of Hospice and Palliative Medicine.
