= William Demosthenes Crum =

American doctor and diplomat (1859–1912)

William D. Crum

United States Minister to Liberia
- In office 1910–1912
- President: William Howard Taft
- Preceded by: Ernest Lyon
- Succeeded by: George Washington Buckner

Personal details
- Born: February 9, 1859 Charleston, South Carolina, U.S.
- Died: December 7, 1912 (aged 53) Charleston, South Carolina, U.S.
- Resting place: Charleston, South Carolina, U.S.
- Party: Republican
- Spouse: Ellen Craft Crum

William Demosthenes Crum, alternatively known as William Demos Crum, (February 9, 1859 – December 7, 1912) was an American physician and diplomat.

== Biography ==
Crum was born on February 9, 1859, in Charleston, South Carolina. He was born a free man of color, the youngest of seven children, between Darius Crum, a German American, and Charlotte C. Crum, a free woman of color. He grew up on his father's plantation which used forty-three slaves prior to the end of the Civil War. He would graduate valedictorian of his class from the Avery Normal Institute in 1875. He would receive a medical degree from Howard University in 1881 before returning to Charleston and working at the McClennan Hospital and Training School for Nurses. He would go on to marry Ellen Crum, the daughter of fugitive slave abolitionists William and Ellen Craft, who would later be a founder of the National Federation of Afro-American Women. His career as a physician would also take off, noted for his work in the field of diagnostics and his studying of tuberculosis.

As he worked in the hospital, Crum would become involved with politics, even serving as the chairman of the county Republican Party for more than two decades. He would make ties and friendships with several prominent African Americans such as Whitefield Mckinlay, Harry C. Smith, T. Thomas Fortune, and most notably Booker T. Washington. During this time he would gain substantial wealth. He also serve as a delegate to every Republican National Conference from 1884 to 1904. He supported Benjamin Harrison at the 1892 convention despite having been elected as a pro-James G. Blaine delegate.

Some tragedy did however befall his wife's family, as her parents suffered financial ruin in 1890 and were forced to move to Charleston to live with their daughter; her mother and father would live there until they died in 1897 and 1900, respectively. He would also make an attempt to run for postmaster of the city in 1892, but ultimately fail.

In December 1902, President Theodore Roosevelt nominated Crum, on McKinlay's recommendation, as collector of customs for the port of Charleston to symbolize 'a door of hope' for southern African Americans. His nomination faced severe local opposition and the U.S. Senate adjourned on March 4, 1903 without taking any action on Crum's nomination. Roosevelt gave Crum a temporary commission and submitted his appointment to the U.S. Senate. The U.S. Senate and Roosevelt repeated their actions multiple times between November 1903 and April 28, 1904. The U.S. Senate voted to approve Crum on January 6, 1905. Crum was the first African American to hold the position and held it until March 4, 1909.

The heavy opposition he faced had catapulted him onto the national stage. After Roosevelt left office, his successor, William Howard Taft, considered Crum's status in Charleston to be a political liability. Rather than re-appoint Crum as collector of customs, President Taft offered him instead the post of Minister to Liberia and Consul-General.

Crum accepted this compromise and went on to serve as the Minister Resident of the United States to Liberia from 1910 to 1912. During his tenure he would attempt to aid the country resolve boundary disputes and stabilize its economy, but ultimately had little impact on it. During his diplomatic service in Monrovia, Crum contracted blackwater fever, a form of Malaria and was forced to resign his post in on 17 September 1912 and return to the United States. Crum never recovered and died on December 7, 1912, in Charleston, South Carolina.

== Works cited ==
- Sherman, Richard (1973). The Republican Party and Black America From McKinley to Hoover 1896-1933. University of Virginia Press. ISBN 0813904676.
