= Maryland Industrial and Agricultural Institute for Colored Youths =

- North Laurel, Maryland; United States

Information
- Other name: Laurel Colored Agricultural and Industrial School
- Established: 1901
- Founder: Ernest Lyon
- Closed: unknown
- Principal: R.J. Pollard

The Maryland Industrial and Agricultural Institute for Colored Youths was a school originally located in North Laurel, Maryland, United States. It was founded in 1901 by Ernest Lyon for the education of African-American students in central Maryland.

== History ==
In 1901 Ernest Lyon, the pastor at John Wesley Church in Baltimore, Maryland and a professor at Morgan College, purchased 87 acres (35 ha) of land located near the city of Laurel, Maryland and the Patuxent River for the establishment of a school dedicated to the education of African-American students, and served as the institution's first president, with agriculturalist R.J. Pollard as principal. Lyon was inspired by Booker T. Washington's advocacy of industrial education for African American children, and Washington later wrote in support of the Maryland Industrial and Agricultural Institute and similar institutions to the Maryland State Commission of Education. Pollard described the aims of the mission of the institute's founders as "the establishment of a Hampton or Tuskegee in Maryland-in the Black Belt of Maryland-as we have styled it."

The school was also known as the "Laurel Colored Agricultural and Industrial School."

By 1913, the school was no longer located in Laurel. The school later merged with Bowie Normal School.

== Funding and curriculum ==
Although the Industrial and Agricultural Institute initially had difficulty securing adequate funding from the Maryland State Legislature to support its operation and relied largely on private funding, by 1909 it was one of a number of industrial schools for African-American youths that were commended by the Maryland State Commission of Education as a model of industrial education. All students received instruction in English, as well as in one of more of the following subject areas: "carpentry, mechanical drawing, farming, cookery, dressmaking, laundering and housekeeping." Students cultivated crops on the school's farmland which were used to feed school attendees and staff as well as livestock cared for by the students. The initial class consisted of eight students, who boarded on campus.
