= Kim Johnson =

Kim Johnson may refer to:

- Kim Johnson (1944–2024), contestant in the 2001–2002 American reality television show Survivor: Africa
- Kim "Howard" Johnson (born 1955), American author and actor
- Kim Johnson (politician) (born 1966), British Labour Party MP for Liverpool Riverside since 2019
- Kim Johnson (born 1972), American hammer thrower, 1996 All-American for the Syracuse Orange track and field team
- Kimmarie Johnson (Kim Marie Johnson, born 1976), American actress, model, businesswoman and beauty pageant titleholder
- Kim Johnson (singer), American back-up vocalist
- Kim Johnson, English model, personal trainer and recurring cast member on Ladies of London season 3

== See also ==
- Kimberly Johnson (disambiguation)
- Kym Herjavec (née Johnson, born 1976), Australian ballroom dancer
- Kim Johnsson (born 1976), Swedish ice hockey player
