= Dunbar Hospital =

- Allied Medical Society
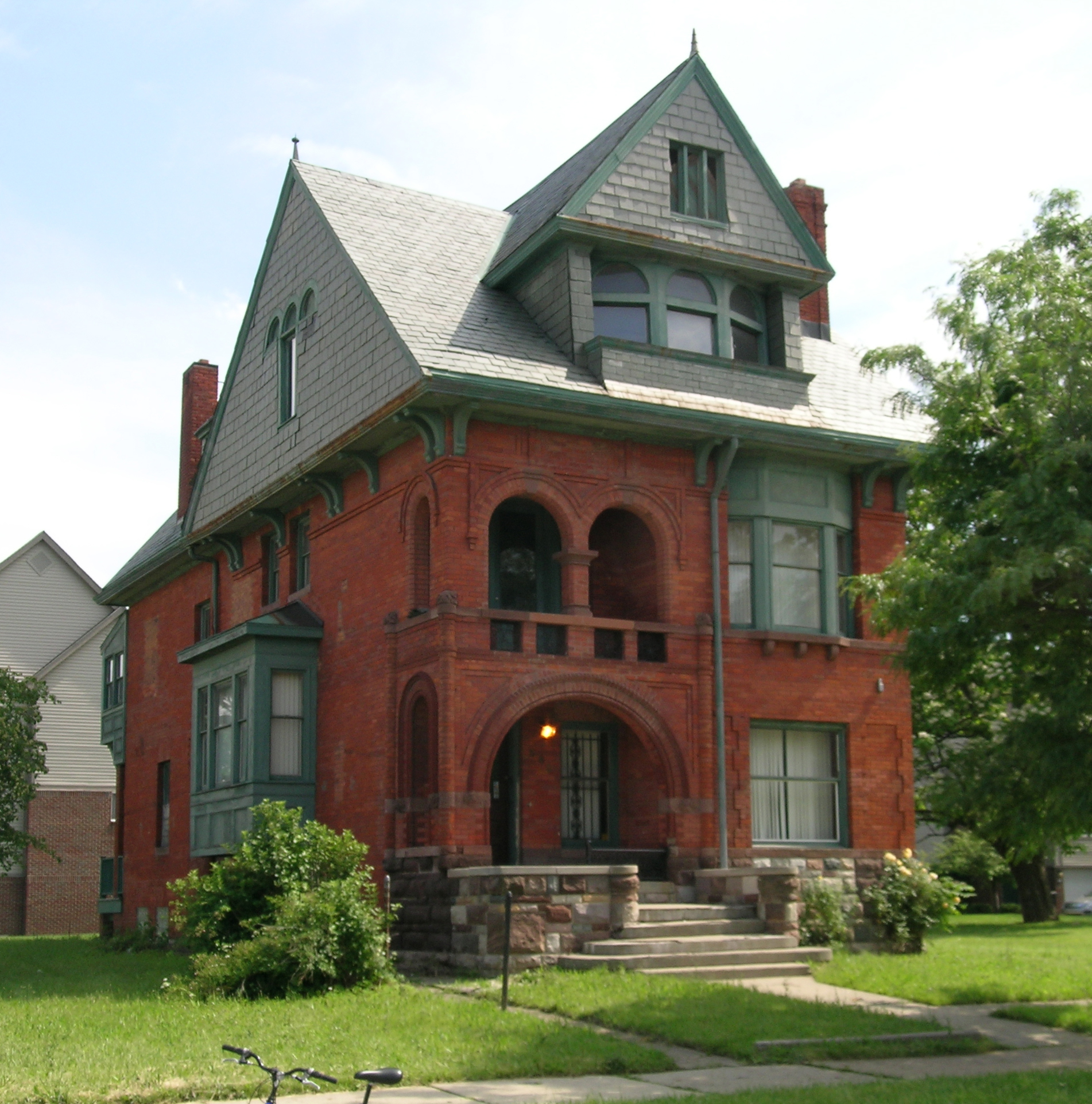

Geography
- Location: Michigan, United States

Organization
- Type: General

Services
- Beds: 27

History
- Former name: Parkside Hospital after 1928
- Opened: 1918
- Closed: 1962

Links
- Lists: Hospitals in Michigan
- Dunbar Hospital
- U.S. National Register of Historic Places
- Michigan State Historic Site
- Location: 580 Frederick Street; Detroit, Michigan
- Coordinates: 42°21′42″N 83°3′32″W
- Built: 1892
- Architect: Guy W. Vinton
- Architectural style: Romanesque Revival, Queen Anne
- NRHP reference No.: 79001172

Significant dates
- Added to NRHP: June 19, 1979
- Designated MSHS: April 11, 1977

The Dunbar Hospital was the first hospital for the Black community in Detroit, Michigan, United States. It is located at 580 Frederick Street, and is currently the administrative headquarters of the Detroit Medical Society. It was listed on the National Register of Historic Places in 1979.

== Building construction and description ==
The building housing the Dunbar Hospital was built in 1892 by the Guy W. Vinton Company as a home for real estate developer Charles W. Warren. The home was constructed in a fashionable 19th century residential district.

The structure is a three-story home of mixed Romanesque Revival and Queen Anne style, built of red brick and rough-cut ashlar. The entrance is through a recessed, arched first-floor porch and the second story has a double-arch brick balcony. The roof is slate, with a bay-windowed gabled dormer surmounting the front façade.

== Founding of the Dunbar Hospital ==
In 1894, Dr. James W. Ames, a graduate of both Straight University and Howard University, arrived in Detroit after a stint of teaching in New Orleans. He quickly became influential in both Detroit's white community and its then-small Black community. Detroit's mayor at the time was Hazen S. Pingree. During his subsequent re-election campaign, Pingree actively courted the Black vote, in part by supporting Ames's bid for election to the Michigan state legislature.

The nationally famous Black poet Paul Laurence Dunbar, popular in both the Black and white community, visited Detroit and lent his voice to those supporting Pingree, penning the poem "Vote for Pingree and Vote for Bread". Both Ames and Pingree won their respective elections, and Ames spent the next two years in the legislature. He was the last black elected until the 1920s.

Two decades later, in the years following World War I, the black population of Detroit soared. In 1910, fewer than 6000 blacks called the city home; in 1917 more than 30,000 Blacks lived in Detroit. The increase in Black residents led to a crisis in health care. Hospitals were still segregated, and physicians like Ames were required to ask permission to admit Black patients. Often black patients were simply denied care. The increase in the Black population threatened to overwhelm the city's 30 Black doctors.

In 1918, Ames led the group of 30 Black physicians to form the Allied Medical Society. The area around Frederick Street was at the cusp of becoming the center of social and cultural life for Detroit's Black community, and the AMS purchased the Warren home on Frederick They opened their own non-profit hospital in the building, the first in the city to serve the Black community, as well as an associated nursing school. The hospital was named for the poet Dunbar, who had died in 1906. The hospital had 27 beds and an operating room.

== Later history ==
In 1928, demand led Dunbar Hospital to move from its first home to a larger facility several blocks to the east. The facility was renamed Parkside Hospital, and continued in operation until 1962. Soon after Dunbar moved from its home on Frederick, Charles Diggs Sr., who was later the first African-American Democratic state senator, purchased the home. Diggs's son, Charles C. Diggs Jr., served in the Michigan State Senate from 1951 to 1954 and the U.S. House of Representatives from 1954 to 1980. In 1978, the Detroit Medical Society (the successor to the Allied Medical Society) purchased and restored the building. It now serves as their administrative headquarters and a museum.
