= James L. Curtis =

American diplomat

James L. Curtis (1870 – October 24, 1917) was the American Minister Resident/Consul General to Liberia (1915–1917). During his tenure, Curtis was able to obtain Liberia's support for the Allied cause in World War I.

Curtis died in Free Town, Sierra Leone where he had gone to have an operation related to an undisclosed illness. Prior to his tenure as ambassador, he was a lawyer most closely associated with Tammany Hall.
