= Straight University =

Private university in New Orleans, U.S.

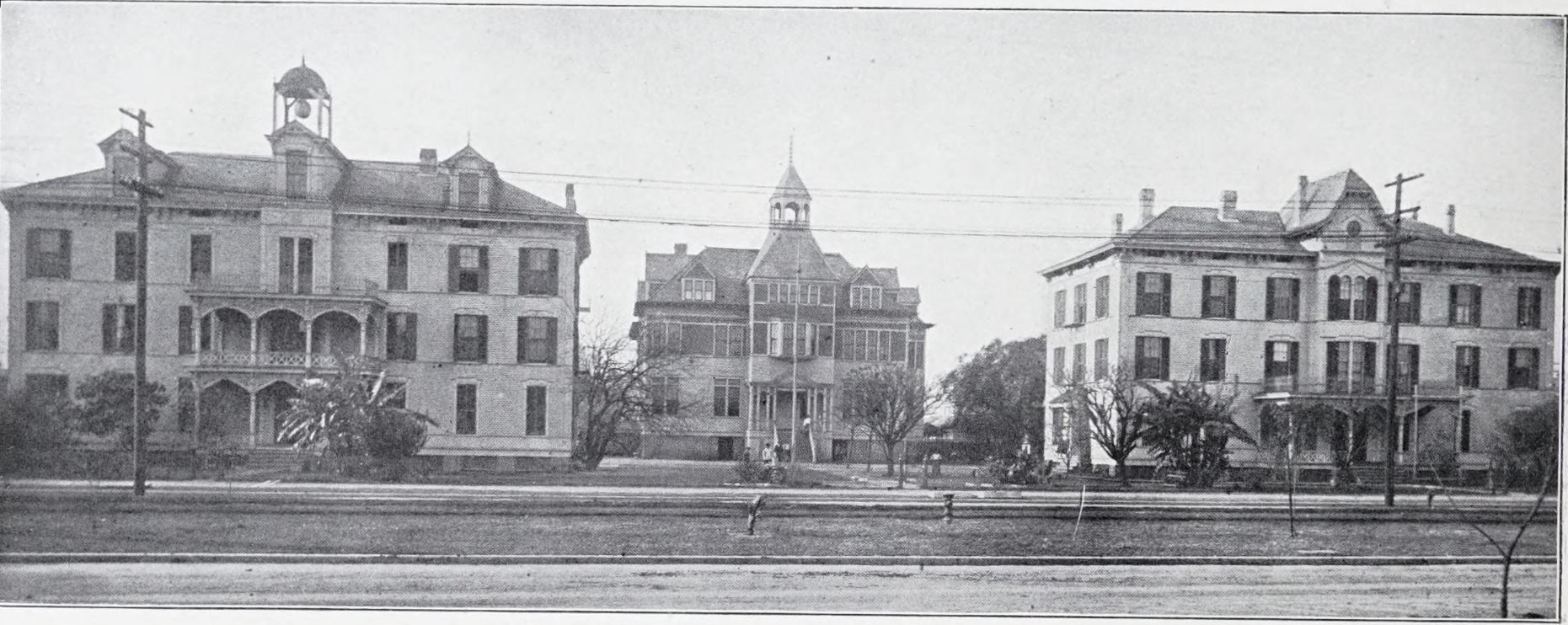
- The school's campus, c. 1910
- Former names: Straight Congregational University; Straight College (1915–1934)
- Type: Private, HBCU
- Active: 1868–1934
- Affiliations: American Missionary Association
- Location: New Orleans, Louisiana, United States; 29.9630°N 90.0849°W

Straight University (known as Straight College after 1915) was an American historically black college that operated between 1868 and 1934 in New Orleans, Louisiana. After struggling with financial difficulties, it was merged with New Orleans University to form Dillard University.

== History ==
Responding to the post-Civil War need to educate newly freed African Americans in New Orleans, Louisiana, and the surrounding region, the American Missionary Association of the Congregational Church founded Straight University on June 12, 1868.

Straight University received its name as recognition for Seymour Straight's initial endowment gift. Straight was a wealthy cheese manufacturer from Hudson, Ohio. In 1915, the name "Straight University" was changed to Straight College, which more accurately represented the scope of the school's curriculum and program. Missionary work was a core concern, but was primarily prompted and championed by the post-war local need of providing a school where African Americans could aspire to the highest education available after Emancipation. Classes were first held in a Congregational church, but by 1871, a main university building was erected on the northeast corner of Esplanade Avenue and N. Derbigny Street.

As Union soldiers left New Orleans in 1877, the main university building was set ablaze in an act of arson. The structure was completely demolished, and the campus was relocated to the corner of Canal Street and Tonti Street. In 1930, Straight merged with New Orleans University to form Dillard University, Louisiana's oldest historically black university. which extended from New Orleans to Africa.

It was a college that admitted students regardless of their backgrounds, advertising in 1871:

The old and young can enter at this Institution any day, no distinction made in regard to race or color. The design of the Institution, is to furnish opportunities to those wishing a rapid, thorough and practical business education [...]. Parties having ordinary ability, who have entirely neglected their education now have the opportunity to qualify themselves for almost any position in the State, in an incredible short time. From two to three months is all that requires to complete the commeral [sic] course. Terms duced to suit the times [sic].

Throughout its history, Straight offered courses of study ranging from elementary- to college-level courses in music and theology. In 1934, after struggling with financial difficulties during the Great Depression, Straight College was merged with New Orleans University to form Dillard University.

== Law department ==
Straight University also offered professional training, including a law department from 1874 to 1886. Its graduates participated in local and national Reconstruction and post-Reconstruction era civil rights struggles. For example, Louis André Martinet, an 1876 graduate of Straight University Law School, published The Crusader—a civil rights daily; co-founded the Comité des Citoyens (Citizens' Committee) in New Orleans, which worked for civil rights; and played a significant role in setting up the challenge to segregation of Plessy v. Ferguson, a landmark Supreme Court case. His classmate Dan Desdunes joined him in this effort before moving to North Omaha, Nebraska, to become a band leader.

The Law department is historically notable as an integrated institution where blacks and whites were trained side by side. "It is an interesting fact of our 50 law graduates, 35 have been white." The school struggled to provide its law students with a proper research library. The students typically met for classes in the law professors' offices.

In 1886, Straight discontinued the Law Department. It began to focus primarily on liberal arts, industrial arts, and teacher training.

== Campus ==
Straight University presidents
W. S. Alexander	1869–1876
James A. Adams	1877–1884
R. C. Hitchcock	1885–1889
Oscar Atwood	1890–1902
Richard C. Hastings	1903–1906
Stephen G. Butcher	1907–1908
Elbert M. Stevens	1909–1915
Howard A. M. Briggs	1916–1921
James Putnam O'Brien	1922–1930
Charles B. Austin	1931–1935

The campus faced Canal Street, occupying the block between Tonti and Rocheblave streets backed by Gasquet (now Cleveland Avenue). After the university was merged with the newly created Dillard University, the campus buildings served as a school and YWCA for nearly two decades. They were demolished in 1950.

== Notable alumni ==
Some graduates brought education and medical care to African Americans during the early part of the 20th century. Physician James W. Ames, for example, founded the first hospital for blacks in Detroit in 1910. He created Dunbar Hospital for physicians and patients of color, as they were unable to practice in or be admitted to Detroit hospitals operated by whites.

Other notable alumni include:

- Mary Booze, politician; first African American to sit on the Republican National Committee, serving from Mississippi from 1924 to 1948
- Theodore K. Lawless, dermatologist and philanthropist
- Nellie A. Ramsey Leslie, who became a pioneer teacher in Indian Territory and later in Texas.
- Ernest Lyon, Belize-born educator, minister, and U.S. Ambassador to Liberia
- Alice Dunbar Nelson, poet and journalist; forerunner of the Harlem Renaissance
- P.B.S. Pinchback, 24th governor of Louisiana and first African-American governor of any U.S. state (Pinchback was additionally the second African-American lieutenant governor of Louisiana)
- Tom Yarborough, mayor of Elsinore, California, who was the first Black mayor in California

== See also ==
- Storer College

== Bibliography ==
- Majors, Monroe A. (1893). Noted Negro Women, Their Triumphs and Activities (Reprint 1971 by Freeport, New York: Books for Libraries Press ed.). Chicago, Illinois: Donohue and Henneberry. ISBN 0-8369-8733-0.
- Laborde, Peggy Scott; Magill, John T. (2006). Canal Street: New Orleans' Great Wide Way. China: Pelican Publishing Company, Inc. ISBN 9781589803374. LCCN 2006010529.
