= List of Louisiana Creoles =

This is a list of notable Louisiana Creole people.

To be included in this list, the person must have a Wikipedia article showing they are Louisiana Creoles or must have references showing they are Louisiana Creoles and are notable.

== List ==
=== Arts, culture, and entertainment ===
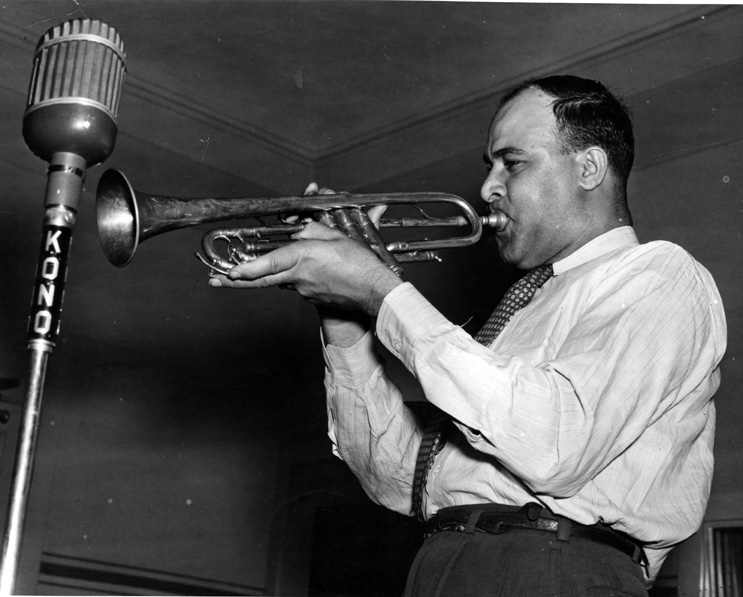
Don Albert

- Don Albert (1908–1980) – jazz trumpeter and bandleader
- Fernest Arceneaux (1940–2008) – zydeco accordionist and singer from Louisiana
- Alphonse "Bois Sec" Ardoin (1915–2007) – accordionist
- Amede Ardoin (1898–1942) – zydeco musician
- Chris Ardoin (born 1981) – zydeco accordionist and singer
- Sean Ardoin (born 1970) – zydeco musician and singer
- K.D. Aubert (born 1978) – actress and fashion model
- Vernel Bagneris (born 1949) – playwright, actor, director, singer, and dancer; named after his cousin Vernel Fournier
- Louis Barbarin (1902–1997) – New Orleans jazz drummer
- Paul Barbarin (1899–1969) – New Orleans jazz drummer, usually regarded (along with Baby Dodds) as one of the best of the pre-Big Band era jazz drummers
- Achille Baquet (1885–1955) – jazz clarinetist and saxophonist
- George Baquet (1881–1949) – jazz clarinetist, known for his contributions to early jazz in New Orleans
- Blue Lu Barker (1913–1998) – jazz and blues singer; her better known recordings included "Don't You Feel My Leg" and "Look What Baby's Got For You"
- Danny Barker (1909–1994) – jazz banjoist, singer, guitarist, songwriter, ukulele player
- Richmond Barthé (1901–1989) – sculptor
- Dave Bartholomew (1918–2019) – musician, band leader, composer and arranger, prominent in the music of New Orleans throughout the second half of the 20th century
- Jon Batiste (born 1986) – singer, multi-instrumentalist, educator, and bandleader from Kenner, Louisiana; music director and bandleader for The Late Show with Stephen Colbert and its band Stay Human
- Lionel Batiste (1931–2012) – jazz and blues musician and singer from New Orleans
- Sidney Bechet (1897–1959) – jazz saxophonist, clarinetist and composer

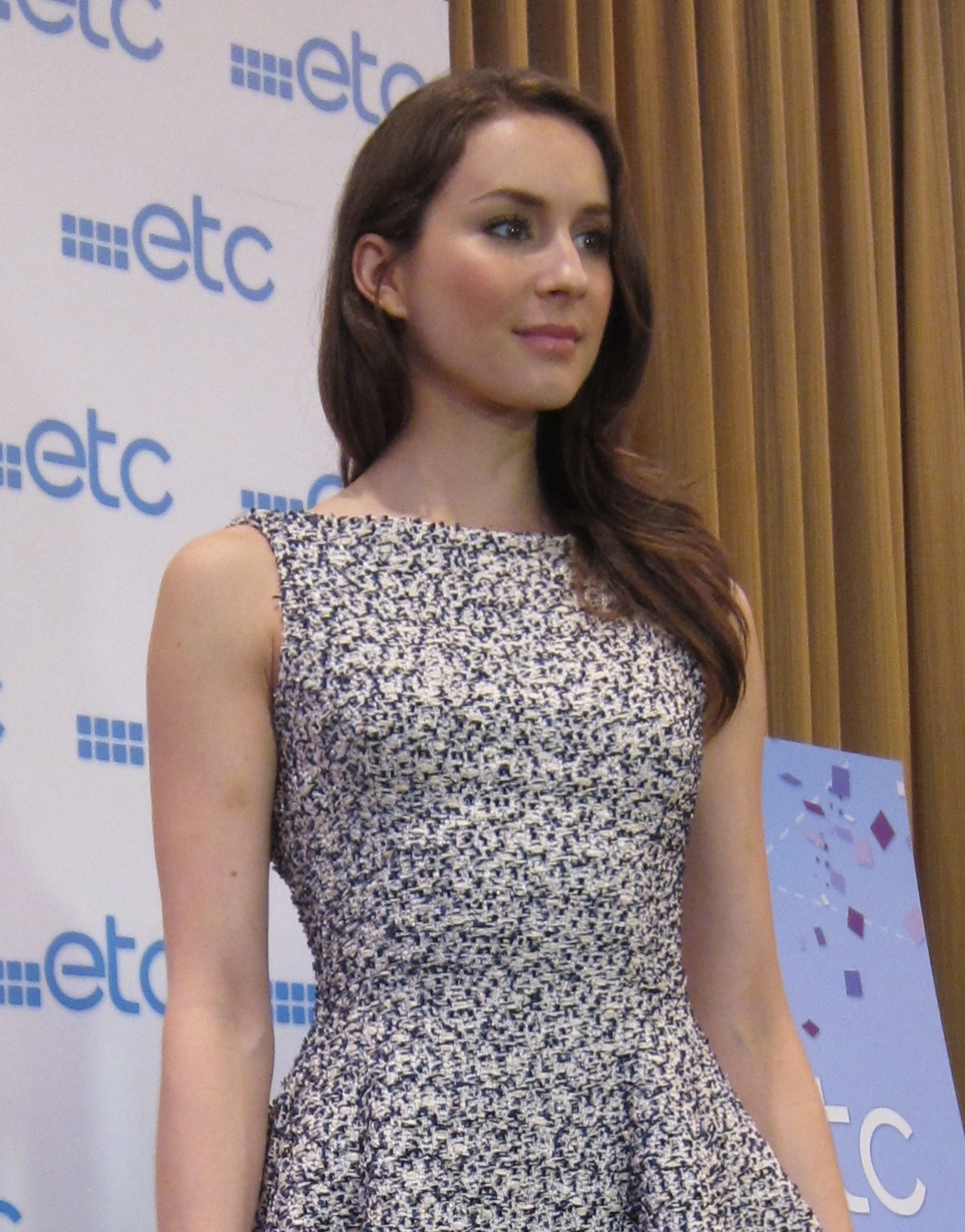
Troian Bellisario in Manila in February 2013

- Troian Bellisario (born 1985) – actress; stars as Spencer Hastings in the ABC Family series Pretty Little Liars
- E.J. Bellocq (1873–1949) – photographer
- Jimmy Bertrand (1900–1960) – jazz and blues drummer
- Alex Bigard (1899–1978) – jazz drummer. He was the brother of Barney Bigard and cousin of Natty Dominique and A.J. Piron, and was involved for decades with the New Orleans jazz scene.

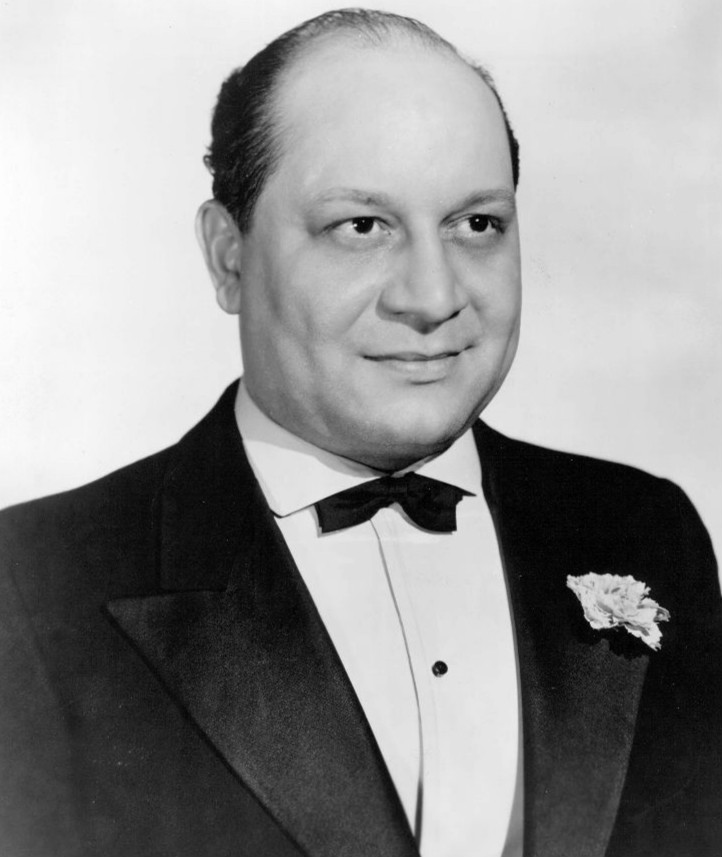
Barney Bigard

- Barney Bigard (1906–1980) – jazz clarinetist
- Esther Bigeou (1895–1936) – blues singer; billed as "The Girl with the Million Dollar Smile"; one of the classic female blues singers popular in the 1920s
- Eddie Bo (1930–2009) – singer and pianist from New Orleans
- Peter Bocage (1887–1967) – cornet player; also played violin professionally, as well as sometimes trombone, banjo, and xylophone; cousin of New Orleans R&B musician Eddie Bo
- Denise Boutte (born 1982) – actress and model
- John Boutté (born 1958) – jazz singer
- Wellman Braud (1891–1966) – jazz upright bassist
- Jeffery Broussard (born 1967) – zydeco musician
- John Brunious (born 1940) – jazz trumpeter
- Wendell Brunious (born 1954) – jazz trumpeter
- Calvin Carriere (1921–2002) – fiddler
- Joseph "Bébé" Carrière (1908–2001) – fiddler
- Chubby Carrier (born 1967) – zydeco musician
- Roy Carrier (1947–2010) – zydeco musician
- Blue Ivy Carter (born 2012) - dancer
- Inez Catalon (c. 1913–1994) – Creole singer
- Papa Celestin (1884–1954) – jazz bandleader, trumpeter, cornetist and vocalist
- Leah Chase (1923–2019) – chef, author and television personality
- Boozoo Chavis (1930–2001) – musician and one of the pioneers of zydeco music
- Clifton Chenier (1925–1987) – zydeco musician
- C.J. Chenier (born 1957) – zydeco musician and son of the Grammy Award-winning "King of Zydeco", Clifton Chenier
- Ralph Chessé (1900–1991) – artist, muralist, puppeteer, theater owner, actor
- Frank Christian (1887–1973) – early jazz trumpeter
- Savannah Churchill (1920–1974) – singer of pop, jazz, and blues music
- Robert Colescott (1925–2009) – painter
- Warrington Colescott (1921–2018) – artist
- Florestine Perrault Collins (1895–1988) – photographer
- Charles Connor (1935–2021) – drummer, best known as a member of Little Richard's band
- Louis Cottrell, Jr. (1911–1978) – jazz clarinetist and tenor saxophonist
- Coline Creuzot (born 1985) – singer and Sony ATV songwriter; granddaughter of Percy Creuzot Jr, founder of Frenchy's Chicken, a popular creole restaurant chain based in Houston
- Joe Darensbourg (1906–1985) – jazz clarinetist and saxophonist notable for his work with Buddy Petit, Jelly Roll Morton, Charlie Creath, Fate Marable, Andy Kirk, Kid Ory, Wingy Manone, Joe Liggins and Louis Armstrong
- Damita Jo DeBlanc (1930–1998) – actress, comedian, and lounge music performer
- Edmonde Dede (1829–1903) – composer

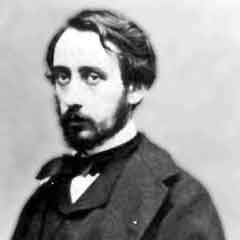
Edgar Degas

- Edgar Degas (1834–1917) – artist famous for his paintings, sculptures, prints, and drawings; cousin of Norbert Rillieux; eldest of five children of Célestine Musson De Gas, a Creole from New Orleans, and Augustin De Gas, a banker
- Harold Dejan (1909–2002) – jazz alto saxophonist and bandleader

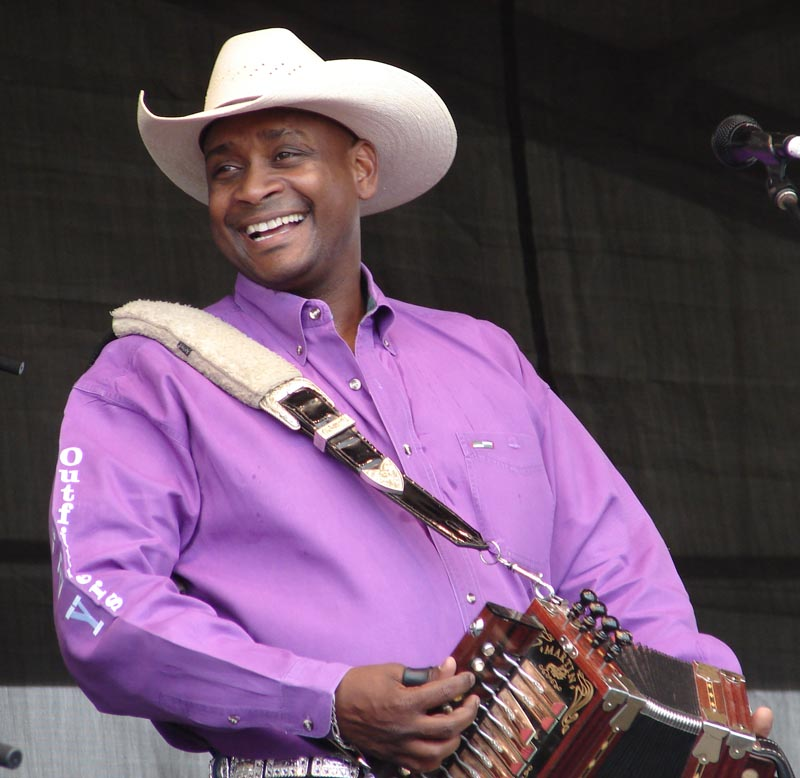
Geno Delafose

- Geno Delafose (born 1972) – zydeco accordionist
- John Delafose (1939–1994) – zydeco accordionist
- Louis Nelson Delisle (1885–1949) – Dixieland jazz clarinetist
- Sidney Desvigne (1893–1959) – jazz trumpeter.
- Faith Domergue (1924–1999) – television and film actress
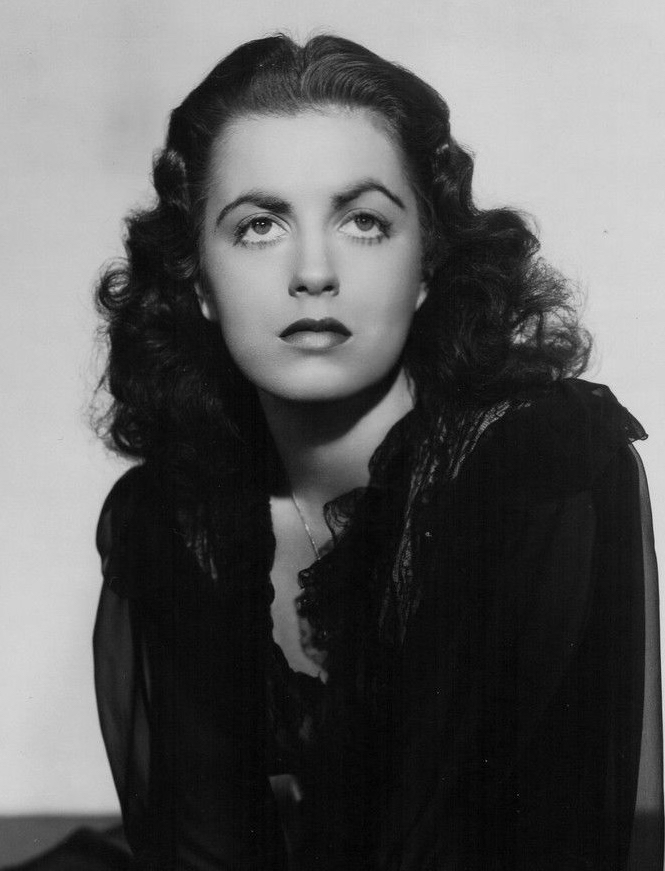
  Faith Domergue
- Natty Dominique (1896–1982) – jazz trumpeter
- Fats Domino (1928–2017) – classic R&B and rock and roll singer, songwriter and pianist
- Rockin' Dopsie (1932–1993) – leading zydeco musician and button accordion player who enjoyed popular success first in Europe and later in the United States
- Peter DuConge (1903–1967) – jazz reedist
- Lawrence Duhe (1887–1960) – jazz clarinetist and bandleader; member of Sugar Johnnie's New Orleans Creole Orchestra
- Honore Dutrey (1894–1934) – Dixieland jazz trombonist
- Ava DuVernay (born 1972) – film director, producer, screenwriter
- Sheila E. (born 1957) – percussionist, singer, composer and producer
- Mignon Faget (born 1933) – jewelry designer based in her native New Orleans
- Lionel Ferbos (1911–2014) – New Orleans jazz trumpeter
- Lil' Fizz (born 1985) – rapper, former B2K member
- Canray Fontenot (1922–1995) – fiddle player
- Vernel Fournier (1928–2000) – jazz drummer
- Keith Frank (born 1972) – Zydeco musician
- Preston Frank (born 1947) – Zydeco musician
- D'Jalma Garnier (born 1954) – musician and composer
- Tony Garnier (born 1956) – bassist (both double bass and bass guitar), best known as an accompanist to Bob Dylan, with whom he has played since 1989
- Virginie Amelie Avegno Gautreau (1859–1915) – model and socialite
- Louis Moreau Gottschalk (1829–1869) – composer and pianist, known as a virtuoso performer of his own romantic piano pieces
- George Guesnon (1907–1968) – jazz banjoist, guitarist, composer, and singer

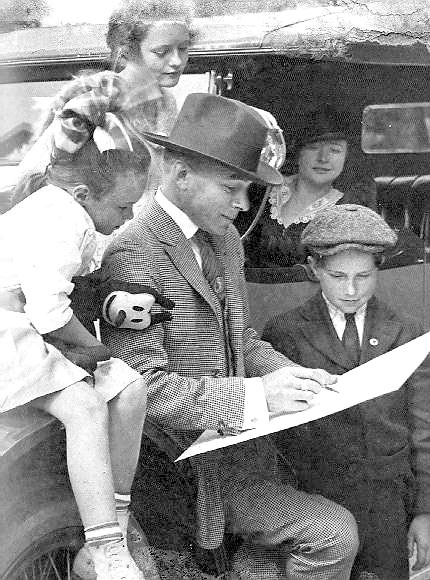
George Herriman

- Joe Hall – la la and Cajun musician
- George Herriman (1880–1944) – cartoonist, known for his comic strip Krazy Kat
- Andrew Hilaire (1899–1935) – jazz drummer
- Marques Houston (born 1981) – singer and actor

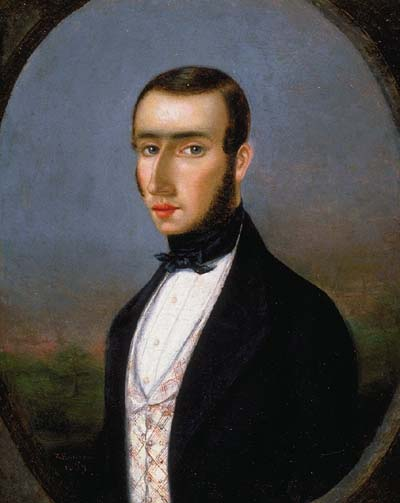
Julien Hudson

- Julien Hudson (1811–1844) – painter and art teacher
- Clementine Hunter (1886–1988) – self-taught folk artist from the Cane River region in Louisiana
- Queen Ida (born 1929) – zydeco accordion player
- Ice-T (born 1958) – musician and actor
- Michelle Jacques – singer and music educator
- Illinois Jacquet (1922–2004) – jazz tenor saxophonist, best remembered for his solo on "Flying Home", critically recognized as the first R&B saxophone solo
- Russell Jacquet (1917–1990) – trumpeter. He was the elder brother of well-known tenor saxophonist Illinois Jacquet, who he worked with through the years.
- Al Jarreau (1940–2017) – singer and musician. He received a total of seven Grammy Awards and was nominated for over a dozen more. Jarreau is perhaps best known for his 1981 album Breakin' Away.
- Beau Jocque (1953–1999) – zydeco musician
- Beverly Johnson (born 1952) – model, actress, and businesswoman
- Ty Granderson Jones (born 1964) – actor, screenwriter and producer
- Leatrice Joy (1893–1985) – actress most prolific during the silent film era
- Ernie K-Doe (1936–2001) – R&B singer best known for his 1961 hit single "Mother-in-Law" which went to No. 1 on the Billboard pop chart in the U.S.
- Freddie Keppard (1890–1993) – jazz cornetist

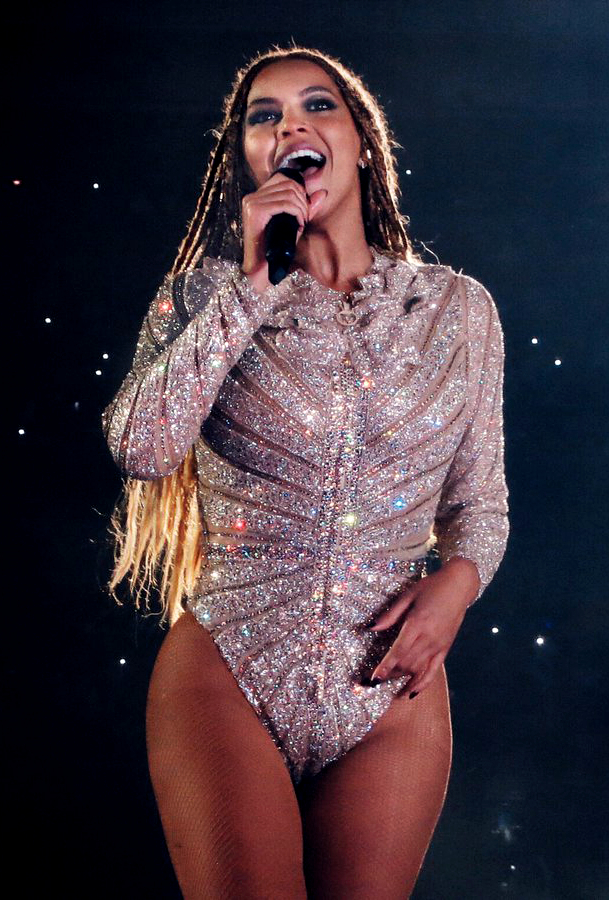
Beyoncé Knowles

- Beyoncé Knowles (born 1981) – R&B singer
- Solange Knowles (born 1986) – R&B singer
- Tina Knowles (born 1954) – fashion designer
- The Knux (born 1982 & 1984) – musicians, rappers, singers, record producers
- Dorothy LaBostrie (1929–2007) – songwriter, best known for co-writing Little Richard's 1955 hit "Tutti Frutti"
- Lenny LaCour (born 1932) – record producer, songwriter and performer, particularly active from the mid-1950s to the mid-1970s
- Dorothy Lamour (1914–1996) – actress and singer
- Vilayna LaSalle – model
- Charles Lucien Lambert (1828–1896) – pianist and composer
- Lucien-Léon Guillaume Lambert (1858–1945) – pianist and composer
- Sidney Lambert (born 1838) – pianist and composer
- Carmen De Lavallade (born 1931) – choreographer, actress
- Sabrina Le Beauf (born 1958) – actress; played Sandra on the television series The Cosby Show
- Jeni Le Gon (1916–2012) – dancer, dance instructor, and actress

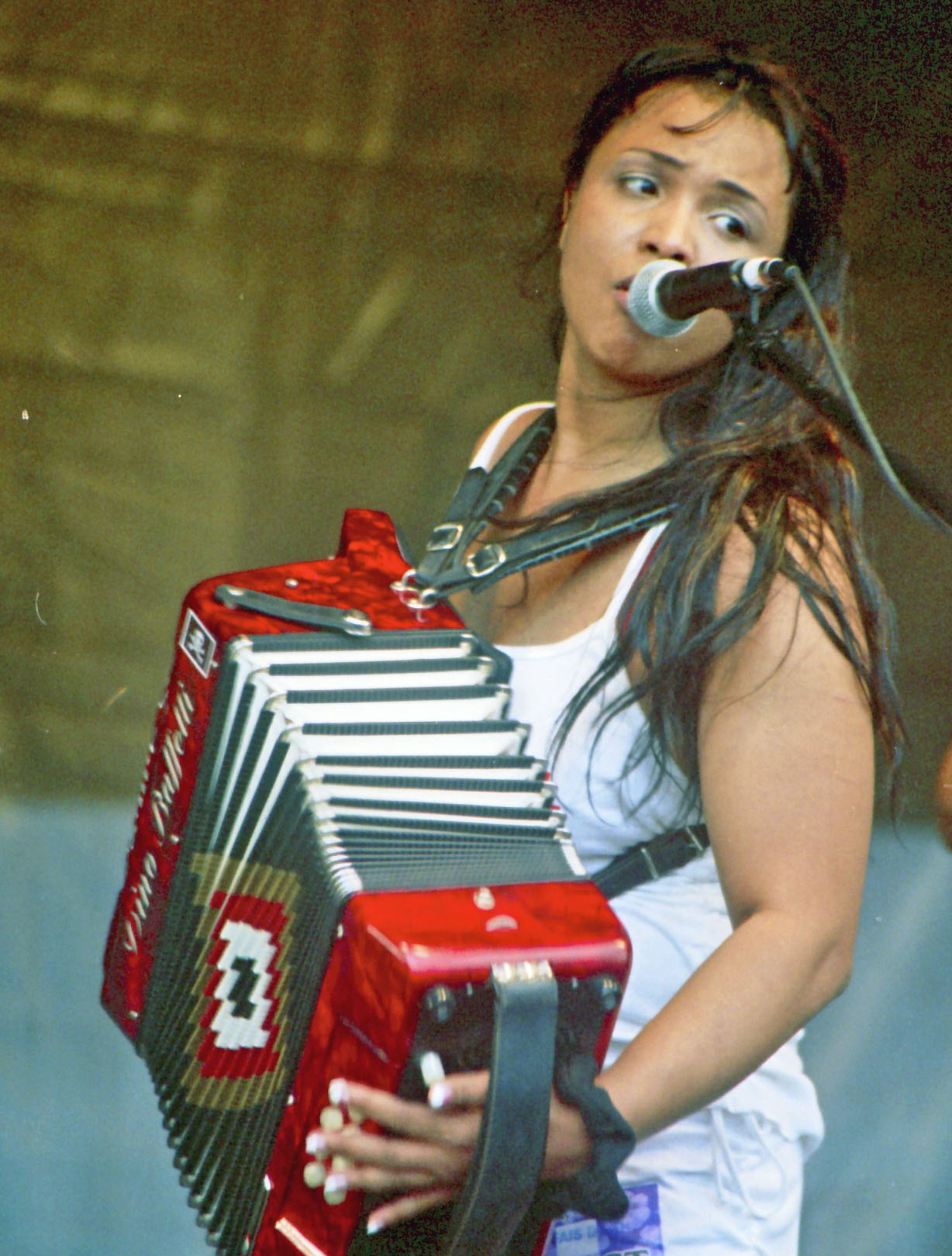
Rosie Ledet

- Rosie Ledet (born 1971) – zydeco singer and accordion player
- Harry Lennix (born 1964) – actor; best known for his roles as Terrence "Dresser" Williams in the Robert Townsend film The Five Heartbeats and as Boyd Langton in the Joss Whedon television series Dollhouse
- George Lewis (1900–1968) – jazz clarinetist
- Jules Lion (1809–1866) – photographer
- Branford Marsalis (born 1960) – saxophonist, composer and bandleader
- Wynton Marsalis (born 1961) – jazz trumpeter, composer and bandleader

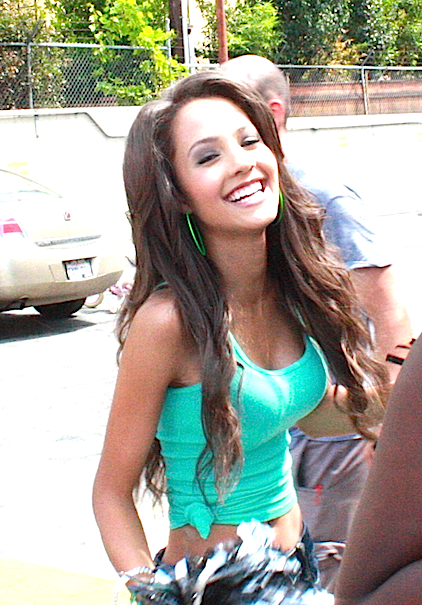
Tristin Mays

- Tristin Mays (born 1990) – actress and singer; played Shaina in the Nickelodeon series Gullah Gullah Island and Robin Dixon in Alias
- Victor-Eugene McCarty (born between 1817 and 1823) – composer
- Rocky McKeon – musician

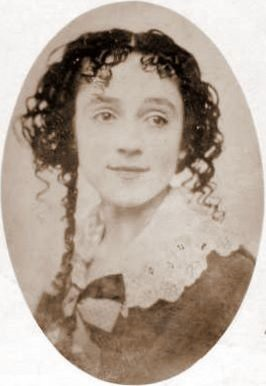
Adah Isaacs Menken

- Adah Isaacs Menken (1835–1868) – actress, painter, poet
- Michel'le (born 1970) – R&B singer, former girlfriend of Dr. Dre; married to Suge Knight
- Janee Michelle (born 1946) – actress, model, and businessperson best known for her role in the 1974 horror film The House on Skull Mountain
- Lizzie Miles (1895–1963) – blues singer
- Ziggy Modeliste (born 1948) – drummer best known as a founding member of the funk group The Meters
- Allison Montana (1922–2005) – New Orleans cultural icon who acted as the Mardi Gras Indian "chief of chiefs" for over 50 years
- Deacon John Moore (born 1941) – blues, rhythm and blues and rock and roll musician, singer, and bandleader
- Morris W. Morris (1845–1906) – American Civil War soldier of the Louisiana Native Guards; stage actor
- Jelly Roll Morton (1885–1941) – virtuoso pianist, bandleader and composer
- Archibald Motley (1891–1981) – painter
- Idris Muhammad (1939–2014) – jazz drummer who recorded extensively with many musicians, including Ahmad Jamal, Lou Donaldson, Pharoah Sanders, and Tete Montoliu.
- Aaron Neville (born 1941) – soul and R&B singer and musician.
- Albert Nicholas (1900–1973) – jazz reed player
- Wooden Joe Nicholas (1883–1957) – jazz trumpeter and cornetist, active in the early New Orleans jazz scene
- Jimmie Noone (1895–1944) – jazz clarinetist and bandleader
- Brittany O'Grady (born 1996) – actress who plays Simone Davis on the TV series Star
- Kid Ory (1886–1973) – jazz trombonist and bandleader
- Jimmy Palao (1879–1925) – jazz bandleader
- Ernest "Doc" Paulin (1907–2007) – jazz trumpeter and bandleader
- Alcide Pavageau (1888–1969) – jazz guitarist and double-bassist
- Manuel Perez (1871–1946) – clarinetist and bandleader
- Louis Lucien Pessou (1824–1886) – printmaker, early color lithographer
- Buddie Petit (1890–1931) – early jazz cornetist
- Joseph Petit (1873–1945) – jazz trombonist
- Fats Pichon (1906–1967) – jazz pianist, singer, bandleader, and songwriter
- Alphonse Picou (1878–1961) – jazz clarinetist
- De De Pierce (1904–1973) – trumpeter and cornetist; best remembered for the songs "Peanut Vendor" and "Dippermouth Blues", both with Billie Pierce
- Armand J. Piron (1888–1943) – jazz violinist, band leader, and composer
- Deborah Pratt (born 1951) – actress, writer and television producer
- Prince (1958–2016) – singer-songwriter, musician and producer
- Regis Prograis (born 1989) – professional boxer
- Wardell Quezergue (1930–2011) – music arranger, producer, and bandleader
- Chris Rene (born 1982) – singer-songwriter, musician and producer from Santa Cruz, California
- Googie Rene (1927–2007) – musician and songwriter
- Leon Rene (1902–1982) – music composer of R&B and rock and roll songs in the 1930s, 1940s, and 1950s
- Dawn Richard (1983) – singer-songwriter
- Robert Ri'chard (born 1983) – actor

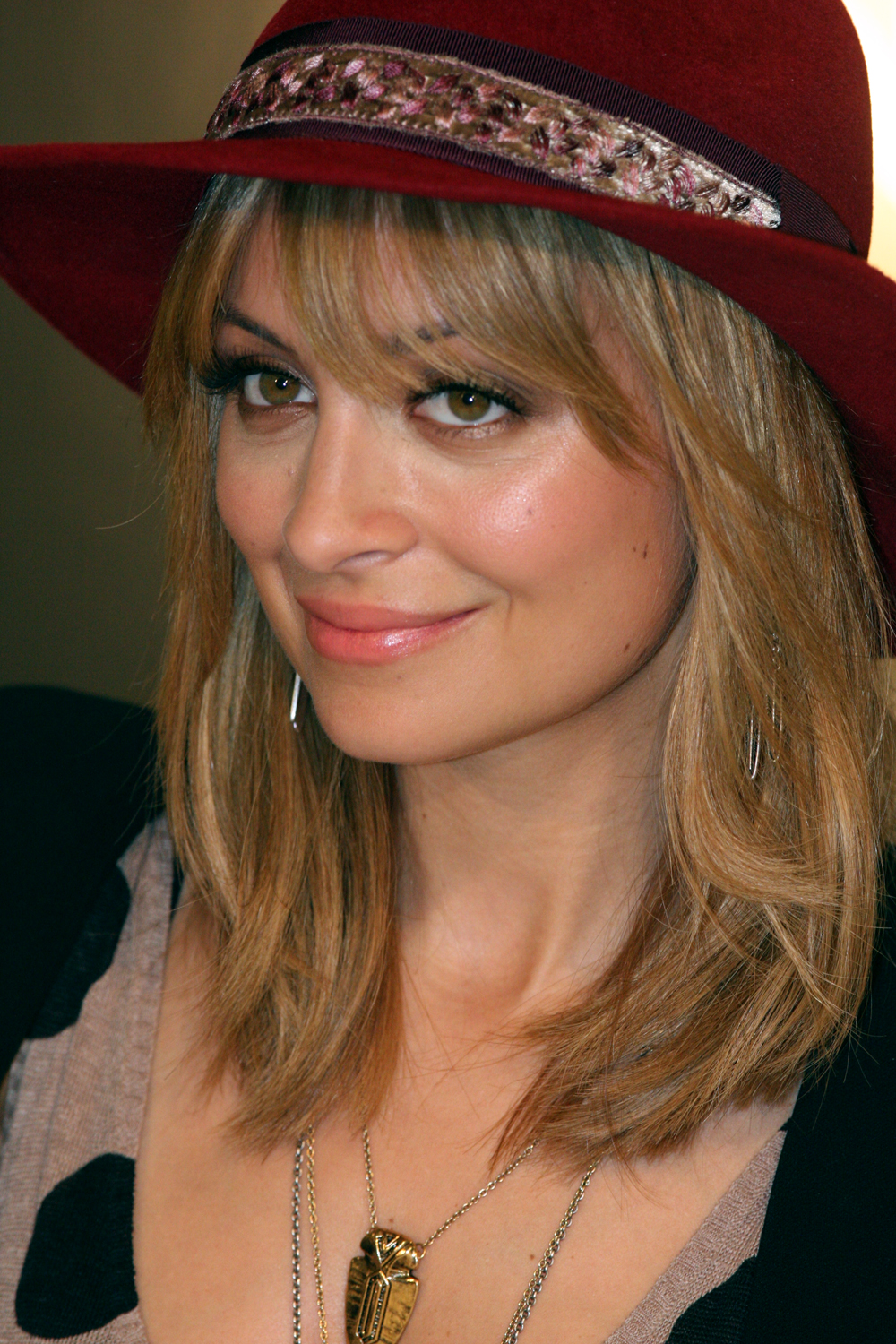
Nicole Richie in store appearance at the 2012 David Jones Photo Call in Sydney

- Nicole Richie (born 1981) – television personality, fashion designer
- LaTavia Roberson (born 1981) – singe-songwriter, and actress
- Joe Robichaux (1900–1965) – jazz pianist; nephew of John Robichaux
- John Robichaux (1866–1939) – jazz bandleader, drummer, and violinist; uncle of Joseph Robichaux
- Erica Blaire Roby (born 1983)- Food Network BBQ Brawl Champion
- RuPaul (born 1960) – actor, drag queen, model, author, television personality, and recording artist
- Betye Saar (1926–2026) – artist known for her work in the field of assemblage
- Brytni Sarpy (born 1987) – actress best known for her portrayal of Valerie Spencer on the ABC Daytime soap opera General Hospital
- Rockin' Sidney (1938–1998) – R&B, zydeco, and soul musician
- Omer Simeon (1902–1959) – jazz clarinetist

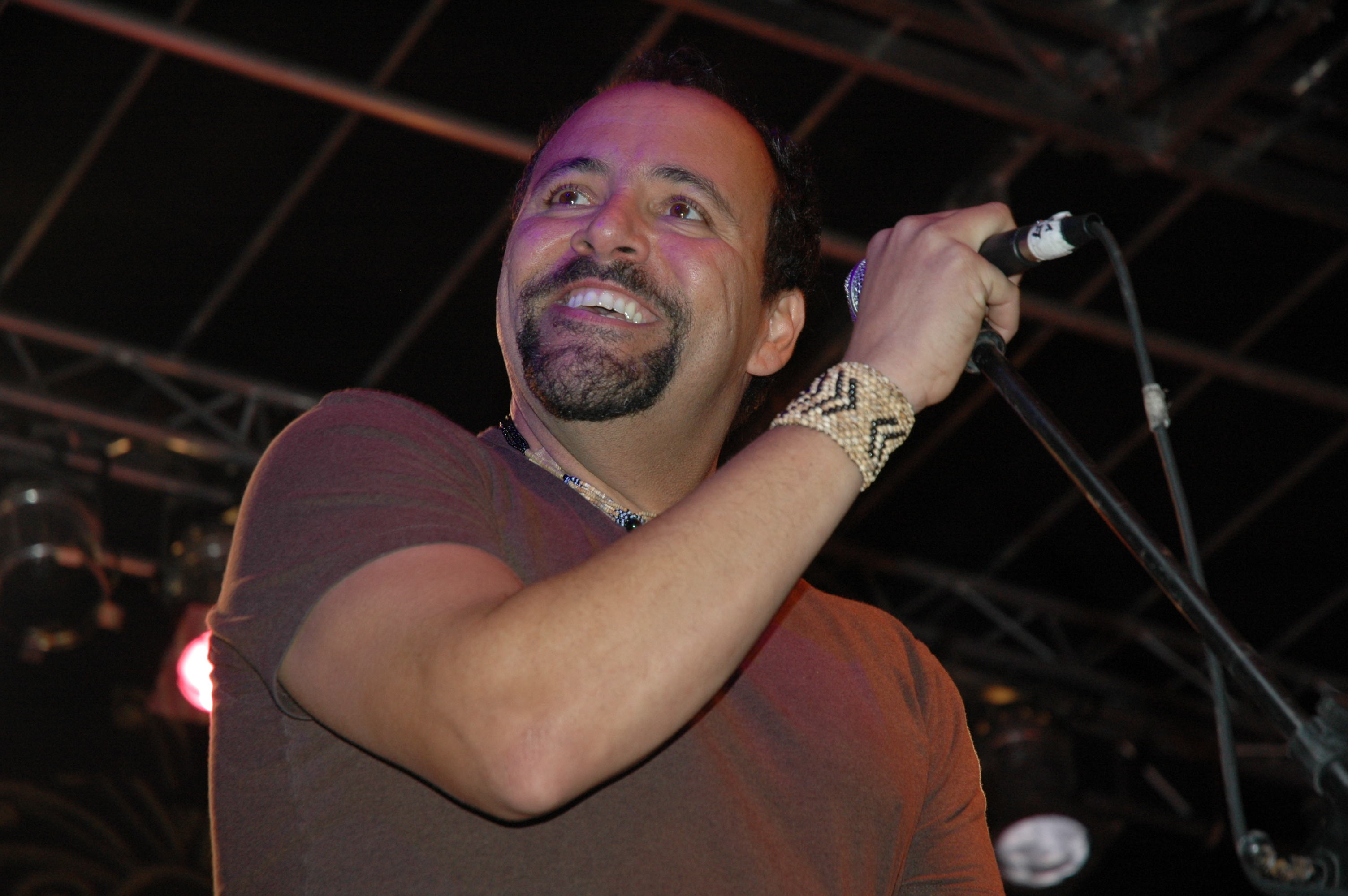
Terrance Simien

- Terrance Simien (born 1965) – zydeco musician, vocalist, and songwriter
- Lil' Buck Sinegal (1944–2019) – blues and zydeco musician
- Roger Guenveur Smith (born 1955) – actor, director, and writer
- Betty Reid Soskin (1921–2025) – Park Ranger with the National Park Service, assigned to the Rosie the Riveter/World War II Home Front National Historical Park in Richmond, California
- Tracie Spencer (born 1976) – R&B and pop singer-songwriter, actress, and model
- Johnny St. Cyr (1890–1966) – jazz banjoist and guitarist
- Raven-Symoné (born 1985) – actress and singer
- William J. Tennyson Jr. (1923–1959) – jazz musician
- Andre Thierry (born 1979) – Grammy-nominated zydeco musician; leads the band Zydeco Magic
- Lorenzo Tio Jr. (1893–1933) – jazz clarinetist
- Allen Toussaint (1938–2015) – musician, composer, record producer, and influential figure in New Orleans R&B
- Mr. T (born 1952) – actor known for his roles as B. A. Baracus in the 1980s television series The A-Team and as boxer Clubber Lang in the 1982 film Rocky III, and for his appearances as a professional wrestler
- Vicki Vann (born 1980) – country music artist, model and actress
- Little Walter (1930–1968) – blues musician and singer
- Lynn Whitfield (born 1953) – actress
- Nathan Williams (born 1964) – zydeco accordionist and singer
- Buckwheat Zydeco (1947–2016) – accordionist and zydeco musician

=== Business ===
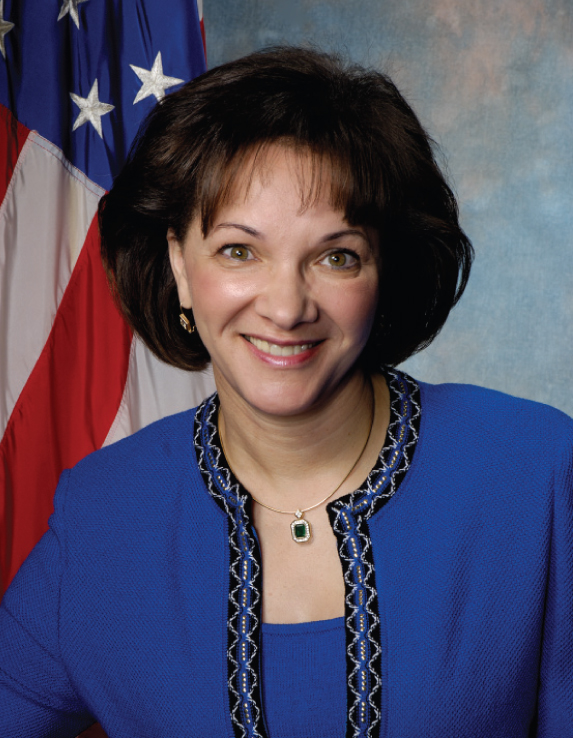
Lurita Doan

- Danny Bakewell (born 1946) – civil rights activist and entrepreneur; owner of the Bakewell Company, which includes among its holdings the New Orleans radio station WBOK and the Los Angeles Sentinel newspaper; Chairman of the National Newspaper Publishers Association
- Alvin J. Boutte (1929–2012) – founder and CEO of the largest Black-owned bank in the United States, civil rights activist, Chicago civic leader
- Robert Brevelle (born 1977) – entrepreneur, venture capitalist and professor. Councilman of the Adai Caddo Indian Nation and lineal descendant of the founders of historic Isle Brevelle, the birthplace of Louisiana Creole Culture.
- Joseph Eloi Broussard (1866–1956) – pioneer rice grower and miller in Texas
- Jean Pierre Chouteau (1758–1849) – fur trader, merchant, politician and slaveholder
- Marie Couvent (1757–1837) – philanthropist and businesswoman
- Percy Creuzot (1924–2010) – restaurateur who founded Frenchy's Chicken in Houston, Texas; due to his success, he became known as "the black Colonel Sanders"
- Constant C. Dejoie, Sr. (1881–1970) – publisher and founder of The Louisiana Weekly newspaper
- Lurita Doan (born 1958) – businesswoman, political commentator, and former political appointee; administrator of the United States General Services Administration, the government's contracting agency, 2006–2008, during the administration of Republican U.S. President George W. Bush
- Harold Doley (born 1947) – businessman
- Jean Baptiste Point du Sable (?–1818) – businessman and founder of Chicago
- Roy F. Guste – author of ten Louisiana French-Creole cuisine cookbooks; fifth-generation proprietor of New Orleans' famed Antoine's Restaurant, established in 1840
- Thomy Lafon (1810–1893) – businessman, philanthropist, and human rights activist
- Austin Leslie (1934–2005) – internationally famous New Orleans chef whose work defined "Creole Soul"
- Miriam Leslie (1836–1914) – publisher and author
- Marie Thérèse Coincoin (1742–1816) – médecine, planter, and businesswoman in Natchitoches Parish
- Baroness Micaela Almonester de Pontalba (1795–1874) – businesswoman
- Mary Ellen Pleasant (between 1814 and 1817–1904) – entrepreneur and human rights activist
- Iris Rideau (born 1937) – winemaker, businesswoman and activist
- Charles Rochon (1673–1733) – French colonist and was one of the four founders of modern-day Mobile, Alabama.
- Rosette Rochon (1767) – daughter of Pierre Rochon, a shipbuilder from a Québécois family (family name was Rocheron in Québec), and his mulâtresse slave-consort Marianne, who bore him five other children. Rochon came to speculate in real estate in the French Quarter; she eventually owned rental property, opened grocery stores, made loans, bought and sold mortgages, and owned and rented out (hired out) slaves.
- Desiree Rogers (born 1959) – former White House Social Secretary and businesswoman
- Peter A. Sarpy (1804–1865) – businessman
- Jacques Telesphore Roman (1800–1848) – businessman
- Virginie de Ternant (1818–1887) – businesswoman

=== Education ===
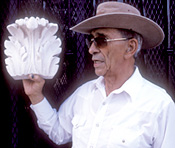
Earl Barthe

- Earl Barthe (1922–2010) – plasterer and plastering historian
- Brian J. Costello (born 1966) – historian, author, archivist and humanitarian. He is an 11th generation resident of New Roads, Louisiana, seat of Pointe Coupee Parish. He is three-quarters French and one-quarter Italian in ethnicity. He is a recognized, and one of the few remaining, speakers of Louisiana Creole French, having been immersed in childhood in the dialect spoken in Pointe Coupee Parish.
- Toi Derricotte (born 1941) – poet and professor of writing at the University of Pittsburgh
- Edouard Dessommes (1845–1908) – French language writer
- Caroline Durieux (1896–1989) – lithographer, and Professor Emeritus of Fine Arts at Louisiana State University
- Alcée Fortier (1856–1914) – late 19th-century professor of languages and folklore; influential in preservation of the French language in Louisiana
- Norman Francis (born 1931) – President of Xavier University of Louisiana
- Sheryl St. Germain (born 1954) – poet, essayist, and professor
- Andrew Jolivette – author and lecturer; associate professor in American Indian Studies and instructor in Ethnic Studies, Educational Leadership, and Race and Resistance Studies at San Francisco State University
- Sybil Kein – poet, playwright, scholar and musician
- Suzette M. Malveaux (born 1966) – Professor of Law and former Associate Dean of Academic Affairs at the Columbus School of Law, Catholic University of America
- Camille Nickerson (1888–1982) – pianist, composer, arranger, collector, and Howard University professor from 1926 to 1962
- Etnah Rochon Boutte (1880-1973) – educator, pharmacist, an activist; executive secretary of the Circle for Negro War Relief; co-founder, NAACP Anti-Lynching Crusaders
- Gilbert L. Rochon – 6th president of Tuskegee University, 2010–2013
- Neal Ferdinand Simeon (1916–1963) – mechanical engineer and teacher

=== Journalism ===
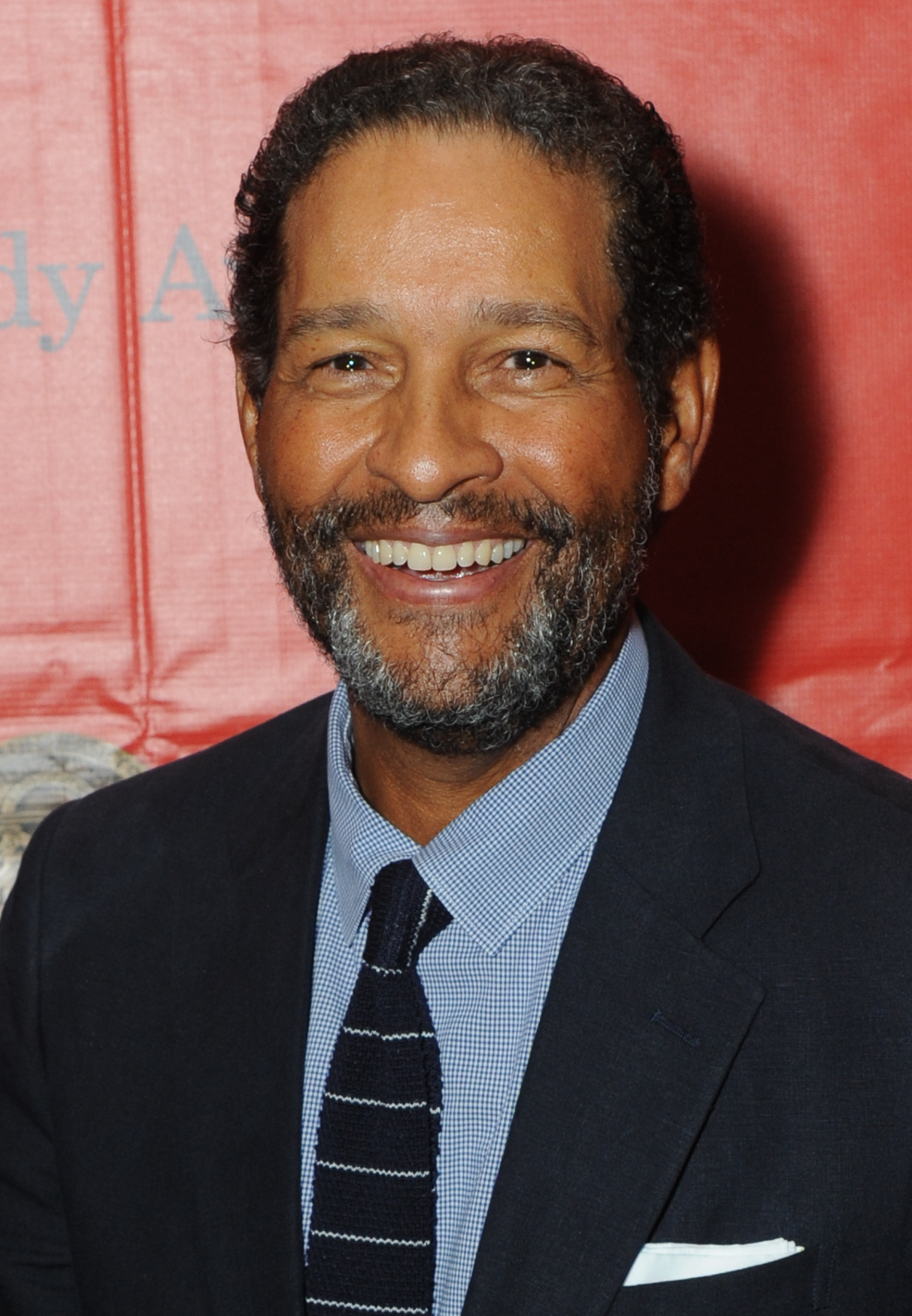
Bryant Gumbel in 2013

- Dean Baquet (born 1956) – Pulitzer Prize–winning journalist; executive editor of The New York Times
- Chris Broussard (born 1968) – sports analyst for ESPN, who mainly covers the NBA; columnist for ESPN Magazine and ESPN.com; makes appearances on ESPN's NBA Fastbreak as an analyst
- Merri Dee (born 1936) – philanthropist and former television journalist
- Bryant Gumbel (born 1948) – television journalist
- Greg Gumbel (born 1946) – television sportscaster
- Aristide Laurent (1941–2011) – publisher and LGBT civil rights advocate; co-founded The Los Angeles Advocate (now known as The Advocate) in 1967 with Sam Allen, Bill Rau, and Richard Mitch
- Charlie LeDuff (born 1966) – Pulitzer Prize-winning journalist and writer
- Don Lemon (born 1966) – television news anchor; host of CNN Tonight
- Suzanne Malveaux (born 1966) – television news reporter
- Arthel Neville (born 1962) – journalist and television personality

=== Law and politics ===
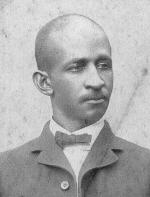
Caesar Antoine

- Caesar Antoine (1836–1921) – Lieutenant Governor of Louisiana, businessman, soldier, editor
- Larry Bagneris, Jr. (born 1946) – social and political activist from New Orleans
- Sidney Barthelemy (born 1942) – former mayor of New Orleans
- Armand Julie Beauvais (1783–1843) – 7th governor of Louisiana
- Pierre Evariste Jean-Baptiste Bossier (1797–1844) – Louisiana state senator, 1833–1843; namesake of Bossier Parish, Louisiana
- Henry Braden (1944–2013) – lawyer, lobbyist, and Democratic politician from his native New Orleans, Louisiana.
- Donna Brazile (born 1959) – author, academic, and political analyst; Vice Chairwoman of the Democratic National Committee
- Allen Broussard (1929–1996) – judge who rose to become a justice of the California Supreme Court
- LaToya Cantrell (born 1972) – current mayor of New Orleans, Louisiana
- Ward Connerly (born 1939) – former University of California regent, moderate conservative political activist, and businessman
- Don Cravins, Jr. (born 1972) – Democratic politician from the State of Louisiana
- Pierre Derbigny (1769–1829) – 6th governor of Louisiana

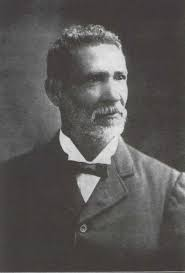
Rodolphe Desdunes

- Dan Desdunes (1870–1929) – civil rights activist and musician in New Orleans and Omaha
- Rodolphe Desdunes (1849–1928) – civil rights activist, poet, historian, journalist, and customs officer primarily active in New Orleans
- Jean Noel Destrehan (1754–1823) – politician in Louisiana and one-time owner of Destréhan Plantation, one of Louisiana's most famous antebellum historical landmarks
- Antoine Dubuclet (1810–1887) – State Treasurer of Louisiana
- Jacques Dupre (1773–1846) – 8th Governor of Louisiana
- Edwin Edwards (1927–2021) – served as the 50th governor of Louisiana for four terms (1972–1980, 1984–1988 and 1992–1996), twice as many elected terms as any other Louisiana chief executive

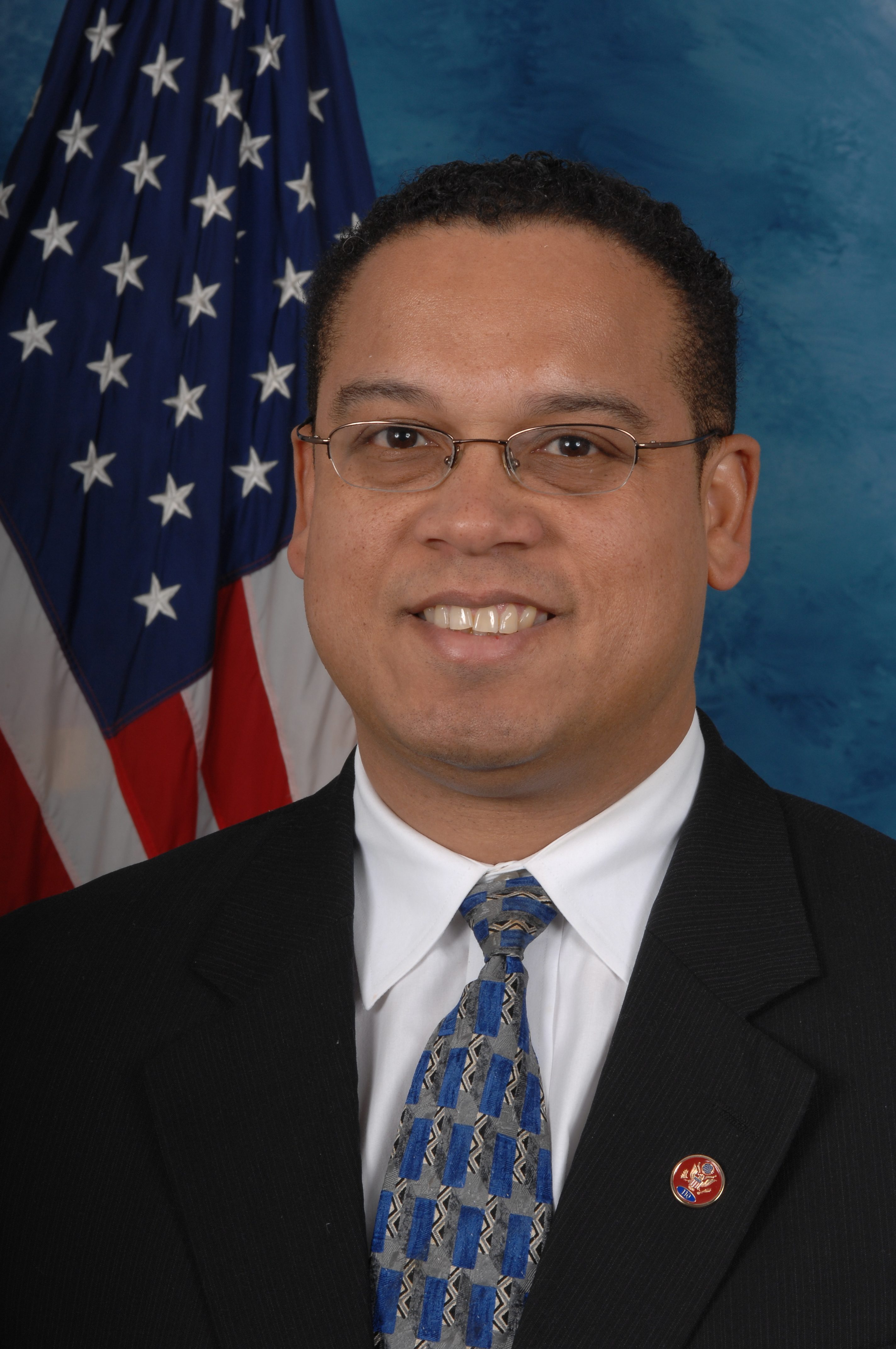
Keith Ellison

- Keith Ellison (born 1963) – U.S. Representative for Minnesota's 5th congressional district
- William Freret (1804–1864) – mayor of New Orleans, 1840–1842, and 1843–1844
- Charles Gayarré (1805–1895) – lawyer, judge, politician, historian, essayist, dramatist and novelist
- Curtis Graves (born 1938) – politician and photographer
- Paul Octave Hebert (1818–1880) – 14th Governor of Louisiana from 1853 to 1856 and a general in the Confederate Army
- Alexis Herman (born 1947) – politician; 23rd U.S. Secretary of Labor, serving under President Bill Clinton; previously Assistant to the President and Director of the White House Office of Public Engagement
- Valerie Jarrett (born 1956) – senior advisor and assistant to the president for Public Engagement and Intergovernmental Affairs for the Obama administration; lawyer and businesswoman. Jarrett is a descendant of French colonist Charles Rochon
- Paul Lafargue (1842–1911) – French revolutionary Marxist socialist journalist, literary critic, political writer and activist
- Eric LaFleur (born 1964) – Democratic member of the Louisiana State Senate; first elected in 2007; previously member of the Louisiana House of Representatives for District 38 (Evangeline and St. Landry parishes), 2000–2008; first elected without opposition to an open seat vacated by Dirk Deville; re-elected four years later in 2003 with 81% of the vote
- Mary Landrieu (born 1955) – politician, entrepreneur, and former U.S. Senator from the state of Louisiana.
- Mitch Landrieu (born 1960) – politician and lawyer who is the 61st Mayor of New Orleans. A Democrat, Landrieu served as the 51st Lieutenant Governor of Louisiana from 2004 to 2010 prior to becoming mayor.
- Moon Landrieu (1930-2022) – served as the 56th Mayor of New Orleans from 1970 to 1978. He also is a former judge. He represented New Orleans' Twelfth Ward in the Louisiana House of Representatives from 1960 to 1966 and served on the New Orleans City Council as a member at-large from 1966 to 1970.
- Pierre Caliste Landry (1841–1921) – Mayor of Donaldsonville, Louisiana
- Richard W. Leche (1898–1965) – 44th governor of Louisiana, 1936–1939

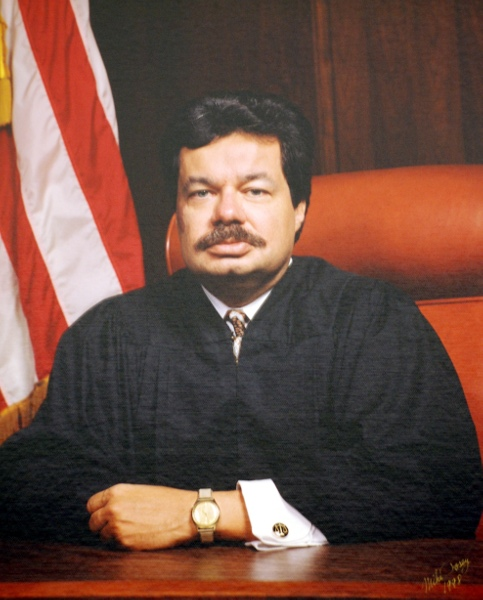
Ivan L.R. Lemelle

- Ivan L. R. Lemelle (born 1950) – United States federal judge
- Bernard de Marigny (1785–1868) – politician
- François Xavier Martin (1762–1846) – jurist and author, the first Attorney General of State of Louisiana, and longtime Justice of the Louisiana Supreme Court

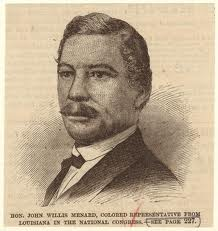
John Willis Menard

- John Willis Menard (1838–1893) – U.S. Congressman
- Ernest Nathan Morial (1929–1989) – political figure and leading civil rights advocate
- Marc Morial (born 1958) – former mayor of New Orleans; son of Ernest Nathan Morial
- Ray Nagin (born 1956) – former mayor of New Orleans
- Revius Ortique, Jr. (1924–2008) – justice of the Louisiana Supreme Court, and civil rights activist
- James Pitot (1761–1831) – second mayor of New Orleans
- Homer Plessy (1863–1925) – plaintiff in the United States Supreme Court case Plessy v. Ferguson
- Geronimo Pratt (1947–2011) – human rights activist
- Denis Prieur – 10th mayor of New Orleans
- Robert Rochon Taylor (1899–1957), housing activist and banker, first black member of the Chicago Housing Authority, namesake of the Robert Taylor Homes
- Andre B. Roman (1795–1866) – 9th governor of Louisiana, cousin of Sen. Pierre Bossier
- A.P. Tureaud (1899–1972) – attorney for the New Orleans chapter of the NAACP
- Jacques Villere (1761–1830) – 2nd governor of Louisiana
- Joseph Marshall Walker (1784–1856) – 13th governor of Louisiana, 1850–1853
- Lionel Wilson (1915–1998) – mayor of Oakland, California, serving three terms, 1977–1991
- Andrew Young (born 1932) – Congressman from Georgia's 5th congressional district, United States Ambassador to the United Nations, and mayor of Atlanta

=== Literature ===
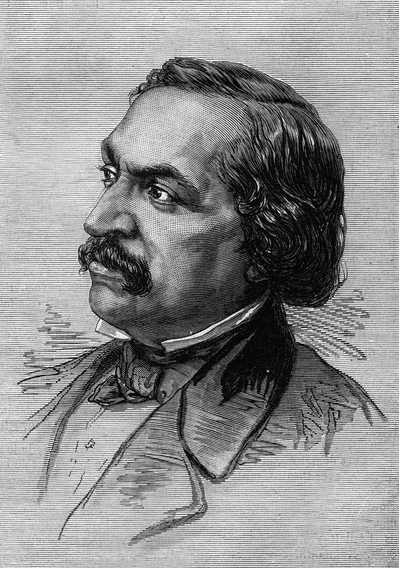
Victor Séjour

- Arna Bontemps (1902–1973) – poet; noted member of the Harlem Renaissance
- Anatole Broyard (1920–1990) – native of New Orleans, 20th-century writer and critic who worked in New York City
- Kate Chopin (1850–1904) – author, forerunner to feminism
- Marcus Bruce Christian (1900–1976) – poet, writer, historian and folklorist
- Nahshon Dion (born 1978) – award-winning creative nonfiction writer
- Sidonie de la Houssaye (1820–1894) – writer
- Adolphe Duhart (1830–1908), writer and poet
- Armand Lanusse (1810–1867) – poet and educator
- Willard Motley (1909–1965) – writer
- Alice Dunbar Nelson (1875–1935) – poet, journalist and political activist
- Anaïs Nin (1903–1977) – author
- Brenda Marie Osbey (born 1957) – poet
- John Kennedy Toole (1937–1969) – author; won a Pulitzer Prize for his Picaresque novel A Confederacy of Dunces (1980)
- Jean Toomer (1894–1967) – poet and novelist
- Victor Sejour (1817–1874) – writer
- Fatima Shaik (born 1952) – writer of children's and adult literature
- Jesmyn Ward (born 1977) – novelist and an associate professor of English at Tulane University. She won the 2011 National Book Award for Fiction and a 2012 Alex Award with her second novel Salvage the Bones, a story about familial love and community covering the 10 days preceding Hurricane Katrina, the day of the cyclone, and the day after.

=== Military ===
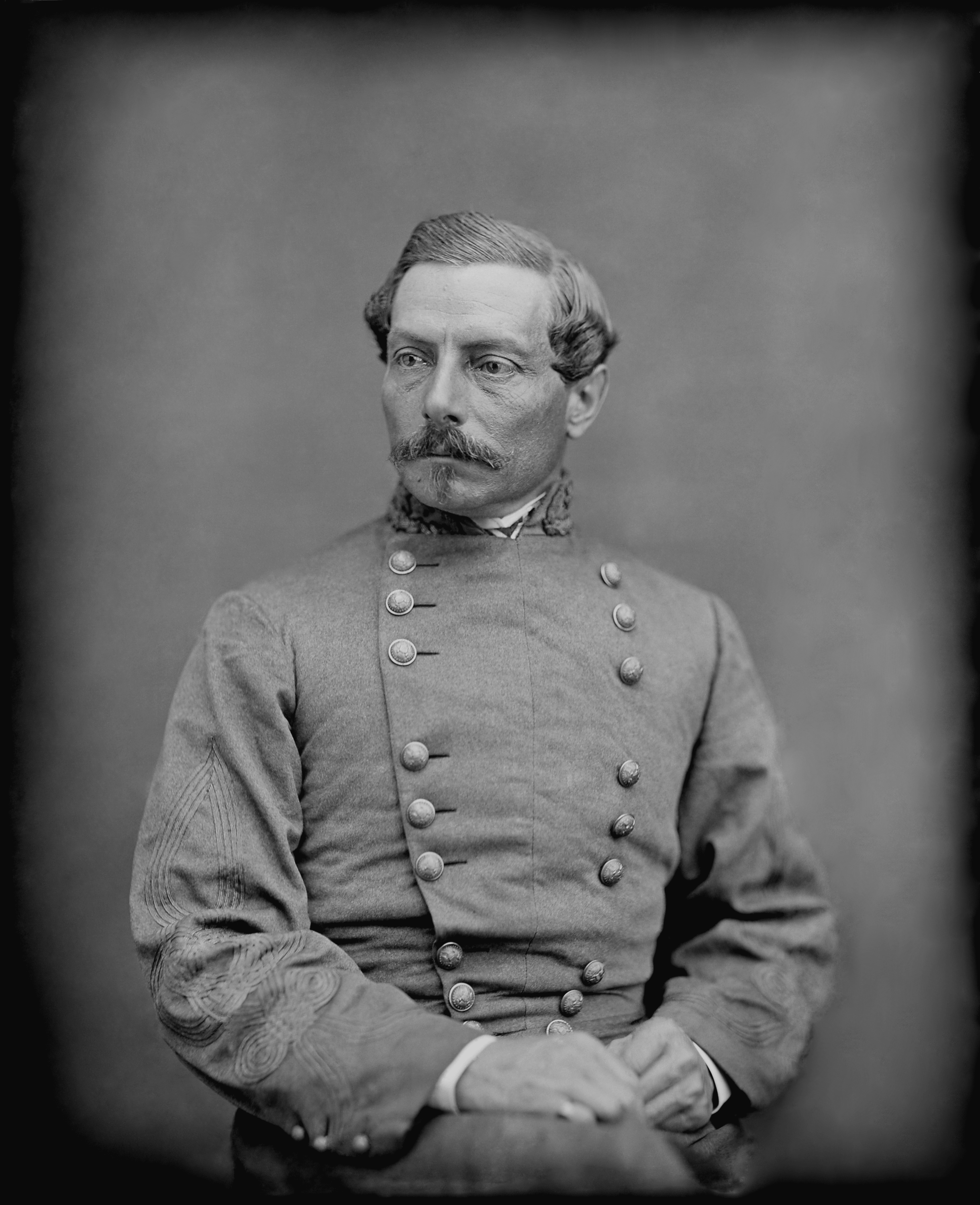
P.G.T. Beauregard

- Edward Gabriel Andre Barrett (1827–1880) – Commodore in the United States Navy
- P. G. T. Beauregard (1818–1893) – general for the Confederate States Army during the American Civil War; writer, civil servant and inventor
- Renato Beluche (1780–1860) – Venezuelan merchant and privateer
- Placide Bossier (d. 1861) – planter's son, died in Battle of Wilson's Creek
- Sherian Cadoria (born 1943) – retired General in the United States Army
- Andre Cailloux (1825–1863) – officer in the Confederate and Union armies
- Claire Lee Chennault (1893–1958) – military aviator
- J. Gary Cooper (1936–2024) – former officer of the United States Marine Corps; Assistant Secretary of the Air Force (Manpower & Reserve Affairs), 1989–1992; United States Ambassador to Jamaica, 1994–1997
- Russel L. Honoré (born 1947) – commanding general of the U.S. First Army in Fort Gillem, Georgia, and commander of Joint Task Force Katrina responsible for coordinating military relief efforts for Hurricane Katrina-affected areas across the Gulf Coast
- John A. Lejeune (1867–1942) – 13th Commandant of the Marine Corps
- Stephen W. Rochon – Rear Admiral; former Director of the Executive Residence; White House Chief Usher

=== Religion ===
Henriette DeLille

- Henriette Delille (1812–1862) – founder of the Sisters of the Holy Family, declared venerable by the Pope in 2010
- Curtis J. Guillory (born 1943) – Bishop of the Roman Catholic Diocese of Beaumont, Texas
- Marie Laveau (1794–1881) – practitioner of voodoo
- Leonard Olivier (1923–2014) – retired auxiliary bishop for the Roman Catholic Archdiocese of Washington
- Harold Robert Perry (1916–1991) – auxiliary bishop of the Archdiocese of New Orleans
- John Ricard (born 1940) – prelate of the Roman Catholic Church; fourth Bishop of the Diocese of Pensacola-Tallahassee
- Pope Leo XIV (born 1955) – first Catholic pope from the United States

=== Science and technology ===
- John James Audubon (1785–1851) – ornithologist, naturalist, and painter
- Antoine Philippe de Marigny (1721–1779) – geographer and explorer
- Paul Du Chaillu (1831–1903) – French-American traveler, zoologist, and anthropologist; became famous in the 1860s as the first modern European outsider to confirm the existence of gorillas, and later the Pygmy people of central Africa; researched the prehistory of Scandinavia
- Barthelemy Lafon (1769–1820) – notable Creole architect, engineer, city planner, and surveyor in New Orleans
- Jean Alexandre LeMat (1824–1883) – best known for the percussion cap revolver that bears his name (LeMat revolver)
- Norbert Rillieux (1806–1894) – inventor and engineer
- Jean-Louis Dolliole (1779–1861) – architect-builder in New Orleans, Louisiana

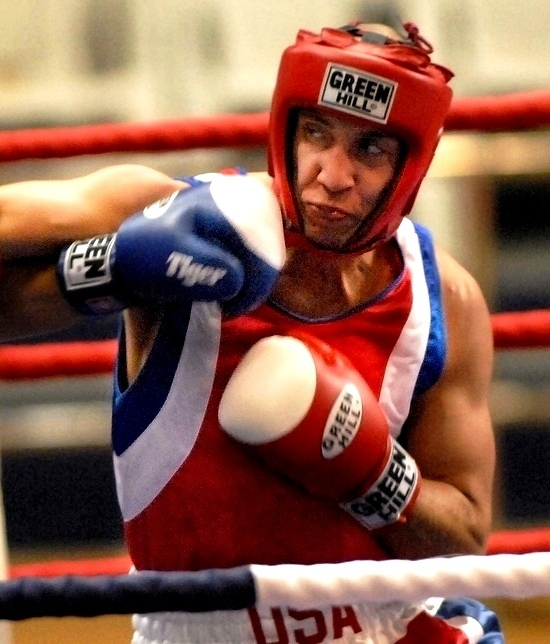
Boyd Melson

Paul Sentell

Brett Favre

=== Sports ===
- Laila Ali (born 1977) – former professional boxer who competed from 1999 to 2007; daughter of the late heavyweight champion Muhammad Ali with his third wife, Veronica Porché Ali; the eighth of her father's nine children
- Jonathan Babineaux (born 1981) – former defensive tackle for the National Football League
- Jordan Babineaux (born 1983) – former safety for the National Football League
- Daniel Cormier (born 1979) – mixed martial artist (UFC) and former Olympic wrestler
- Jimmy Doyle (1924–1947) – welterweight boxer
- Joe Dumars (born 1963) – retired basketball player in the National Basketball Association; played for the Detroit Pistons 1985–1999
- Ralph Dupas (1935–2008) – boxer from New Orleans; won the world light middleweight championship
- Brett Favre (born 1969) – Hall of Fame NFL Quarterback
- Matt Forte (born 1985) – running back for the Chicago Bears of the National Football League
- Jermaine Kearse (born 1990) – football player
- Oliver Marcelle (1895–1949) – professional baseball player
- Tyrann Mathieu (born 1992) – free safety for the Arizona Cardinals of the National Football League
- Boyd Melson (born 1981) – light middleweight boxer
- Paul Charles Morphy (1837–1884) – chess master, lawyer
- Kelly Oubre Jr. (born 1995) – professional basketball player for the Phoenix Suns of the National Basketball Association (NBA)
- Xavier Paul (born 1985) – professional baseball outfielder; has played in Major League Baseball (MLB) for the Los Angeles Dodgers, Pittsburgh Pirates, Cincinnati Reds and Arizona Diamondbacks
- Regis Prograis (born 1989) – professional boxer from New Orleans, Louisiana. Prograis is currently the WBC interim light-welterweight champion.
- Don Prudhomme (born 1941) – professional drag racer and 4-time NHRA Funny Car champion.
- CC Sabathia (born 1980) – professional baseball pitcher for the New York Yankees
- Paul Sentell (1879–1923) – professional baseball player

=== Other ===
- Charles Deslondes (1777–1811) – one of the slave leaders of the 1811 German Coast uprising, a slave revolt that began on January 8, 1811, in the Territory of Orleans
- Delphine LaLaurie (1787–1849) – socialite and murderer
- Sinnamon Love (born 1973) – pornographic actress
- Jean Saint Malo (d. 1784) – leader of a group of runaway slaves, known as maroons, in Spanish Louisiana
- Lulu White (1868–1931) – brothel madam, procuress and entrepreneur in New Orleans during the Storyville period

== See also ==
- List of Cajuns
- List of French Americans
- List of Haitian Americans
