= Couvent School =

Couvent School may refer to:

- Institute Catholique, the school for African American orphans created from Marie Couvent's desire for a school for African Americans in New Orleans and her establishing property for one in her will
- Marie C. Couvent Elementary School in New Orleans, named for Couvent
