= 1st Louisiana Native Guard (Confederate) =

Confederate Louisiana state militia unit of the American Civil War

- Flag of Louisiana, 1861
- Active: May 29, 1861–February 15, 1862 March 24-April 25, 1862 (Field officers commissioned May 29, 1861)
- Country: Confederate States of America
- Allegiance: Louisiana
- Branch: Confederate States Army
- Type: Infantry
- Size: 1,135

Commanders
- Notable commanders: Colonel Felix Labatut; Lt. Colonel Henry D. Ogden; Major S. St. Cyr

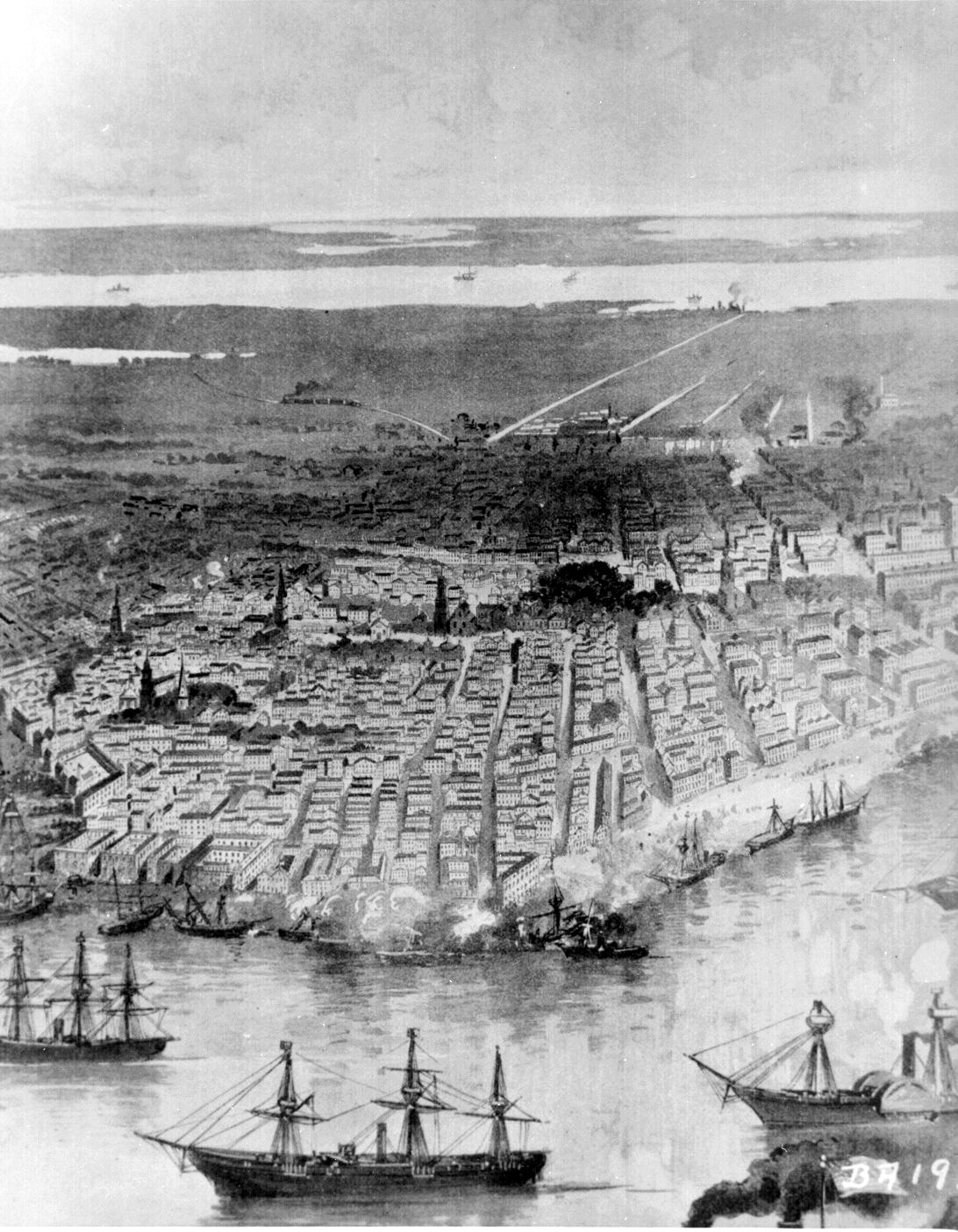
The Native Guards were on duty and at their post when Federal ships arrived opposite New Orleans, April 25, 1862

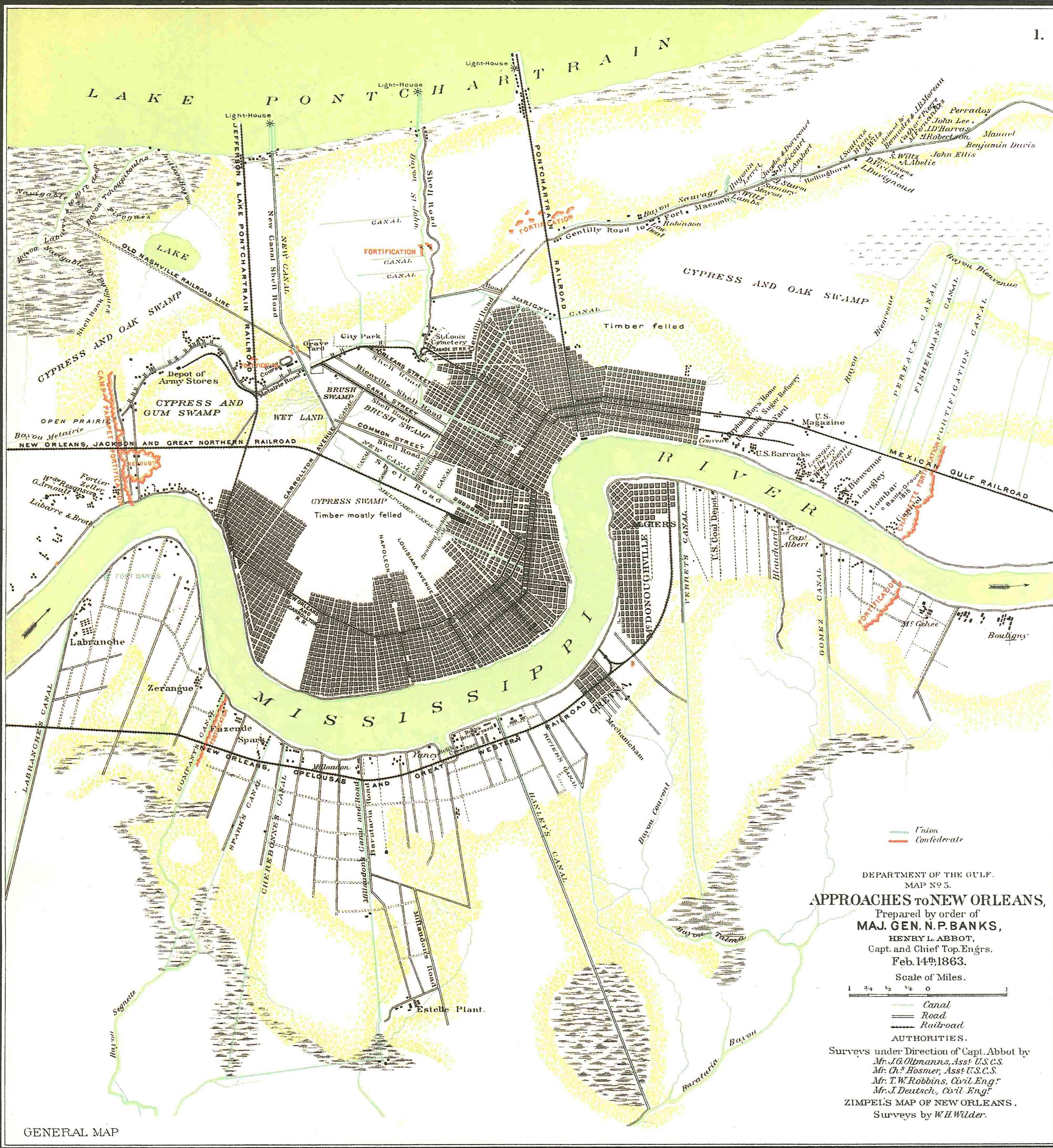
Approaches to New Orleans, Department of the Gulf Map Number 5, February 14, 1863.

The 1st Louisiana Native Guard was a Confederate Louisiana militia that consisted of Creoles of color. Formed in 1861 in New Orleans, Louisiana, it was disbanded on April 25, 1862. Some of the unit's members joined the Union Army's 1st Louisiana Native Guard, which later became the 73rd Regiment Infantry of the United States Colored Troops.

== Confederate Louisiana militia ==
Shortly after Louisiana's secession, Governor Thomas Overton Moore issued pleas for troops on April 17 and April 21, 1861. In response to the governor's request, a committee of ten prominent New Orleanian Creoles of color called a meeting at the Catholic Institute on April 22. About two thousand people attended the meeting where muster lists were opened, with about 1,500 gens de couleur signing up. Governor Moore accepted the services of these men as part of the state's militia.

The new militia regiment was formed during May 1861, consisting mostly of French-speaking Creoles of color. While some members of the new regiment came from wealthy prominent Creole families, a majority of the men were clerks, artisans, and skilled laborers. Louisiana and New Orleans had an estimated 25,000 Creole of color residents.

On May 29, 1861, Governor Moore appointed three white officers as commanders of the regiment, and company commanders were appointed from among the Creoles of the regiment. The militia unit was the first of any in North America to have officers of color, preceding the United States Colored Troops. This regiment was called the Louisiana Native Guard. Ten percent of its members would join the Union Army's 1st Louisiana Native Guard.

== Activities ==
The Native Guards were volunteers, and as such supplied their own arms and uniforms. These were displayed in a grand review of troops in New Orleans on November 23, 1861, and again on January 8, 1862. They offered their services to escort Union prisoners (captured at the First Battle of Bull Run) through New Orleans. Confederate General David Twiggs declined the offer, but thanked them for the "promptness with which they answered the call". The Louisiana State Legislature passed a law in January 1862 that reorganized the militia into only “...free white males capable of bearing arms... ”

The Native Guards regiment was forced to disband on February 15, 1862, when the new law took effect. "Their demise was only temporary, however, for Governor Moore reinstated the Native Guards on March 24 after the U.S. Navy under Admiral David G. Farragut entered the Mississippi River." As the regular Confederate forces under Major General Mansfield Lovell abandoned New Orleans, the militia units were left to fend for themselves. The Native Guards were again, and in finality, ordered to disband by General John L. Lewis, of the Louisiana Militia, on April 25, 1862, as Federal ships arrived opposite the city. General Lewis cautioned them to hide their arms and uniforms before returning home.

== Notable members ==
- Felix Labatut (Colonel)- State senator, soldier, and signer of Louisiana's declaration of secession.
- Armand Lanusse (Captain)- Soldier, educator, writer. The prime motivator in the formation of the Native Guards Regiment.
- André Cailloux, who later became a hero of the Siege of Port Hudson as a Union officer, served as a lieutenant in this Confederate Louisiana militia regiment of the Native Guard.
- Morris W. Morris (Lieutenant) - he was a Jamaican-born immigrant who briefly served as an officer in the Confederate Louisiana militia regiment and subsequently served for six weeks in the Union Native Guard regiment. He was unique in that he was of Jewish ancestry, making him both the only black Jewish Confederate officer and the only black Jewish Union officer. He was the grandfather of Joan and Constance Bennett, as well as the great-grandfather of Morton Downey, Jr.

== Companies ==
Companies of the Confederate 1st Louisiana Native Guard prior to disbanding in 1862:

Company name	Commander	Peak Strength	Notes
Native Guards	Capt. St. Albin Sauvinet	85 men	
Savary Native Guards	Capt. Joseph Joly	85 men	
Beauregard Native Guards	Capt. Louis Golis	52 men	
Young Creole Native Guards	Capt. Ludger B. Boquille	76 men	
Labatut Native Guards	Capt. Edgar C. Davis	110 men	
Mississippi Native Guards	Capt. Marcelle Dupart	64 men	
Economy Native Guards	Capt. Henry Louis Rey	100 men	
Meschacebe Native Guards	Capt. Armand Lanusse	90 men	
Order Native Guards	Capt. Charles Sentmanat	90 men	
Crescent City Native Guards	Capt. Virgil Bonseigneur	63 men	
Perseverance Native Guards	Capt. Noel J. Bacchus	60 men	
Louisiana Native Guards	Capt. Louis Lainez	75 men	
Ogden Native Guards	Capt. Alcide Lewis	85 men	a.k.a. Turcos Native Guards
Plauche Guards	Capt. Jordan Noble	100 men	
Total		1,135 men	

== See also ==
- List of Louisiana Confederate Civil War units
- Military history of African Americans in the American Civil War
