= Marie C. Couvent Elementary School =

School in New Orleans, Louisiana

Marie C. Couvent Elementary was a historic elementary school in New Orleans, Louisiana named for Marie Couvent. The school was renamed in 1997 to A. P. Tureaud Elementary School because Couvent had owned slaves. It closed in 2013.

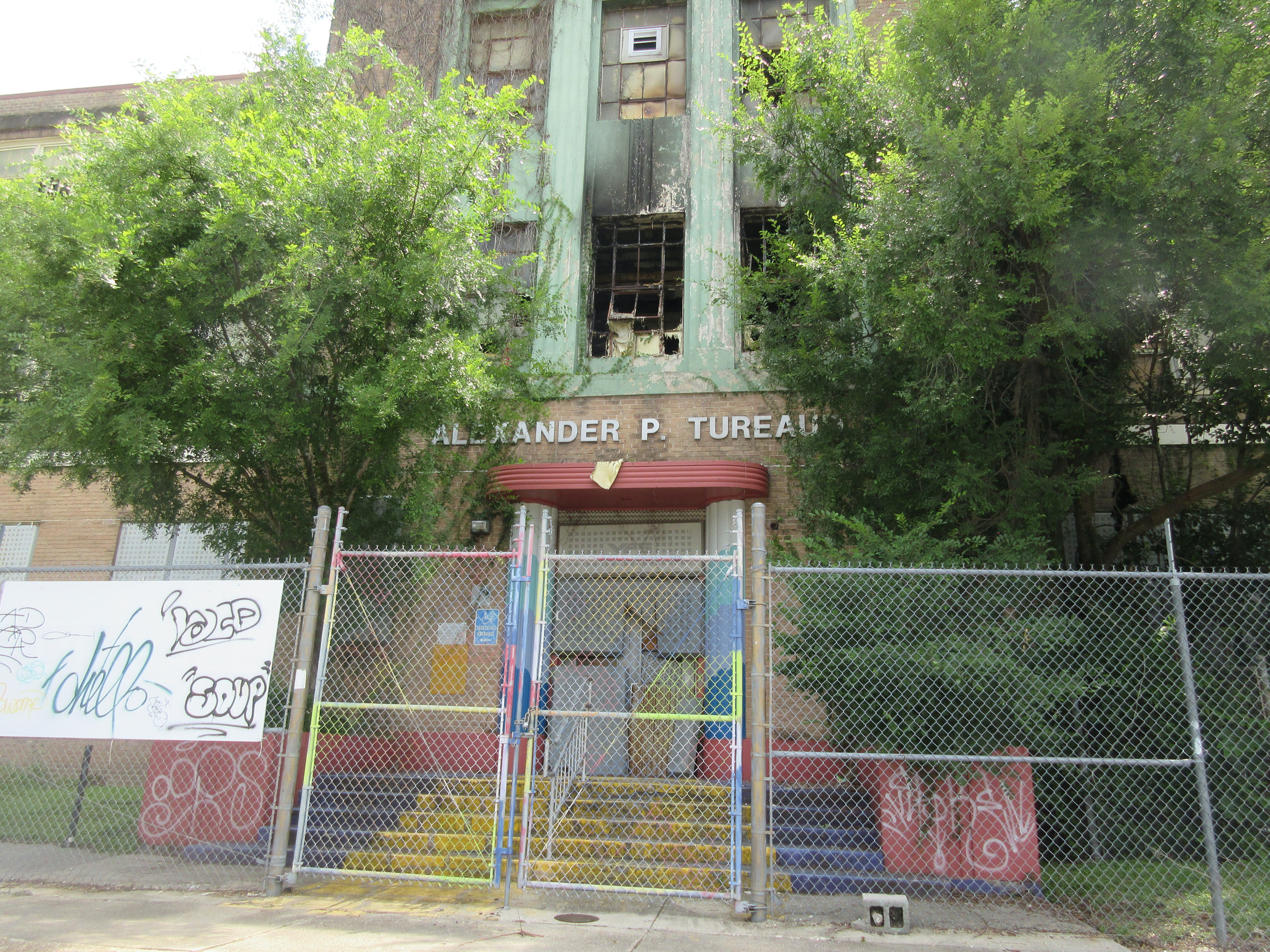
Alexander P. Tureaud School building still derelict in May 2026

== History ==
The school was built in 1940 in Faubourg Marigny and originally named Marigny Elementary School. It was later renamed for Marie Couvent, an African American former slave who married successful African American businessman Bernard Couvent and deeded property for the Institute Catholique.

In 1989 Sun Ra performed in front of the school.

In the 1990s a campaign was launched to rename city public schools that venerated slaveholders. Since Couvent and her husband owned slaves, and the school changed its name in 1997 to A. P. Tureaud Elementary School for A.P. Tureaud.

The school closed in 2013.
