= Institut Catholique =

Institut Catholique may refer to:

- Institut Catholique de Paris
- Institute Catholique a school for orphans in New Orleans
