= Armand Lanusse =

American Louisiana Creole educator, poet, and writer

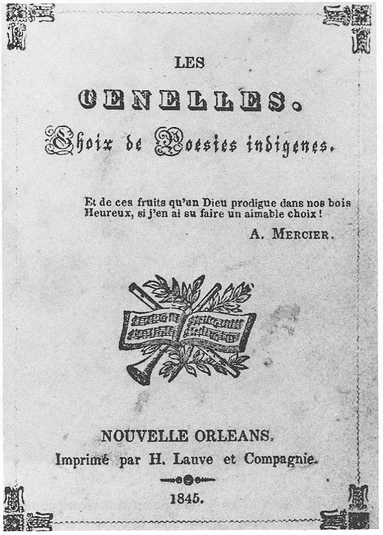
A copy of Les Cenelles from 1845

Armand Lanusse (c. 1810 – March 16, 1868) was a Creole of color, educator, poet, and writer from New Orleans, Louisiana. He is the editor of Les Cenelles (1845), a collection of poems by fellow Creoles of color in New Orleans widely considered to be the first African-American poetry anthology published in the United States. He also served as the founder and director of the Catholic Institute for Indigent Orphans from 1852 to 1867.

== Biography ==
=== Early life ===
Lanusse was born in New Orleans in 1812. The nature and location of Lanusse's education is a topic that is widely debated by literary historians. According to Rodolphe Desdunes in his book Nos hommes et notre histoire, Lanusse received his entire education in New Orleans and did not travel to France. However, other historians believe Lanusse, like many other Créoles de couleur libres of his time, studied for a period of time in Paris. Lanusse is said to have taken enjoyment in the study of French classic literature and the linguistic complexities of the French language.

=== L'Institut Catholique ===
Lanusse founded the Catholic Institute for Indigent Orphans in 1848. Much of the funds for creating the school came from the will of Marie Couvent, a Black philanthropist who had set aside a portion of her inheritance to go towards building a school for Catholic orphans in New Orleans. As a tribute to her, each year Lanusse arranged a religious memorial with his pupils. Many of the students came from poor and underprivileged backgrounds, and they graduated as individuals highly trained in the fields of literature, business, arts, and civics. As part of their education, the children were required to create presentations annually to show their progress, and their parents were invited. Lanusse is said to have treated all of his pupils equally and never favored children based on their class backgrounds and their abilities to pay school fees. Lanusse became the principal in 1852, and he remained in that role until his death. Lanusse was highly successful in his role as principal, and he built a reputation for the institute. According to Desdunes, the school eliminated the necessity for Creoles of color to seek education abroad in Europe.

=== Civil War and later life ===
During the Civil War, Lanusse served as a captain in the First Louisiana Native Guard in the Confederate Army and opposed the Union occupation of New Orleans. His refusal to fly the Union flag over the Catholic Institute led to his censure by the Union military government.

The treatment of Black Americans following the Civil War led him to become pessimistic in his hopes for racial equality. Lanusse renounced his allegiance to the Confederacy and began to believe that Creoles would be unable to build a better future for themselves separate from other people of color in the United States. According to Desdunes, despite passing as white, Lanusse never tried to hide or deny his African heritage and identity as a Creole of color and "encouraged his people to love their fellow men." Lanusse died on March 16, 1868, following a "short and painful illness."

== Poetry style and context ==
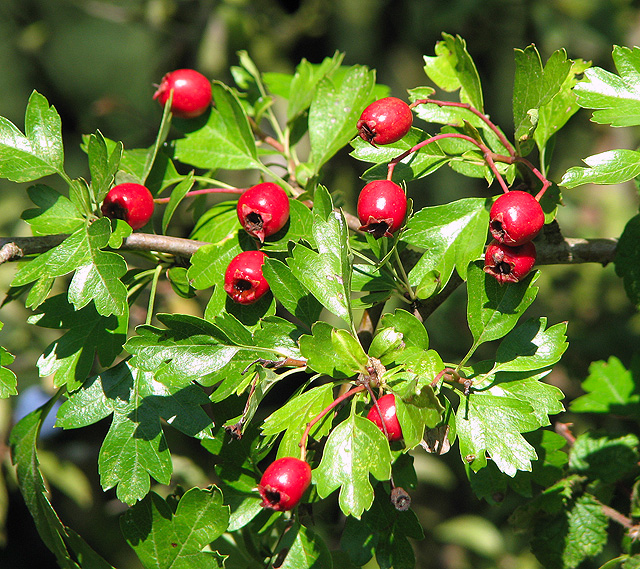
The cenelle, or hawthorn berry, after which Les Cenelles was named

The poetry of Lanusse and others in Les Cenelles is best understood within the context of the complexities of Creole identity in antebellum New Orleans. Creoles of color in New Orleans, due to their mixed racial heritage from the French colonial history of plaçage, occupied a position somewhere in between the boundaries of Black and white. They were not enslaved and were often more affluent than free Black Americans (some Creoles even held slaves), but they did not enjoy the same freedoms as whites in New Orleans. Furthermore, despite living in the anglophone culture of the United States, their culture and language was predominately French. Lanusse's poetry must also be understood through the laws and legal restrictions on Creoles of color at the time. In 1830, a law was passed by the state of Louisiana that banned the publishing of material that could sow discontent and rebelliousness among the state's free people of color or enslaved population, under penalty of life imprisonment or death. The authors of Les Cenelles had to walk an extremely fine line in order to avoid legal trouble.

The poetry of Lanusse and others in Les Cenelles reflects heavy influence from Romanticism. Typical of French Romantic poetry, the authors of Les Cenelles searched for escapism through nature and the idealized past. Escape, fantasy, individualism, melancholy, love, suicide and death, nature, and faith are all common themes of the poetry in Les Cenelles. Much of the poetry also includes affirmations of the poets' beliefs in Catholicism, as well as references to Catholic themes and imagery.

There is disagreement among literary historians and critics as to whether Les Cenelles should be considered to be within the field of African American literature. Some scholars, such as Henry Louis Gates Jr., argue that Les Cenelles is "the first attempt to define a Black canon." They cite Lanusse's introduction, which states his desire for Creole poetry to provide a pathway towards racial progress. The apolitical poetry of Les Cenelles, according to Gates, seeks a political purpose (the end of racism) through its adoption of French Romantic poetry styles. By imitating famous French writers of the time, the authors are imploring their broader audience to treat them like white French people. However, other scholars argue that Les Cenelles is separate from other works of African American literature due to the differing positionalities of Creoles of color and African Americans. Many cultural traits possessed by Creoles of color, including their French language and heritage, Catholicism, and oftentimes greater accumulations of wealth separated them from other Black Americans. These cultural elements are highly present in the poems of Les Cenelles.
