= Placide Bossier =

American from Louisiana who died in the American Civil War

Placide Bossier was an American from Louisiana who died in the American Civil War. A Catholic Creole person who lived a privileged life in high society, for Clement Eaton he exemplified that lifestyle, "a gay life of parties, hunting, fishing, dancing, serenades, and constant fishing".

Bossier came from Louisiana, the Natchitoches area, and was a Catholic Creole; historian Clement Eaton described him as a "young Creole of fashion". He attended Georgetown University in 1850-1851. Around 1860, he briefly kept a diary (written in English, and corrected by the family's governess); apparently the study of law bored him, and he spent his time in a rocking chair, thinking about billiards, dinner parties, and the woman he was in love with. The American Civil War was approaching and he exercised with a cavalry company. In January 1861 he voted to secede.

Bossier joined the 3rd Louisiana Infantry Regiment (Confederate). He was killed on the morning of August 10, 1861, during the Battle of Wilson's Creek, and died shortly after being wounded. His friend and cousin Alphonse Prud'homme, likewise the son of a slaveholding planter, described his death, and said he met his fate "like a man and a Christian". News of his death reached his friend in Maryland, James Ryder Randall, that same month. Randall, who attended Georgetown University with Bossier, wrote a poem named for Bossier in his honor, comparing him to a Crusading knight and citing the motto of Pierre Terrail, seigneur de Bayard, "sans peur et sans reproche". Father Pierre Dicharry, a chaplain, gathered a lock of Bossier's hair in his prayer book, and brought it back home.
