= Earl Barthé =

American plasterer (1922–2010)

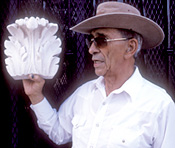

Earl Barthé (June 6, 1922 – January 11, 2010; last name pronounced bar-THAY) was an American plasterer and plastering historian. A self-described "Creole of Color", Barthé is particularly admired for preserving many of the old plaster walls and ornamental cornices for historic structures within New Orleans. His family company specializes in historical and decorative plasterwork and the Barthé family has been plastering since 1850.

The Barthé family settled in New Orleans in the early 19th century and the family business was established by Barthé's great-great-grandfather, a master plasterer from Nice, France, who married a woman from Haiti. The family was known in the term of the time as "free people of color." Over the years, the family has worked on many historic buildings. Most of the fine hotels and old stores along Canal Street as well as the mansions and the cemeteries' tombs on St. Charles Avenue include work by Barthé and his family. Barthé's father worked on such historic buildings as the Saint Louis Cathedral, the French Market, and the Saenger Theater. Barthé has also worked on several notable projects and is known for decorative plaster and stucco work that reflects an array of French, Spanish, Anglo-American neo-classical, and African American aesthetics, in sync with the historic architecture of New Orleans. For his work, Barthé was inducted into the Louisiana AFL-CIO Labor Hall of Fame. Today, Barthé's daughter, Terry Barthé, leads the family business.

In 2001, Barthé was documented as part of the New Orleans Building Arts Project which culminated in an exhibit of his work along with other New Orleans trade artists entitled, Raised to the Trade: Creole Building Arts in New Orleans. The exhibit toured throughout the United States including presentations at the New Orleans Museum of Art and the Smithsonian Institution's Folklife Festival. He was a recipient of a 2005 National Heritage Fellowship awarded by the National Endowment for the Arts, which is the United States government's highest honor in the folk and traditional arts. In his final years, Barthé spent much of his time helping to restore historic buildings in New Orleans that were damaged or destroyed in Hurricane Katrina.
