= Clement Eaton =

American historian

- Born: February 23, 1898; Winston-Salem, North Carolina
- Died: August 12, 1980 (aged 82)
- Education: University of North Carolina; Harvard University
- Awards: Guggenheim Fellowship, three Fulbright scholarships
- Scientific career
- Fields: Southern history
- Workplaces: Lafayette College; University of Kentucky

Clement Eaton (23 February 1898 in Winston-Salem, North Carolina – 12 August 1980) was an American historian who specialized in the American South.

Eaton received his education from the University of North Carolina, where he was president of Phi Beta Kappa, and graduated in 1919. He also attended Harvard University. He was chair of the History Department at Lafayette College from 1931 to 1942, and then a faculty member of the University of Kentucky.

== Selected writings ==
- Freedom of Thought in the Old South (1940, revised and enlarged in 1964 under the title The Freedom-of-Thought Struggle in the Old South)
- A History of the Old South: The Emergence of a Reluctant Nation (1949)
- A History of the Southern Confederacy (Macmillan, 1954)
- Henry Clay and the Art of American Politics (1957)
- The Growth of Southern Civilization, 1790-1860 (1961)
- The Mind of the Old South (1964)
- The Waning of the Old South Civilization 1860-1880 (University of Georgia Press, 1969)
- Jefferson Davis (1977)
