= Deacon John Moore =

American musician

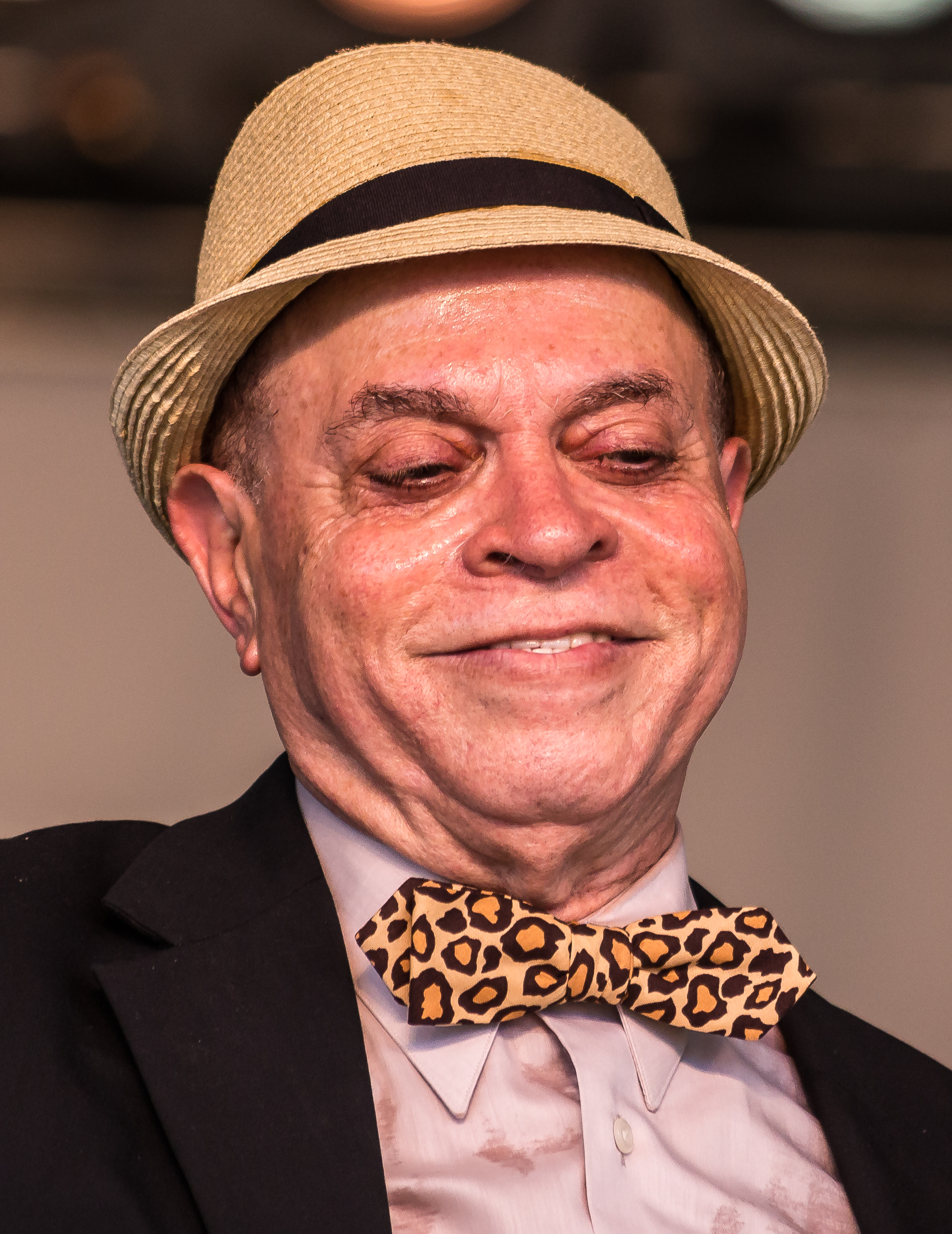
- Moore at the Richmond Folk Festival 2015

Background information
- Born: John Moore; June 23, 1941 (age 85)
- Origin: New Orleans, Louisiana
- Genres: Blues, Rhythm and Blues
- Occupations: Musician, bandleader, actor
- Instruments: Vocals, guitar, tambourine
- Years active: 1950s –
- Labels: Minit Records, RedBone Records, Vetter Communications
- Website: Deacon John's Jump Blues

John "Deacon John" Moore (born June 23, 1941) is a blues, rhythm and blues and rock and roll musician, singer, actor, and bandleader. Moore was given the name "Deacon" by one of his band members.

== Biography ==
Moore grew up in New Orleans' 8th Ward. He plays guitar and is the brother of the Creole scholar Sybil Kein. He is a cradle Catholic. His daughter is the publisher Lisa C. Moore.

He was active on the New Orleans R&B scene since his teens, and became a session man on many hit recordings of the late 1950s and the 1960s, including those by Allen Toussaint, Irma Thomas, Lee Dorsey, Ernie K-Doe, and others.

His band The Ivories, which performed at New Orleans' Dew Drop Inn, attracted a following. While highly regarded locally and by fellow musicians, lack of hit records under his own name kept him from the national fame.

In 2000 Moore was inducted into the Louisiana Blues Hall of Fame.

He is featured in the documentary segment Going Back to New Orleans: The Deacon John Film and the concert CD, Deacon John's Jump Blues (2003).

As of 2024 he remains a local favorite on the New Orleans music scene. On July 25, 2006 Moore became president of the local branch of the American Federation of Musicians.

On April 10, 2007, Moore's son Keith was shot and killed at the age of 42, in New Orleans. Keith was locally famous in New Orleans as ambient noise artist, Jambox Pyramid, and member of the punk band Manchild. In addition, Keith co-founded the experimental music event Noizefest in 2005 with local producer Sir Stephen, as an alternative, modern addition to the Jazzfest festivities.

In January 2008, Deacon John was selected to close the Inauguration of Louisiana Governor Bobby Jindal by performing "God Bless America" with the 156th Army Band and a Navy fly-over of jets, and later headline the Governor's Inaugural Ball.

In 2008, in ceremonies and performance at the New Orleans Center for Creative Arts, Deacon John was inducted into The Louisiana Music Hall of Fame.

=== Acting career ===
Moore had his first taste of acting 1987 by appearing in the horror film Angel Heart. Moore did not appear on the big screen again until 2013 when he had a cameo in another horror film, The Last Exorcism Part II. Moore also guest starred in a few episodes of Treme during 2010.

== Discography ==
- 1990 Singer of Song (Singer of Song)
- 1999 Live at the New Orleans Jazz & Heritage Festival 1994 (RedBone)
- 2003 Deacon John's Jump Blues (Vetter) CD & DVD

== Filmography ==
Year	Title	Role	Notes
2013	The Last Exorcism Part II	Old Bluesman	
2010	Treme	Danny Nelson	3 episodes
1987	Angel Heart	Toots Sweet Band – Lead Guitar	
