= Sherian Cadoria =

United States Army general

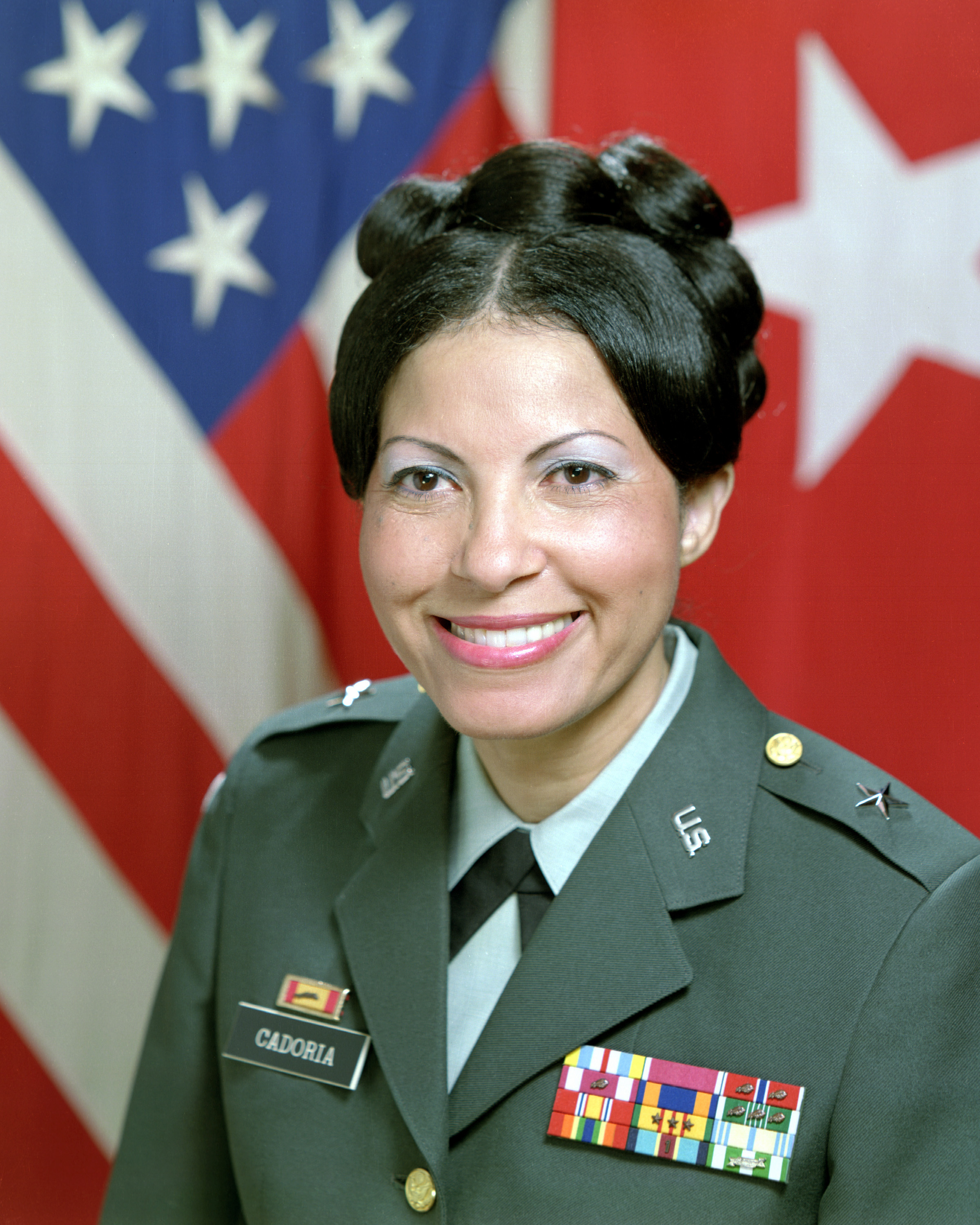
- Sherian Grace Cadoria
- Born: January 26, 1940 (age 86); Marksville, Louisiana, U.S.
- Military career
- Allegiance: United States
- Branch: United States Army
- Service years: 1961–1990
- Rank: Brigadier General
- Nickname: Sheree
- Commands: 1st Region Criminal investigation Command; Military Police Student Battalion
- Conflicts: Vietnam War
- Awards: Defense Superior Service Medal; Legion of Merit; Bronze Star Medal (3); Meritorious Service Medal (2); Air Medal; Army Commendation Medal (4)

Sherian Grace Cadoria (born January 26, 1940) is a retired United States Army officer. She became the first African-American woman to achieve general officer rank in the regular United States Army on promotion to brigadier general in 1985. She was the highest ranking black woman in the military at the time of her retirement in 1990. Cadoria is a 1961 graduate of Southern University and A&M College in Baton Rouge, Louisiana with a Bachelor of Science degree in Business Education, and holds a Master of Arts degree in Social Work from the University of Oklahoma. Initially in the Women's Army Corps, she transferred to the Military Police Corps in the 1970s.
