= Jules Lion =

French-born American photographer (c. 1809–1866)

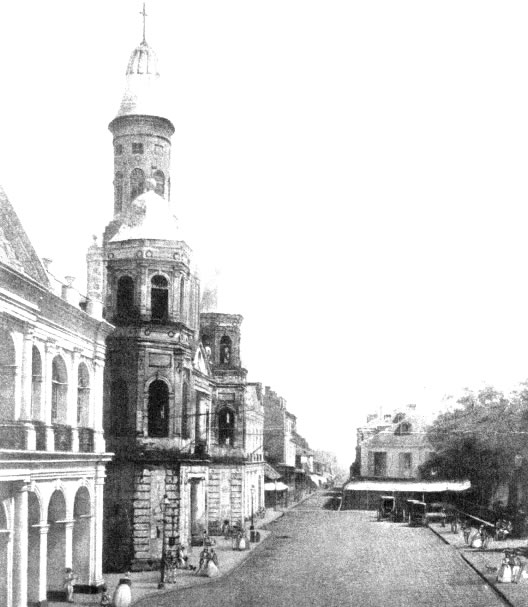
St. Louis Cathedral at Jackson Square, New Orleans. 1842 lithograph based on own daguerreotype by Jules Lion

Jules Lion (c. 1806–1866) was a photographer, lithographer, and pastel painter born in Paris, who exhibited at the Paris Salon before emigrating to the United States in 1837. He eventually opened a daguerreotype studio in New Orleans in 1840, one year after the invention of the process. On March 14, 1840, the New Orleans Bee published a notice about an exhibition of Lion's daguerreotypes at the St. Charles Museum, the first documented photography exhibition in Louisiana. Lion "became one of the first in America to draw a lithograph directly from a daguerreotype."

While Lion, is listed as a free man of color in six commercial city directories, all other documents civic, legal, and in newspapers and the diocese omit any racial designation which was odd for 19th-century New Orleans. He introduced "the process", also painted, and his main focus was a series of lithographed portraits of prominent Louisianans and people connected to Louisiana history, including John James Audubon and Andrew Jackson. His most notable work is a pastel depicting the "first painting known to American art history in which a white man openly displays affection for his black child." Lion taught art at the Louisiana College and, late in his life, created lithographed Confederate sheet music covers.
