= Sybil Kein =

American writer and musician (1939–2022)

- Born: Consuela Marie Moore; September 29, 1939
- Died: October 28, 2022 (aged 83)
- Occupations: Poet; playwright; scholar; musician
- Relatives: Deacon John Moore (brother)

Sybil Kein, also known as Consuela Provost (born Consuela Marie Moore; September 29, 1939 – October 28, 2022), was a Louisiana Creole poet, playwright, scholar, and musician. She largely created the field of Creole Studies through her early publications and presentations.

== Biography ==
Provost was born Consuela Marie Moore on September 29, 1939. Raised in a Catholic family, she was the sister of well-known Louisiana musician Deacon John Moore.

Kein largely created the field of Creole Studies through her early publications and presentations. A protégé of Robert Hayden, her poetry is housed in the National Archives, Library of Congress. In 1981 Provost published Gombo People, a volume of poetry representing the first contribution to American letters of original literature in the Louisiana Creole language.

Provost has been named "Chercheur Associe" of the Sorbonne in Paris, France for her work in Creole culture; and distinguished "Professeur Émérite" of The University of Michigan. She was also the recipient of a Hopwood Award.

Her later works included Delta Dancer, Serenade Creole, Creole Journal, Creole: The History and Legacy of Louisiana‘s Free People of Color, An American South, Creole Ballads, Zydeco, Maw-Maw’s Creole Lullaby and Other Songs for Children, Creole Classique, Love is Forever: Songs of Romantic New Orleans, Gombo People and Gardenias y Rosas: Canciones Romanticas (a musical companion to Gumbo People).

Provost resided in Natchitoches, Louisiana later in life and died in October 2022.
