= Thomy Lafon =

Philanthropist from New Orleans, Louisiana (1810–1893)

Thomy Lafon (December 28, 1810 – December 22, 1893) was a Creole of color teacher, businessman, and philanthropist in New Orleans.

== Biography ==
He was born free on December 28, 1810, to a mixed-race, francophone family. His mother, Modeste Foucher, was a mistress of Barthelemy Lafon, though Thomy's father was Pierre Larande.

He started out selling cakes to workers, opened a small store, was a school teacher for a time, and became successful at money lending and real estate investment. He was an opponent of slavery and supported racial integration in schools.

He is mostly known for his large donations to the Institute Catholique, the Louisiana Association for the Benefit of Colored Orphans, and other charities for both blacks and whites. In his will, he left funds to local charities and to the Charity Hospital, Lafon Old Folks Home, Straight University, and the Sisters of the Holy Family, an order of African-American nuns founded in New Orleans. Lafon also supported the Tribune, the first black-owned newspaper in the South after the American Civil War.

The Thomy Lafon school was called "the best Negro schoolhouse in Louisiana," but it was burned down by a white mob during the New Orleans Robert Charles riots of 1900.

Lafon never married, and died on December 22, 1893. He is interred at the Saint Louis Cemetery No. 3.

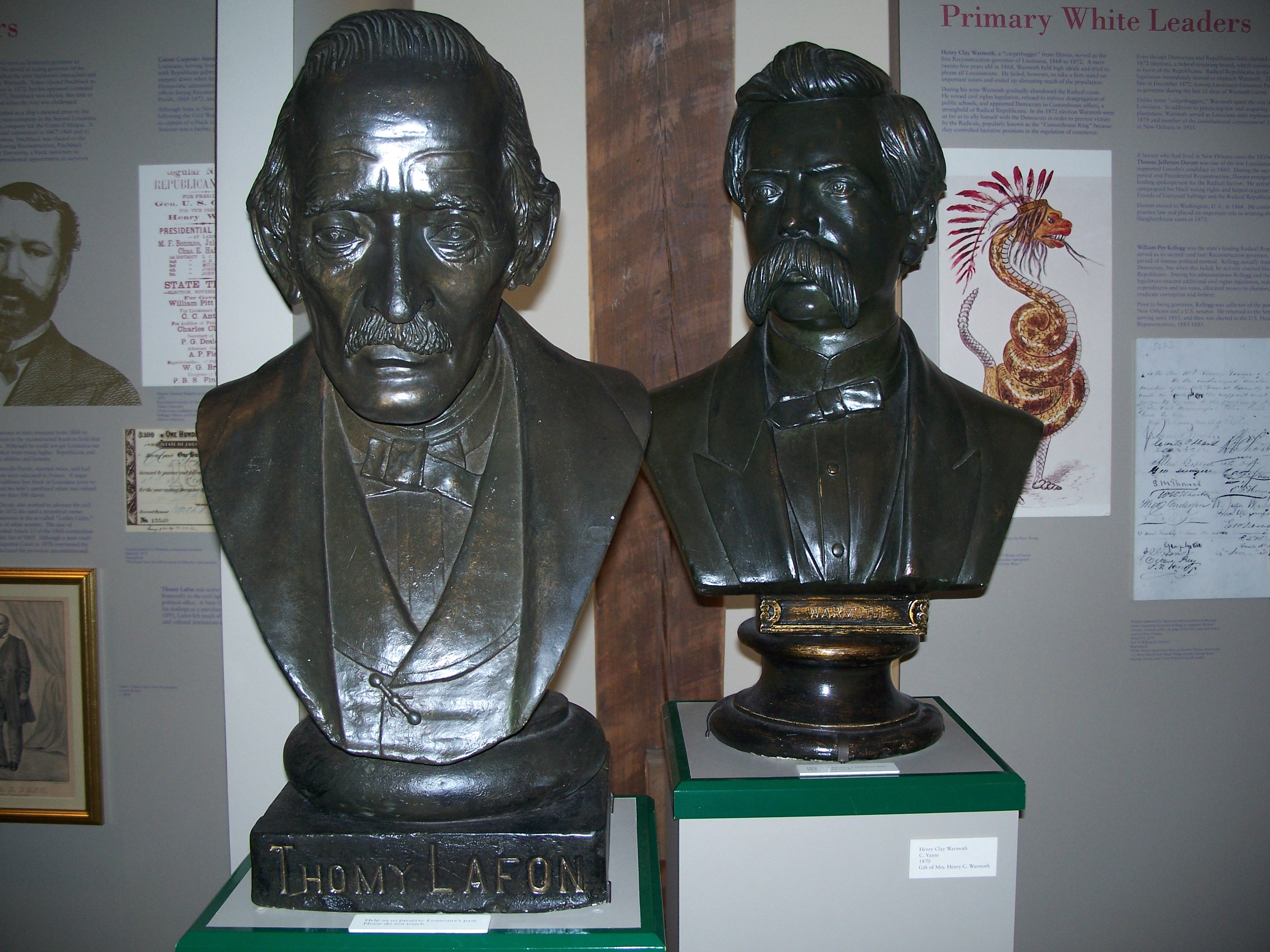
Bust of Thomy Lafon (at left)
