= Jordan Bankston Noble =

African American soldier and public figure

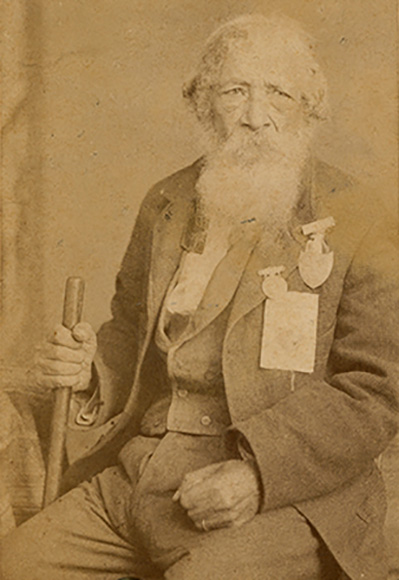
- Noble in 1886
- Born: October 14, 1800; Augusta, Georgia
- Died: June 20, 1890 (aged 89); New Orleans, Louisiana
- Other names: The Drummer Boy of Chalmette, Old Jordan
- Occupations: Soldier, public figure

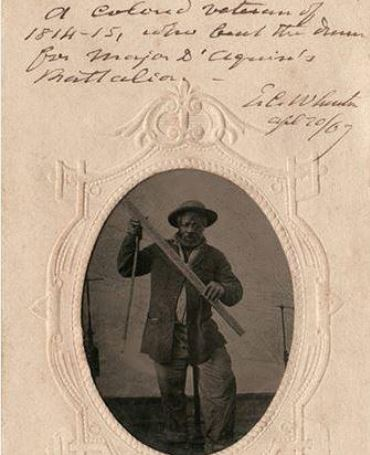
Jordan B. Noble, photograph date unknown

Jordan Bankston Noble also known as Jordan B. Noble (October 14, 1800 – June 20, 1890) was an African American soldier and public figure who is best known for his role as a military drummer in the Battle of New Orleans during the War of 1812. Noble's drum played a crucial role in relaying his commander's orders during the surprise assault against the British forces on December 23, 1814, and the main British advance on January 8, 1815. Jordan Noble also served in the Seminole Wars, Mexican-American War under Zachary Taylor, and the American Civil War for the Union.

== Early life ==
Jordan Noble was born in Augusta, Georgia on October 14, 1800, to African and European parents. Although there are no records of who his parents were, it is known that Jordan Noble was born into slavery and was looked after by his mother, who was also a slave. In 1811, he and his mother moved to New Orleans, and took up residence in the old Spanish Barracks. Shortly after, the young Jordan Noble enlisted in the United States Army.

== Military service ==
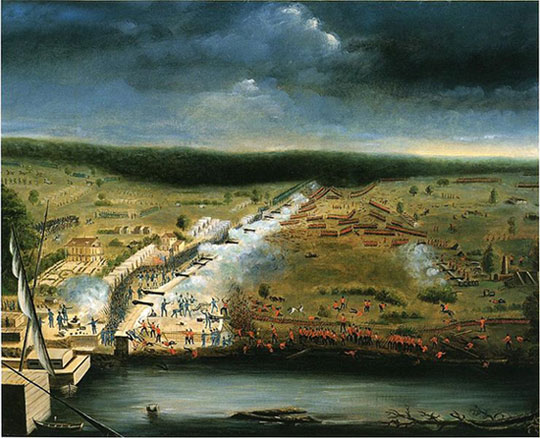
Jordan B. Noble participated in the Battle of New Orleans

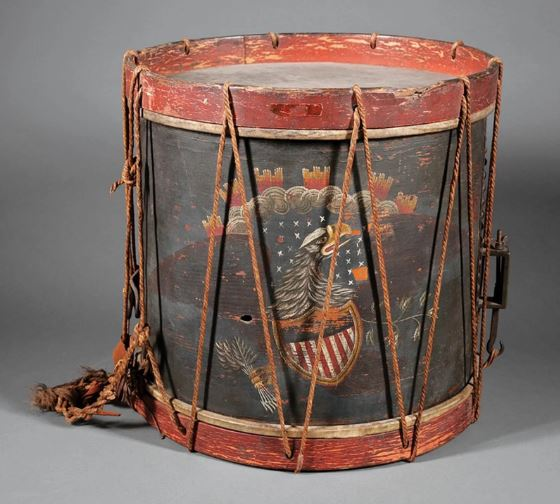
Drum used by Jordan B. Noble as a drummer in the Battle of New Orleans

=== The War of 1812 ===
At the age of 13, he was sold to Lieutenant John Noble of the 7th Infantry. At 14, Jordan Noble joined the United States Army's 7th Infantry Regiment in 1812, as a drummer. Military drummers in early American warfare were used to convey orders, and in the fog of war, it was their drumbeats that informed soldiers what to do next.

==== The Battle of New Orleans ====
The first firefight of the Battle of New Orleans took place on the evening of December 23, 1814. The British forces, led by Admiral Alexander Cochrane and General John Keane landed just outside of New Orleans, Louisiana, where they decided to make camp for the night. As the British troops set up camp and waited for the remainder of their forces to join them, Major General Andrew Jackson used this opportunity to launch a surprise attack by water and land. Although one of the units that participated in the American land assault was Major D'Aquin's Battalion of Free Men of Color, a militia unit, Jordan Noble was not among them. He, an enslaved man, was serving as a regular in the US Army's 7th Infantry Regiment.

On January 8, 1815, the British launched their main and final assault on the American forces defending New Orleans. During the battle, young Noble held his position and continued the beat on his drum. In the confusion of the battle, this let the troops know what needed to be done, and that the American force was still successfully defending the city. This was the final battle of the War of 1812, as the Treaty of Ghent had recently been signed and was on its way to the United States, from Europe, to be ratified.

==== Military career after the War of 1812 ====
After the Battle of New Orleans and the War of 1812, Jordan B. Noble went on to serve in the Seminole Wars, Mexican-American War under Zachary Taylor, and the American Civil War for the Union. His role in the Civil War was due to his extreme patriotism. At the outbreak of the Civil War, Jordan Noble raised a company of freed African Americans but, like all other black companies in the South, were never mustered into Confederate service. After the fall of the city to Admiral Farragut on 25 April 1862, the Native Guard served for a short time as provosts maintaining order in the city until General Butler landed on 1 May and disbanded the unit. Later, Jordan Noble raised a company and served as a Lieutenant for a short time in the 2nd Regiment of the Louisiana Native Guard in the U.S. Army.

== Later life and death ==
After his military career ended, Jordan B. Noble continued to be a prominent fixture in New Orleans culture. He would participate in parades, be seen around town playing the same drum he used in the Battle of New Orleans and would even recreate the famous drumbeat that was heard during battle. After the Battle of New Orleans, Jordan earned the nickname "The Drummer Boy of Chalmette", and in his later years was referred to as "Old Jordan". Jordan B. Noble died on June 20, 1890. A local newspaper, The Daily Picayune featured "Old Jordan" in an article on June 21, 1890, the day after his death.
