= Julien Hudson =

American painter (1811–1844)

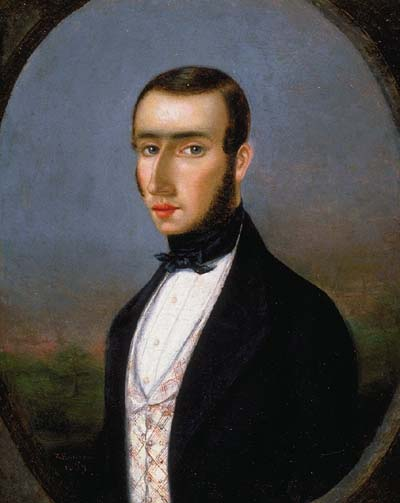
- Portrait of a Man, So-Called Self Portrait by Julien Hudson, New Orleans, 1839
- Born: January 9, 1811; New Orleans, United States of America
- Died: 1844; New Orleans, United States of America
- Occupation: Painter

Julien Hudson (January 9, 1811 – 1844) was a 19th-century free man of color who lived in New Orleans. He was a successful painter and art teacher. He was thought to be the first African American by whom a self-portrait is known. However, the Louisiana State Museum currently refers to the 1839 oil-on-canvas portrait as Portrait of a Man, So-Called Self Portrait.

== Biography ==
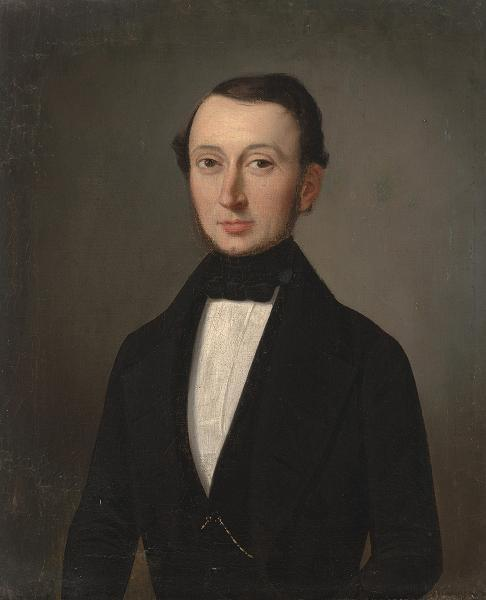
Portrait of a Creole Gentleman, 1835–1387, Dallas Museum of Art

Julien Hudson was born on January 9, 1811, in New Orleans. His father, John Thomas Hudson, was a British ship chandler and ironmonger. His mother, Suzanne Désirée Marcos, was a free New Orleans quadroon. Hudson's racial identity had been a matter of scrutiny for some years. He is first listed in the city directory in 1838 without the designation of "free man of color." The following year, "f.m.c." was included. Hudson's father apparently did not live with the family after 1822, but his mother had investments in real estate and had a steady income. Hudson may have been educated at home on Bienville Street near Bourbon Street. Within the family, Julien was known by the nickname "Pickil."

After a two-year apprenticeship to tailor Erasme Logoaster in the mid-1820s, Hudson began working with the husband and wife team of miniature painters Antoine Meucci and Nina Meucci at their studio on the corner of Royal and St. Peters Streets. Julien Hudson's apprenticeship with the Meuccis (1826–1827) lasted less than six months, as the Meuccis left New Orleans for Cuba, and later Bogotá, Colombia. In 1829, Hudson's grandmother, Françoise Leclerc, left him at least $100 of a $7,000 estate that included three slaves. Little is known of Hudson's activities until June 1831, when he advertised in The New Orleans Bee that he had undergone a "complete course of studies" with Antoine Meucci. In August, Hudson applied for a passport to sail to Liverpool, and by December informed readers of The Louisiana Courier that he "lately had returned from Paris." With whom he studied during this trip is not known.

Hudson traveled again to Paris to study, presumably with neoclassical painter Alexandre-Denis Abel de Pujol (1785–1861), a student of Jacques-Louis David and winner of the Prix de Rome in 1811. Hudson's second trip may have begun in 1835 and by August 16, 1837, he was back in New Orleans. Hudson's return was most probably prompted by the financial Panic of 1837, which began on May 10, as well as by the death of his sisters.

After returning to New Orleans, Hudson opened his own studio on 120 Bienville Street in 1831, though he appears in city directories as an artist only in the years 1837–1838. For a brief time in 1840, Hudson had a student, George David Coulon (1822–1904).

Julien Hudson died in 1844 in New Orleans.

== Bibliography ==
- Brady, Patricia (1995). "A Mixed Palette: Free Artists of Color of Antebellum New Orleans". The International Review of African American Art: 19th Century African American Fine and Craft Arts of the South. 12 (3). Virginia: Hampton University Museum: 5–8.
- Driskell, David C. (1976). Two Centuries of Black American Art [exhibition catalog]. Los Angeles: Los Angeles County Museum of Art. ISBN 9780875870700.
- Greenwald, Erin M., ed. (2010). In Search of Julien Hudson: Free Artist of Color in Pre–Civil War New Orleans. New Orleans: The Historic New Orleans Collection. ISBN 978-0-917860-57-7.
