= Marie Couvent =

American philanthropist (c.1757–1837)

Marie Gabriel Bernard Couvent (c. 1757 – June 28, 1837), also known as Justin Fervin, and Marie Justine Cirnaire, was an African-American philanthropist in New Orleans. She is best known for dedicating the property that would be used to construct the Institute Catholique.

== Biography ==
=== Early life ===
Marie Couvent was born in Guinea (in West Africa), a name that was often used to describe the west coast of Africa in this period. In her will, Couvent testifies that she was shipped to the French colony of Saint-Domingue as an enslaved person around the age of seven. Because of this, she lacked any memory of her parents and received no formal education. Throughout her entire life, she could neither read nor write.

=== Move to New Orleans ===
Couvent obtained her freedom and later lived in New Orleans, although the events that led to these changes, and their dates, remain unknown. She likely escaped during the Haitian Revolution. In New Orleans, she married Gabriel Bernard Couvent, a free black man and carpenter. Together, they lived on Barracks Street in the lower French Quarter, and accumulated land and other properties.

=== Slaves ===
The Couvents enslaved several people throughout their lives but petitioned the Orleans parish government to grant freedom to three of them. In 1821, Marie and her husband petitioned for the freedom of an enslaved woman named Pauline. In 1829, Bernard petitioned for the freedom of two other enslaved women, Seraphine and Fillette. However, Bernard died on May 22 before they were freed. In 1831, Marie refiled the petition, stating that the women had served her well and nursed her in times of illness.

=== Will ===
In her 70s, Marie Couvent informed Fr. Constatine Maenhaut (sometimes written Manehault), a priest at St. Louis Cathedral in New Orleans, of her desire to help found a school for Black orphans. Couvent, a devout Catholic, considered Maenhaut to be a spiritual mentor. In 1832, she recorded her final will. It read, in part:

I bequeath and order that my land at the corner of Grands Hommes and Union streets [now Dauphine and Touro] be dedicated and used in perpetuity for the establishment of a free school for the colored orphans of the district of Marigny. ...

Maenhaut and the future clergy of the cathedral were entrusted with supervising this will and its aims. Henry Fletcher, a friend of Bernard Couvent, was tasked with executing the terms of the will.

=== Death ===
Marie Couvent died on June 28, 1837, at about 80.

== School ==
The school she had hoped to establish in her will was not built until almost a decade after her death. Fletcher had failed to construct it, primarily due to opposition from city officials.

Maenhaut then set about trying to construct the school himself and enlisted the aid of a man named Francois Lacroix. Lacroix aided in the foundation of the Society for the Instruction of Indigent Orphans, which raised funds and sued to gain access to Marie Couvent's property. They succeeded in winning their court case in 1846, and the school finally opened in 1848, eleven years after Marie Couvent's death.
