= Institute Catholique =

Catholic school in New Orleans, Louisiana

The Institute Catholique, also known as L'Institut Catholique des orphelins indigents (Catholic Institute for Indigent Orphans) and the Couvent School, was a Catholic school founded in New Orleans in 1840. It mainly served the non-orphan children of free people of color, who paid a modest tuition, and was founded with funds from Marie Couvent.

== History ==
1867 photograph of Mademoiselle Lecene, an excellent student who was honored as a "laureate" of the Institute Catholique in that year

=== Antebellum period ===
The school was financed from a trust established in the will of Madame Marie Couvent, the African-born widow of Bernard Couvent, one of the most commercially successful free men of color in New Orleans. The concept of educating African-Americans was opposed by some members of the white community in New Orleans, and the establishment of the trust for the school was challenged in court. The widow died in 1837, and when the original executor of the will failed to forcefully implement its terms, a group of ten leading Afro-Creole intellectuals residing in New Orleans formed The Catholic Institute for the Instruction of Indigent Orphans. This group successfully sued in court to obtain control of the widow's estate. The courts did not finally rule in favor of this group until 1846.

The charter authorizing the Institute Catholique to function as a corporation was received from the state of Louisiana in 1847, and the school opened in 1848, renting facilities in the Faubourg Marigny neighborhood just downriver from the French Quarter while awaiting construction of a permanent building on the land donated by Madame Couvent. Félice Coulon Cailloux, wife of André Cailloux, later a hero in the American Civil War, initially served as the principal of the school while it operated in temporary quarters.

By 1850, the city of New Orleans had a population of approximately 150,000. Of this population, 15,000 were free people of color, and 15,000 were slaves. The city had a three tier social structure, at the top of which were free whites, in the middle were free people of color, and at the bottom were slaves. Free people of color could own property, own businesses, and enter contracts, but could not vote, marry whites, or send their children to the public schools of the city, which were established in 1841. This rankled the French inspired republican idealism of the Afro-Creole intelligentsia, many of whom had been educated in France.

The permanent building of the Institute Catholique was completed in 1852. The Afro-Creole poet Armand Lanusse (1810–1867), editor of and contributor to Les Cenelles, a book of French poetry written by Afro-Creoles, who had been instrumental in the founding of the school and was one of the ten original board members, was named headmaster in 1852. He continued in that capacity until his death in 1867.

André Cailloux and his wife, Félicie Coulon Cailloux, were active supporters of the school throughout the 1850s, sending all three of their surviving children there for instruction. Félicie continued to work at the Institute for several years after Lanusse became headmaster, and was responsible for the well-being of the 75 young orphan girls who attended.

Though the school's property and building were provided for in the will of Madame Couvent, the income generated from the real estate included in her estate was insufficient to cover annual operating expenses. The gap was made up through charitable contributions from several mutual aid societies established within the Afro-Creole community of New Orleans. The Friends of Order, an Afro-Creole mutual aid society of which Cailloux was a member, organized an annual contribution collected by its members at the cemeteries of New Orleans each year on All Soul's Day (November 2). Other mutual aid societies held annual charity balls. Occasionally, the school received small appropriations from the City of New Orleans and the State of Louisiana.

Average annual enrollment during the 1850s was approximately 300.

=== Postbellum period ===
The school continued in operation after the American Civil War. In 1866, Harper's New Monthly Magazine contained a positive story about the school, its teachers, and its students. During this period, the Institute maintained its position as the intellectual center of the Afro-Creole community of New Orleans.

All of the faculty members were Afro-Creoles, many of whom were educated in France. Paul Trevigne (1824–1907), editor of the French language Afro-Creole newspaper L'Union (1862–1864), a publication that advocated abolition and complete equality for African-Americans and the first African-American owned and operated newspaper in the American South, was a teacher there for 40 years.

In 1893, when Afro-Creole philanthropist Thomy LaFon, the financial backer of the famous Plessy v. Ferguson lawsuit, died, he left a bequest to the school in his will for the construction of a new building. Arthur Esteves, President of the Board of Directors of the Institute Catholique, was one of the men who brought the Plessy lawsuit into litigation.

=== 20th century ===
==== Holy Redeemer era ====
In 1915, that school was destroyed by a hurricane. Lacking funds to rebuild, the Board of the Institute Catholique agreed to terms proposed by Sister Katharine Drexel, founder of Xavier University. She offered to build and operate a new school on the site, under the name St. Louis School of Holy Redeemer parish on the condition that it would be operated by the Sisters of the Holy Ghost. At the same time, a church, the Holy Redeemer Church, was built in the neighborhood, and the school, commonly referred to as Holy Redeemer, operated as an elementary school for the local parish, which was operated by the Josephites.

During this period, the teachers of the school no longer formed the intellectual center of the Afro-Creole community. In effect, though a school continued to operate at the location, the Institute Catholique, operated and staffed by African-Americans, ceased to exist. Ernest "Dutch" Morial, the first African-American Mayor of New Orleans, attended Holy Redeemer Elementary School during this period.

In 1965 Hurricane Besty destroyed the Holy Redeemer Church, but the Holy Redeemer Elementary School continued to operate. Graduates of that elementary school included the author Keith Weldon Medley, whose book on the Plessy vs. Ferguson lawsuit was published in 2003. The school continued in operation until 1993, when it closed due to lack of funds.

=== Successors ===
==== Bishop Perry Middle School ====
The same year as the closure, the Bishop Perry Middle School for Boys, a free school operated by the Society of St. Edmund opened on the site. The school served students in the 6th, 7th, and 8th grades, primarily of African-American heritage. Enrollment ranged from 60 to 200 students.

Bishop Perry was forced to shut down its operations in August, 2006, a victim of the economic losses of Hurricane Katrina. In addition, some of the families of students did not return to New Orleans after the evacuation caused by the Hurricane Katrina flooding. The building itself did not suffer great damage from the storm and subsequent flooding.

From its founding in 1846 until today, the school and its successors have been located at 1941 Dauphine Street in New Orleans. Four buildings have been located on the lot, the last of which was built in 1956. The building is owned by the Diocese of New Orleans and was rented from the Diocese by the Society of St. Edmund during the 12 years it operated Bishop Perry Middle School.

==== St Gerard Majella Alternative School ====
In October 2006, the building became home to the St. Gerard Majella Alternative School. Operated by the Society of the Sisters of Notre Dame, this alternative school was designed to provide ongoing education to young women of high school age who are pregnant. That school closed in 2012.

As of 2019, the Roman Catholic Archdiocese of New Orleans was seeking to acquire the property.

== Notable alumni ==
- Rodolphe Desdunes

== Books ==
- Bell, Carolyn Cossé. Revolution, Romanticism, and the Afro-Creole Protest Tradition in Louisiana, 1718-1868. Baton Rouge: Louisiana State University Press, 2003.
- Desdunes, Rodolphe Lucien. Our People and Our History: Fifty Creole Portraits. Baton Rouge: Louisiana State University Press, 1973, Translated from the 1911 French original by Sister Dorothy Olga McCants.
- Medley, Keith W. We As Free Men: Plessy v. Ferguson. Gretna, LA: Pelican Publishing, 2003.
- Medley, Keith W. The Will of the Widow Couvent, Preservation in Print, 1999.
- Ochs, Stephen. A Black Patriot and a White Priest. Baton Rouge: Louisiana State University Press, 2001.
