= Hilma Burt =

American brothel owner

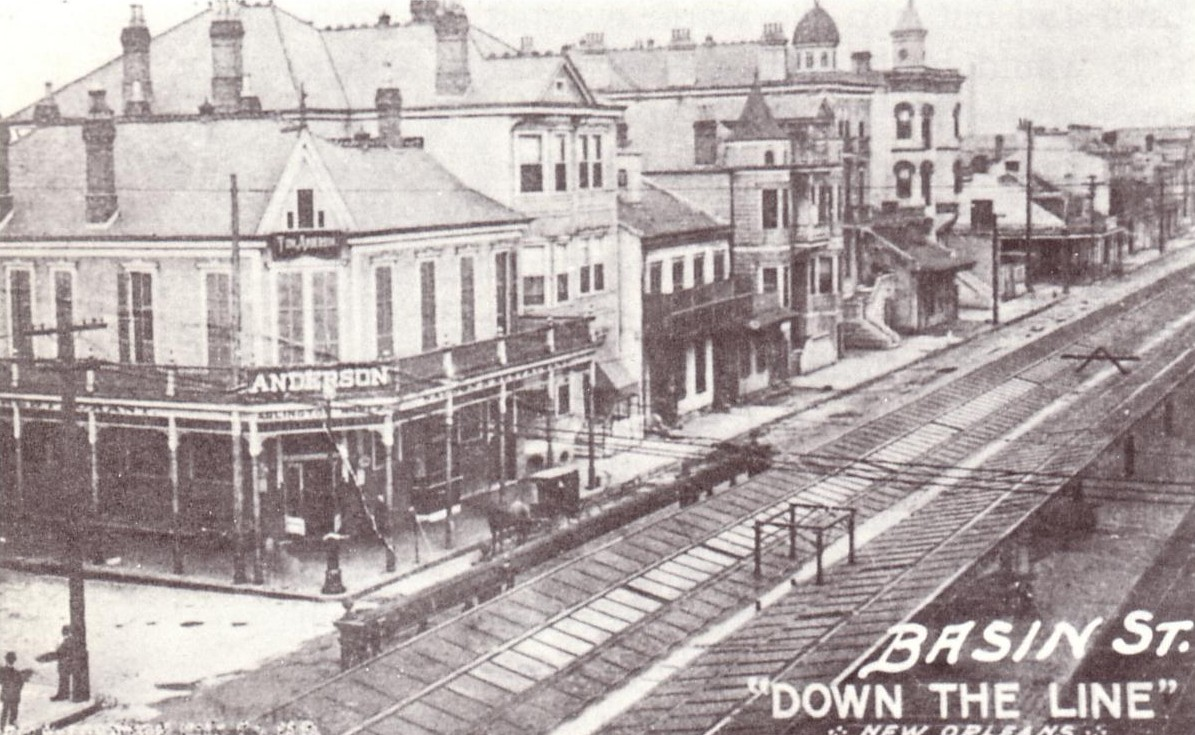
Basin Street, New Orleans c.1909. Anderson's saloon is on the left and Hilma Burt's brothel is the adjacent building. The other buildings on the block are, left to right, the brothels of Diana & Norma, Lisette Smith, Minnie White, Josie Arlington (with rounded cupola), Martha Clarke (smaller older building), Lulu White's Mahogany Hall (with pointed cupola) and Lulu White's Saloon

Hilma Burt (sometimes misspelled Helma or Hilda Burthe or Burtte) was an American brothel madam in Storyville, New Orleans, Louisiana during the early twentieth century. This area, originally known as "The District", permitted legalized prostitution from 1897 to 1917 and became possibly the best known area for prostitution in the nation.

== Brothel ==
Burt was mistress to political boss and 4th Ward Representative to the State Legislature (1904-1920), Tom Anderson. Burt had replaced fellow brothel madam Josie Arlington as Anderson's mistress. It is said that Anderson helped Burt finance her purchase of Flo Meeker's Place in Basin Street. The brothel was located at no. 209, next door to Anderson's establishment, the Fair Play Saloon.

The brothel, a three-story stone building, was one of the most luxurious in the area. It was known for its mirrored ballroom, with a piano on which musicians played. The ladies of the house, dressed in ball gowns, were introduced to the clients in this room. At the rear was a parlour where the more important clients were entertained. The house had an opulent library with hand bound rare editions and a collection of international erotica.

Burt had strict rules that the women working there had to follow. Swearing, smoking, and heavy drinking were forbidden, with fines of $5 for each curse word and $10 for getting drunk. The brothel became busy after 10 pm. By midnight on a good night, there were twelve to twenty clients in the parlours, and by 2 am, all the bedrooms would be occupied with other clients waiting.

In the early 1900s, a Blue Book could be purchased for 25 cents. Blue Books were created for tourists and those unfamiliar with this area of New Orleans and contained, in alphabetical order, the names of all the prostitutes of Storyville. Landladies would be identified in bold font and information about popular houses, including interior and exterior pictures, was included. In the 1909 edition, Burt's house was described as "a palace second to none".

The grandeur of the brothel faded over the years and it finally shut down when the district was closed in 1917.

=== Jelly Roll Morton ===
The composer and pianist Jelly Roll Morton was employed by Burt, while still a youth, to entertain customers. The customers would tip the piano player and Morton considered it a bad night if he received less than a hundred dollars in tips.

=== Pretty Baby ===
The plot of the 1978 Louis Malle film Pretty Baby, starring Brooke Shields, Keith Carradine and Susan Sarandon, was based on the life of Violet, a "trick baby" (fathered by a client), who was born in the attic of Burt's house.

== Bibliography ==
- Gill, James (1997). Lords of Misrule: Mardi Gras and the Politics of Race in New Orleans. Univ. Press of Mississippi. ISBN 978-1-60473-638-0.
- Kent, Leticia (April 16, 1978). "Malle: 'Pretty Baby' Could Be Called 'The Apprenticeship of Corruption'". The New York Times.
- Lomax, Alan (1950). Mister Jelly Roll: the fortunes of Jelly Roll Morton, New Orleans Creole and "inventor of jazz" (2001 ed.). University of California Press. ISBN 978-0-520-22530-5.
- Pope, John (November 15, 2017). "100 years ago this month, New Orleans closed the book on Storyville". NOLA.com.
- Reich, Howard; Gaines, William M. (2008). Jelly's Blues: The Life, Music, and Redemption of Jelly Roll Morton. Hachette Books. ISBN 978-0-7867-4176-2.
- Rose, Al (1974). Storyville, New Orleans, being an authentic, illustrated account of the notorious red-light district. University of Alabama Press. ISBN 978-0-8173-4403-0.
- Widmer, Mary Lou (2007). New Orleans, 1900 to 1920. Pelican Publishing. ISBN 978-1-58980-401-2.
