= Lulu White =

American brothel madam (c. 1868 – 1931)

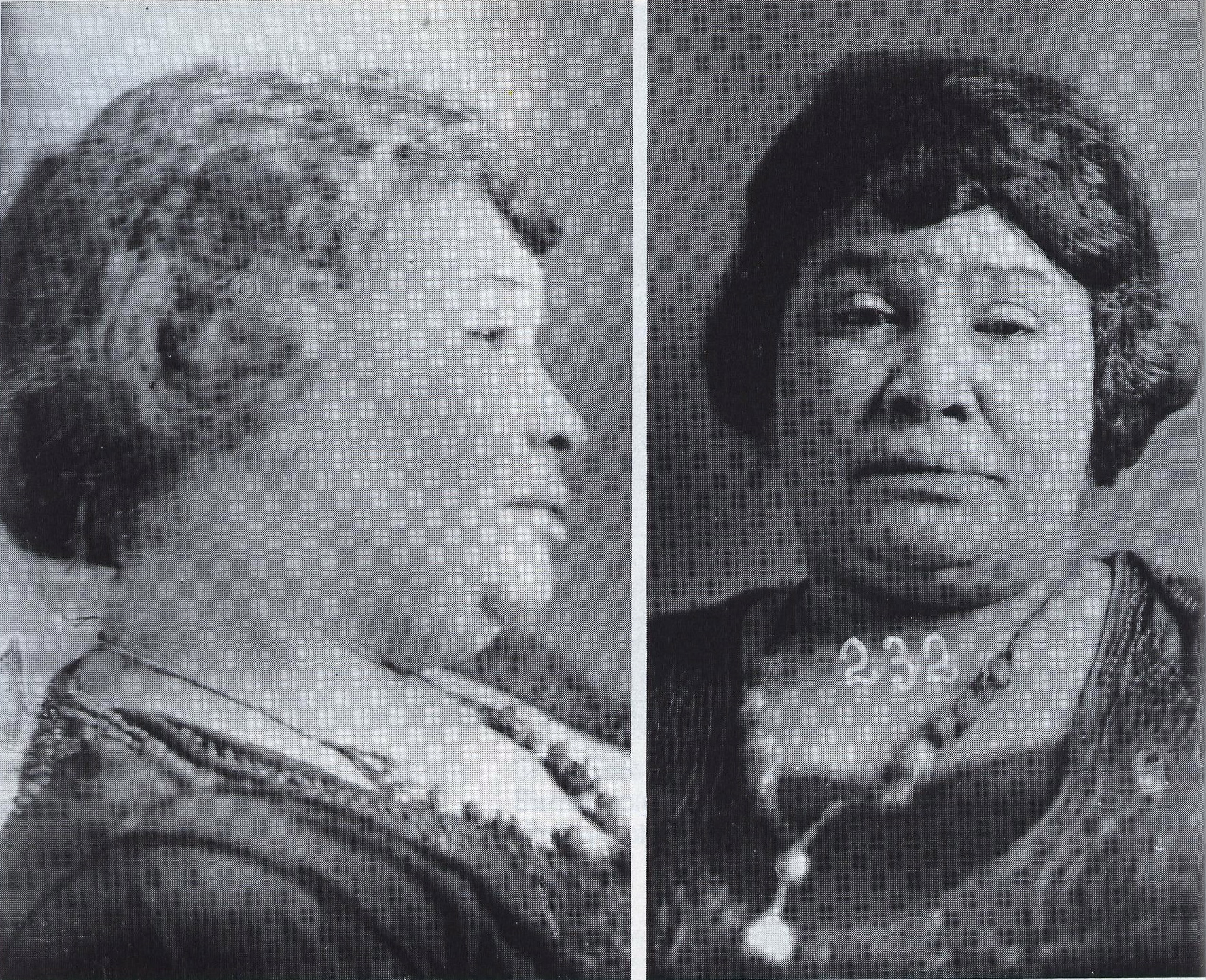
- New Orleans Police Department mug shot of Lulu White, 1920
- Born: Lulu Hendley ca. 1868 near Selma, Alabama, United States
- Died: August 20, 1931 (aged 62–63)
- Other name: Lulu Hendley
- Occupations: Brothel owner, prostitute

Lulu White (Lulu Hendley, ca. 1868 – August 20, 1931) was a brothel madam, procuress and entrepreneur in New Orleans, Louisiana during the Storyville period. An eccentric figure, she was noted for her enormous success as an entrepreneur, love of jewelry, her many failed business ventures, and her criminal record that extended in New Orleans as far back as 1880.

A Blue Book published in Storyville, New Orleans in 1900 described her in this way:

“Nowhere in this country will you find a more popular personage than Madame White who is noted as being the handsomest octoroon in America. Her mansion possesses some of the most costly oil paintings in the southern country, her mirror parlor is also a dream. There is always something new at Lulu White’s that will interest you. Good time is her motto”.

== Early life and career ==
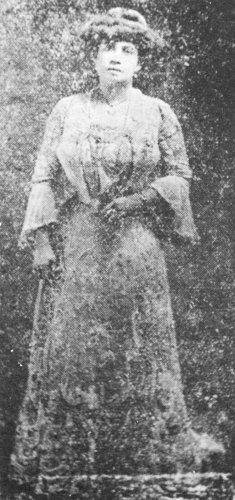
Lulu White circa 1900

White's exact date of birth is unknown. She was born on a farm near Selma, Alabama, but claimed to be an immigrant from the West Indies. Publicity from about 1906 claimed that she was 31 years old; however, she may have actually been somewhat older. She was of mixed race and enjoyed, for a time, an affluence rare for Creoles of color.

In 1906, she ran into financial difficulties leaving her destitute, and moved to California. She commuted between California and Louisiana several times over the course of her career and kept a high profile until the demise of Storyville.

The success of Mahogany Hall made her one of the few black self-made millionaires at the beginning of the century.

Jazz historian Al Rose sought documentation of her death, and believed that she died at the residence of former madam Willie Piazza in 1931. However, a teller at the national bank of New Orleans reported that, in 1941, White made a withdrawal. Otherwise, little information about her post-Storyville life is known.

=== Mahogany Hall ===
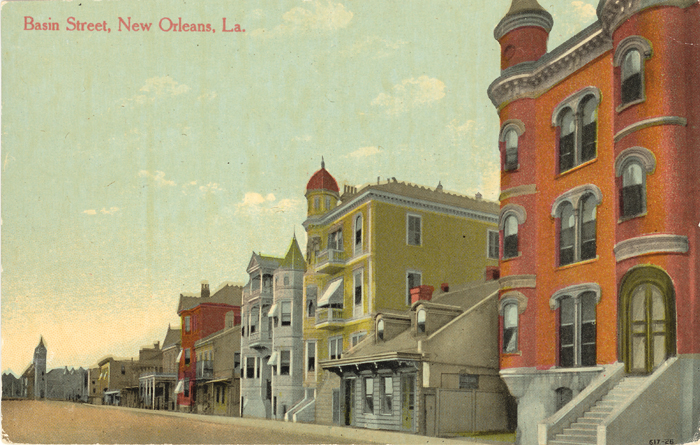
High end brothels along Basin Street in the early 1900s; Mahogany Hall is at far right.

Until forcible closure in 1917, White ran a sumptuous 'Octoroon Parlour' known as Mahogany Hall, located at 235 Basin Street.^{29°57′25.13″N 90°04′20.56″W.}The four-story house reportedly cost $40,000 to build (about $1.5 million in 2026 dollars). In 1929, the structure sold for $11,000.

According to publicity of the time, Mahogany Hall housed 40 women. The official brochure for the house also stated that it had five parlors (one of which was a 'Mirrored Parlor') and fifteen bedrooms, each with its own adjoining bathroom. Famous Storyville photographer E. J. Bellocq's surviving photographs of the house attest to its abundance of elegant furnishings, huge chandeliers and potted ferns. The building housed several expensive oil paintings, Tiffany stained-glass windows and other works of art.

One of the things that set Mahogany Hall apart at the time was its refusal to play by the racial segregation laws of the time, and it was the only interracial brothel in New Orleans. It deliberately hired both white and black prostitutes.

Other pamphlets featured photographs and biographies of each of the 'Octoroon' girls. They also contained a supposed picture of Miss White, but it was actually another picture of Victoria Hall, one of the Octoroons. Aside from Miss Hall, other known residents of Mahogany Hall included Emma Sears (The Colored Carmencita), Clara Miller, Estelle Russell, Sadie Reed and Sadie Levy. Kid Ross, Tony Jackson, and Jelly Roll Morton were among the pianists who performed for the clients in Mahogany Hall.

Mahogany Hall served as a House for the Unemployed in the mid-1940s but was demolished in 1949. The building was one of the last serving brothel structures in the area to be demolished.

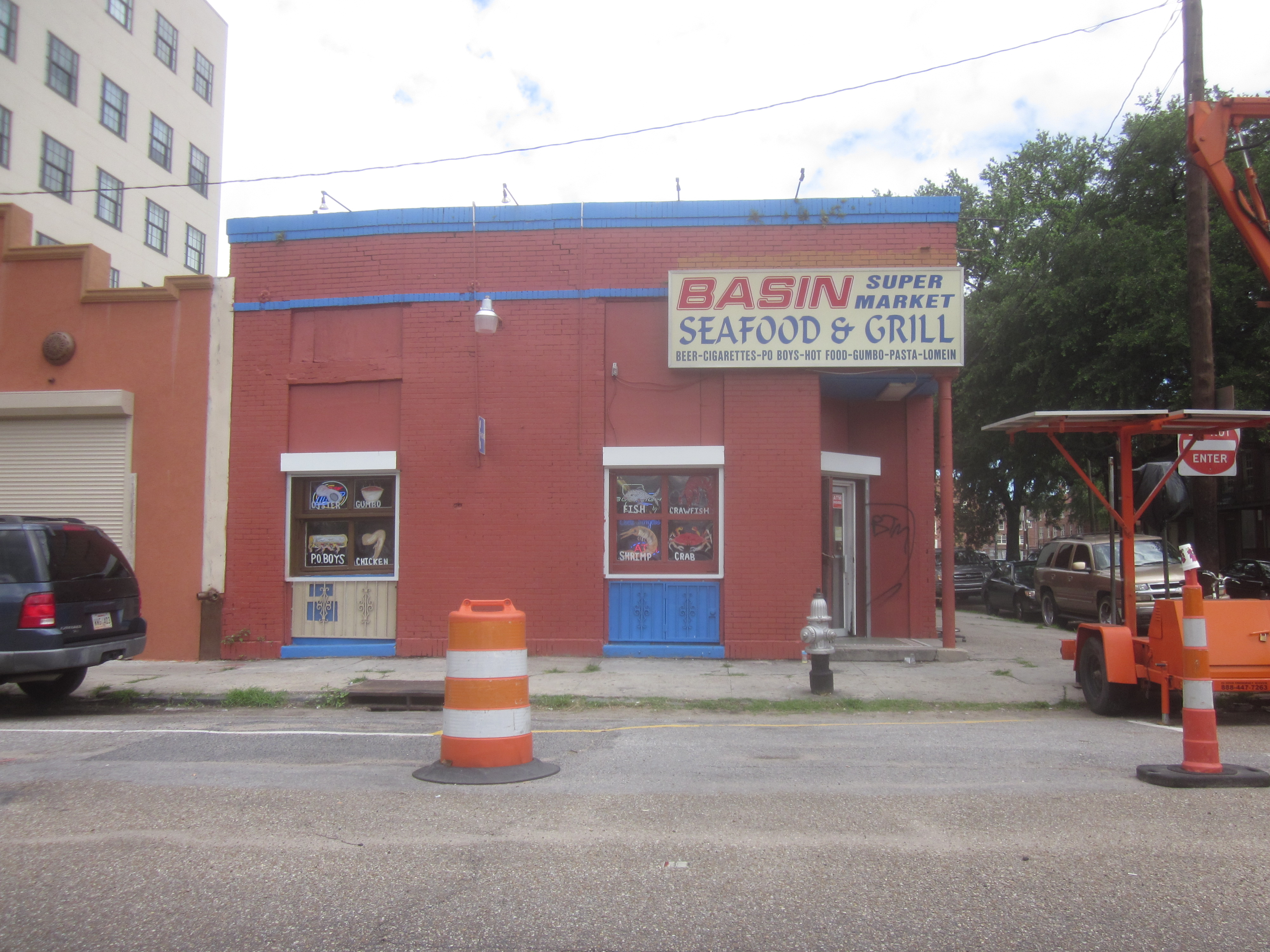
"Basin Super Market" in 2013; housed in what had been the ground floor of Lulu White's Saloon.

In addition to Mahogany Hall, White operated an adjacent drinking establishment at 1200 Bienville Street on the corner of Basin, called "Lulu White's Saloon". The Saloon opened in 1912 and, with the onset of Prohibition, changed to a soft drink bar. Throughout the twenties, White was brought in on charges of violating the Volstead Act. On March 5, 1929, the Mahogany Hall Stomp a song dedicated to Lulu White's Mahogany Hall was written by Spencer Williams and first recorded by Louis Armstrong and the Savoy Ballroom Five and released around April 1929. That same year Lulu sold the Bienville property to New Orleans businessman Leon Heymann. White's Saloon building on Bienville Street was one of the handful of Storyville buildings to survive past the 1940s, but was extensively damaged during Hurricane Betsy in 1965, losing its second story; the ground floor remains in modified condition as a one-story building.

== Historical significance ==
Lulu White and her business neighbors in Storyville were subject to one of New Orleans' first legal test cases in making a vice district ordinance, for mandatory residential segregation based on gender rather than race. The city rules required any woman who engaged in prostitution to live within specified boundaries, and in the separate but equal era of Plessy v. Ferguson, the courts upheld the city's right to maintain those boundaries.

== In popular culture ==
- MADAM: A Novel of New Orleans by Cari Lynn and Kellie Martin (Penguin/Plume, 2014)
- Boston's jazz supper club Lulu White's was named in her honor.
- The film Belle of the Nineties (1934) starring Mae West is said to have been inspired by the exploits of Lulu White (the film's working title was "The Belle of New Orleans").
- In the film Pretty Baby (1978), the brothel madam played by Frances Faye wears a red wig and excessive amounts of jewelry as Lulu White was known to do. The brothel at the center of the film also shares many characteristics with Mahogany Hall, particularly its swirling mahogany staircase.
- The song "Mahogany Hall Stomp" written by Spencer Williams and performed by Louis Armstrong references White's famous establishment.
- Lulu White appears as a fictional character in three of David Fulmer's Storyville mysteries.
- Lulu White is the namesake of a bar in the Saint Georges neighborhood, the 9th Arrondissement, in Paris, France.
- In Ma Rainey's Black Bottom, Cutler refers to Lulu White's establishment.

== See also ==
- List of female adventurers
- Dumas Brothel
