= Kate Townsend =

New Orleans brothel madam

- Born: Katherine Cunningham c. 1839; Liverpool, England
- Died: November 3, 1883 (aged 43–44); New Orleans, Louisiana, US
- Burial place: Metairie Cemetery, New Orleans, Louisiana, US; 29°59′9″N 90°7′4″W
- Occupations: Prostitute, brothel-keeper
- Years active: 1857-1883

Kate Townsend (c. 1839 - November 1, 1883) was a brothel madam during the late nineteenth century in the district of New Orleans that was later to become Storyville. This district became possibly the best known area for prostitution in the nation. Her luxurious brothel on Basin Street was the first of a number of upmarket brothels that the street became famed for.

== Early life ==
Born Katherine Cunningham in about 1839 in Liverpool, England, little is known of her early life. At age 15 she was working as a barmaid in a dance hall in Paradise Street, Liverpool. She became involved with a sailor named Peter Kearnaghan after saving him during a bar fight and became pregnant. After Kearnaghan had returned to sea she gave birth to twins. Leaving the twins and adopting the name Townsend, she left England for America in 1856.

== New Orleans ==
After spending a few weeks in New York, Townsend travelled to New Orleans, arriving in early 1857. Considered an attractive and voluptuous woman, Townsend found employment in Clara Fisher's brothel in Phillipa Street (now Dryades Street). After about 6 months she left Fisher's to work at a house in Canal Street and then in Maggie Thompson's house in Customhouse Street.

In about 1863 Townsend opened her own brothel, renting a house on the corner of Villere Street and Customhouse Street. The house was successful and Townsend made many influential friends through the business including city officials and politicians.

=== 40 Basin Street ===
With the backing of her influential friends, possibly a high-ranking police official, a recorder and several council members, Townsend had a luxurious brownstone and marble brothel built at 40 Basin Street (later 121 South Basin Street and now 30 Elk Pace). The building is reputed to have cost $100,000. The house had white marble fireplaces, French chandeliers, furniture made of highly polished black walnut with damask upholstery, velvet carpets and antiques brought from European merchants.

On July 30, 1870 gambler Gus Taney was murdered in the brothel by Jim White following an argument after Townsend had extended Taney credit. Taney pulled a gun on White, but before he could use it White stabbed him through the heart with a knife. The police attended and left the gun and bowie knife with Townsend as souvenirs. She kept the knife with her at all times from then on for self-defence.

Although slim when younger, Townsend put on weight in her later years and is reported to weigh 300 lb at the time of her death.

== Bill Sykes ==
Townsend had known Troisville Egbert Sykes since soon after her arrival in New Orleans. Initially the relationship had been professional, but later the pair were romantically involved. Sykes, who was commonly known as "Bill", was the black sheep of a respectable New Orleans family. In 1878 Sykes moved into the brothel, keeping the books, doing odd jobs and drumming up business. The arrangement didn't work well and Townsend had him arrested for forging her signature on cheques to the value of $7,000. Townsend subsequently dropped the charges, but after that led Sykes a dogs life. On one occasion she nearly sliced his nose off with a bowie knife that had been given to her by a policeman client and she kept in her reticule for self-defence.

In October 1883 Townsend started to pay a lot of attention to a young gigolo named McLern, who she received in her private rooms. When Sykes protested he was given a beating by Townsend and McLern. The next day Townsend was in the kitchen with her head girl, Molly Johnson, when she grabbed a carving knife and started making stabbing motions, saying she was going to open up Sykes' belly. Johnson managed to calm her down and take the knife from her. Skyes appeared in the kitchen and Townsend attacked him with a breadboard until he fell to the floor and escaped on his hands and knees. An hour later Johnson found Townsend on the stairs to the top floor, where Sykes bedroom was. She told Johnson that she had been to Sykes room to open his belly, but he was not there. Again Johnson managed to calm her down.

Townsend, Johnson, McLern and a friend of McLern got drunk on champagne in a nearby cafe, Pizzinis, on the night of November 1. McLern and Townsend got into an argument in which McLern threatened to smash a bottle over Townsend's head. She pulled out her bowie knife and McLern told her the bottle threat was only a joke. Townsend kept the knife in her hand and told the others she needed to cut somebody with it, and then said she was going to go home and open Sykes belly and left the cafe, Johnson also left the cafe and when Thompson went to her boudoir, Johnson warned Sykes to keep his door locked and barred. The next day and night Townsend remained in bed with a hangover.

== Death ==
On the morning of November 3, the brothel's housekeeper, Mary Philomena, heard shouts and screams coming from Townsend's room. Opening the door she saw Townsend and Sykes fighting near the bed. Sykes pushed her out of the door and locked it. There were more screams and then silence. Sykes came out of the room with his clothes torn and blood on him. He said to the housekeeper "Well Mary, Kate's gone" and, when Philomena asked him what he'd done, replied "I had to do it". Sykes then limped upstairs. Philomena, who had now been joined by the cook, Rose Garcia, opened the door and found Townsend lying in a pool of blood. They tried unsuccessfully to revive her.

Officers Clarke and Hormie, having heard the commotion rushed to the room. Clarke went off to find a doctor and hailed down Dr. Venize, who happened to be passing. Venize examined the body, but Townsend had been dead too long for him to do anything for her. One of the officers noticed a blood-stained Bowie knife in the yard through an open window. Also in the yard were a bloody pair of pruning shears. Suspecting Sykes may be the assailant, officer Clarke went to Sykes' room. Sykes had changed his clothes and told the officer he wanted to give himself up and was arrested and taken to the Central Police Station.

Skyes told the police that as soon as he entered the room Townsend had attacked with a knife she had hidden under her pillow. He had managed to get the knife off her but she then attacked her with a pair of pruning shears. He claimed he had killed her in self-defence.

Townsend's body was laid out in the drawing room in a $600 white silk dress. For the funeral on November 5, the furnishings were covered in white silk and the guests served with champagne, which had been Townsend's wish. 25 coaches full of women followed the hearse to Metairie Cemetery, where she was buried in a $400 metallic casket.

=== Trial ===
Sykes appeared before a judge on November 11 and charged with Townsend's murder. He was remanded to Orleans Parish Prison. The murder trial started on January 29, 1884. After hearing the testimony of over 20 witnesses, the jury returned a verdict of not guilty of Townsend's murder on the grounds of self-defense. There was public outcry at the verdict, with suggestions that political connections or bribery had enabled Sykes to walk free.

=== Estate ===
Sykes produced a will dated September 3, 1873, in which Townsend made him the sole beneficiary. At probate Sykes was appointed executor. In February 1884 the court removed him as executor for pocketing some of the money that should have gone to the estate. The attorney general requested that Sykes only received a tenth share of the movables as "Sykes and Thompson had lived together in open concubinage", which the court accepted. Although Sykes appealed this, the ruling was upheld.

The public administrator leased the brothel to Molly Johnson, who continued to operate it until her death in 1889. The contents were then sold off and the establishment closed. It was subsequently sold to the Benevolent and Protective Order of Elks for use as a lodge.

In 1885 Ellen Talley, née Cunningham, claimed to be the sister of Townsend and entered a claim on the estate. This claim was rejected by Judge Houston, who noted that the resemblance between Talley and Townsend was limited to nationality, not familial alikeness.

Probate was finally settled in 1888, with the bulk of the estate going to the State of Louisiana. Sykes appealed to the Louisiana Supreme Court, but the court upheld the ruling of the lower court. The estate amounted to $81,936, but after $30,000 lawyers fees and court fees only £33,142.65 went to the state treasury. Sykes only received $34.

== Bibliography ==
- deClouet, Fred (1999). Scandalous New Orleans: An Encyclopedia of Crime, Prostitution, Corruption, Loose Ladies, Gamblers, and Crooked Politicians. AuthorHouse. ISBN 978-1-58500-772-1.
- Goodman, Jonathan (2005). Tracks to Murder. Kent State University Press. p. 156. ISBN 978-0-87338-825-2. "Troisville Egbert Sykes."
- Gauthreaux, Alan G.; Hippensteel, D. G. (2015). Dark Bayou: Infamous Louisiana Homicides. McFarland. ISBN 978-1-4766-6295-4.
- Rose, Al (1974). Storyville, New Orleans, being an authentic, illustrated account of the notorious red-light district. University of Alabama Press. ISBN 978-0-8173-4403-0.
- Taylor, Troy (2010). Wicked New Orleans: The Dark Side of the Big Easy. Arcadia Publishing. ISBN 978-1-61423-011-3.
