= Thomas C. Anderson =

American political boss and state legislator

Anderson, c. 1915

Thomas Anderson (1858–1931) was a political boss and state legislator, and the unofficial "mayor" of Storyville in New Orleans, Louisiana.

== Early life ==
Thomas Charles Anderson was born to a poor family in the Irish Channel neighborhood of New Orleans. There are conflicting details about the date of his birth, and of his full name. It is thought he was born on November 22, 1858, and that his real name was Thomas Charles Anderson, but it is not known for sure. It is also thought that his father was Scottish and that his mother was from Ireland, but the details remain sketchy and not much is known about his early life. As a young boy he hawked the Daily Picayune newspaper, helping police catch petty thieves, and acting as a "stool pigeon" for the police. He also delivered cocaine and opium to various brothels around the city, marking his first association with both the police and with the demi-monde, which would serve him greatly later on in life.

Although he did not have much formal education, he had a keen eye and was known to be good with numbers which helped him gain employment as a bookkeeper with the Insurance Oil Company, and later with the Louisiana Lottery Company. In 1880, he married one Emma Schwartz, a Dutch Immigrant from the Irish Channel. They bought a house on St. Louis Street, and soon had a child by the name of Irene, but the tranquility of married life did not last long for Emma died of Typhoid the following year, and he had Irene placed in the St. Vincent's Infant Asylum. Through his work in the Louisiana Lottery Company, he began to cultivate political connections around this time. He donated to various political parties, and attended various charity events put on by the influential Men's Clubs in New Orleans. These new found political connections, and his already strong relationship with the Police Department allowed him to open up his first restaurant and bar, the Astoria Club, on North Rampart Street in 1882. The Astoria Club became a place where the local bigwigs he had come to know and the more underworld types of New Orleans could associate and discuss "pay-offs," and other payments for the protection they provided.

== Storyville era ==
In 1897, he opened up another restaurant and bar with a man named Billy Struve, a young police reporter from the New Orleans Daily who became a life-time associate, the establishment was called the Fair Play Saloon, and it was located at the corner of Basin and Customhouse Streets. It was his first foray in the area that would become known as Storyville, a year before it would become the country's first legal red light district. It is curious that he opened the Fair Play a year before the law was enacted. It seems possible he had some inside knowledge from his connections to the political establishment of New Orleans. Nonetheless, with the passing of legislation creating Storyville, Tom Anderson was in perfect position to reap the benefits and the rewards, and was on his way to running and profiting from what would become known as "Anderson County," and on his way to becoming the political boss of the Fourth Ward in New Orleans, Louisiana.

A year later he changed the name of his restaurant and saloon from the Free Play Saloon to the Arlington Annex. He seems to have taken an interest and became business partners with one Josie Arlington, the notorious madam who had run a brothel at 172 Customhouse Street just around the corner from his Fair Play Saloon. It is said he married a woman by the name of Catherine Turnbull in 1894, and that it ended in divorce, but it is not known for sure. Through the years, Tom Anderson become associated with many woman of the demi-monde, there was also one Hilma Burt who it is said he helped finance her purchase of Flo Meeker's Place, as stated by Jelly Roll Morton:

"Hilma Burt's was on the corner of Customhouse and Basin streets, next door to Tom Anderson's saloon – Tom Anderson was the King of the District and ran the Louisiana Legislature and Hilma Burt was supposed to be his "old lady." Hers was no doubt one of the best paying places in the city and I thought I had a very bad night when I made under a hundred dollars."

It is not known if his association with Josie Arlington, the notorious Madam, was in much the same way as his association with Hilda Burt, but one can only assume that the relationship between them was along the same lines. In 1910, he met Gertrude Dix, an attractive and cultured 29-year-old woman, and she became the de facto manager for many of his properties and businesses, and his partner for most of the remainder of his life.

He branched out into various other businesses, trying his hand at boxing, becoming a manager of Andy Bowen, the light weight champion of the South, giving away free tickets to all his friends and associates, and he got involved with the Record Oil Refining Company, later called the Liberty Oil Company, even sponsoring a race horse through the company at the Fair Grounds Race Course in New Orleans, with the best seats in the house reserved for all his political friends. He also expanded the number of establishments that he owned, opening up the Stag at 714 Gravier Street, and the Arlington at 114 North Rampart Street. Then in 1904, Tom Anderson went even further, seeking to legitimize himself by getting elected to the State Legislator in Baton Rouge, and although the opposition was fierce especially from the more conservative factions in the city, he won election on the Republican ticket, serving for 16 years as a member of the influential House and Ways committee, and also on the Committee on the Affairs of the city of New Orleans, but through all his success the winds of change were blowing.

== Death and legacy ==
Because in 1917 the axe fell on the first legal red light district in the United States. In August of that year, Secretary of the Navy Josephus Daniels ordered that Storyville be closed down for good. Tom Anderson, now in his sixties, was still the owner and operator of his restaurant and bar on North Rampart Street, but the flush times had come to an end. But even that got him in trouble with the law around the year 1920. He was charged with operating a "lewd establishment" within ten miles of a military base, and having forty "known prostitutes" working on any given night. He denied all charges, saying that he had been in the restaurant business since 1892, and had a lawful license to run his establishment. Ending in mistrial, the story was in all the newspapers, but those would be the last headlines for Tom Anderson, and the last of his known associations with prostitution and the saloon business.

In 1928, he suffered a serious illness, and began to feel remorse and repentance on the life he had led before, attending church regularly and giving money to charity, and even marrying his longtime partner Gertrude Dix, before dying in 1931. But even in his death the problems of his old life never went away. In his will he had given all his money and assets to his newly married wife, a sum of 120,000 dollars, but his daughter from his first wife, one Irene Delsa, who married George Delsa a former manager of his Rampart Street establishment, questioned the will on the grounds of the state concubinage law, saying that Tom and Gertrude had never been legally married. Gertrude eventually settled with his daughter, giving her half of the estate, and living out her days in an elegant house in the French Quarter of New Orleans until she died in 1961.

At the time of his death, the newspapers reported that he was a respected and distinguished citizen without a passable mention of his past life, as the unofficial mayor and political boss of Storyville. A man famed for his hospitality and for his ability to cultivate and bring together the denizens of the Fourth Ward, much for his own gain and much for his own pleasure, as Jelly Roll Morton said it best:

"I'm telling you this tenderloin district was something that nobody has ever seen before, or since. . . They had everything in the District from the highest class to the lowest. . ."

and Tom Anderson, the unofficial mayor of Storyville, had a hand in it all, as he sat in his Saloon at the corner of Customhouse and Basin, entertaining his friends and helping out strangers, running his businesses, and controlling all the vice that came through the district they once called "Anderson County."
