= Saint Louis Cemetery =

Three cemeteries in Louisiana, U.S.

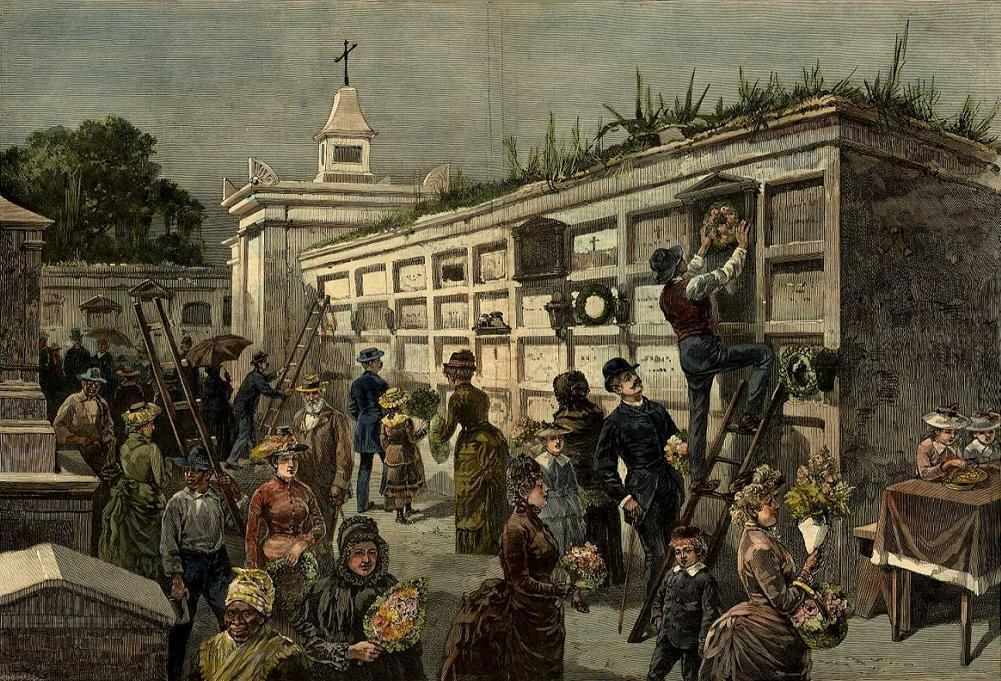
All Saints Day in New Orleans – Decorating the Tombs in One of the City Cemeteries, an 1885 engraving

Saint Louis Cemetery (French: Cimetière Saint-Louis, Spanish: Cementerio de San Luis) is the name of three Catholic cemeteries in New Orleans, Louisiana. Most of the graves are above-ground vaults constructed in the 18th and 19th centuries.

Cemeteries No. 1 and No. 2 are included on the National Register of Historic Places and the Louisiana African American Heritage Trail.

== Saint Louis No. 1 ==
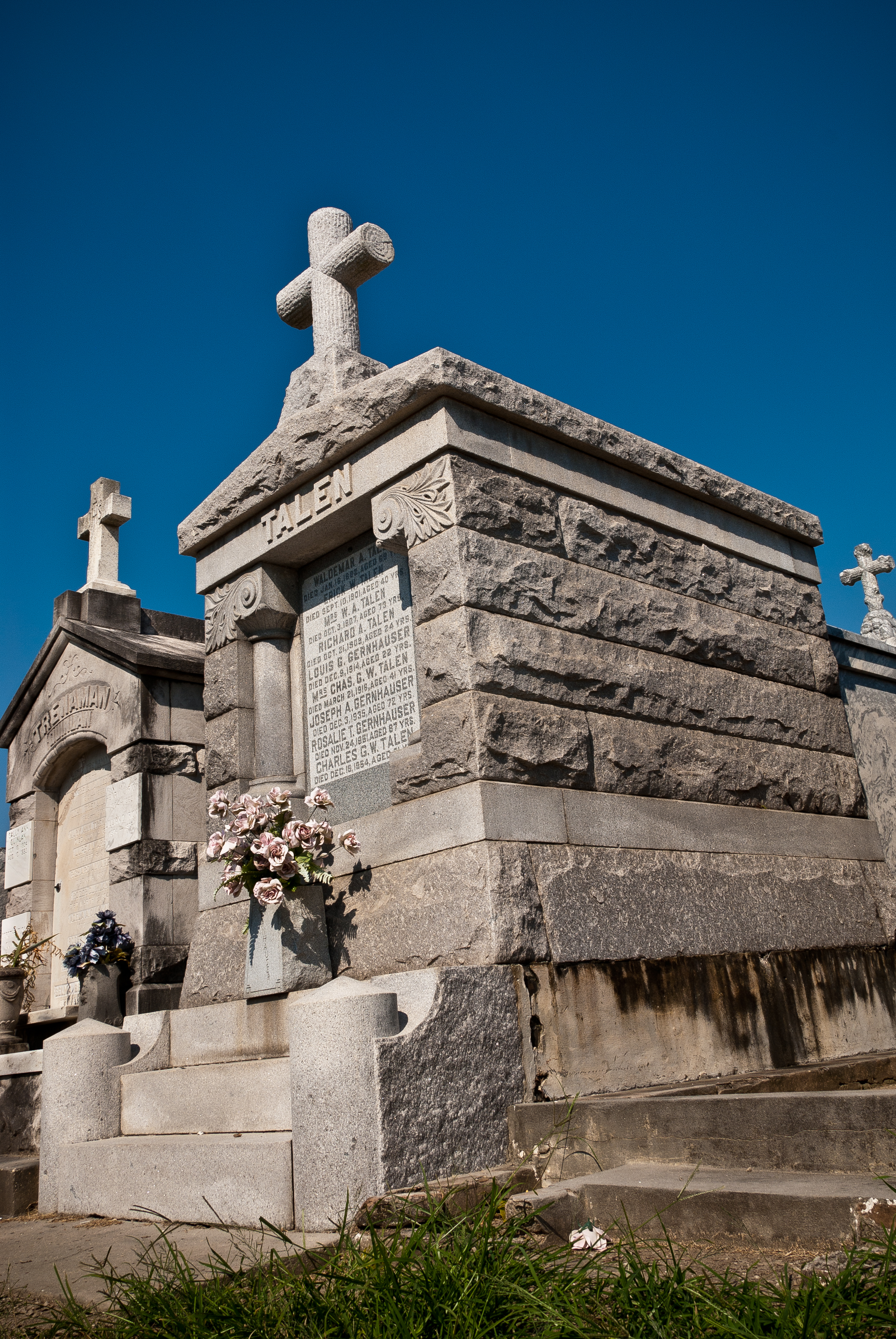
Vaults in Saint Louis No. 1

- St. Louis Cemetery No. 1
- U.S. National Register of Historic Places
- U.S. Historic district
- Location within Louisiana Location within the United States
- Location: Bounded by Basin, St. Louis, Conti, and Treme Sts., New Orleans, Louisiana, U.S.
- Coordinates: 29°57′34″N 90°4′17″W
- Built: 1789
- Architect: Foy, Florville; Monsseaux, P.H.
- Architectural style: Neo-Classical
- NRHP reference No.: 75000855
- Added to NRHP: July 30, 1975

St. Louis Cemetery No. 1 is the oldest and among the most prominent cemeteries in New Orleans. It was opened in 1789, replacing the city's older St. Peter Cemetery (French: Cimetière St. Peter; no longer in existence) as the main burial ground when the city was redesigned after a fire in 1788.

It is 8 blocks from the Mississippi River, on the north side of Basin Street, one block beyond the inland border of the French Quarter. It borders the former Iberville Projects. It has been in continuous use since its foundation. The nonprofit group Save Our Cemeteries and commercial businesses offer tours for a fee.

Notable New Orleanians buried in St. Louis No. 1 include Etienne de Boré, a wealthy pioneer of the sugar industry and the first mayor of New Orleans; Homer Plessy, the plaintiff from the landmark 1896 Plessy v. Ferguson Supreme Court decision on civil rights. Ernest N. "Dutch" Morial, the first African-American mayor of New Orleans was interred there in 1989. Subsequently, Morial's family built a new family tomb at St. Louis Cemetery No. 3, and Morial's body was reinterred there in late 2014. Notable creole author and educator Alexander Dimitry is buried at Saint Louis Cemetery Number One. Most of the Dimitry family is interred there including; Andrea Dimitry and his wife Marianne Celeste Dragon. Marianne Céleste Dragon was the subject of a famous portrait painted by José Salazar.

The cemetery inspired an Alkemia Perfumes' scent of the same name, which is described as "An atmospheric brooding of Spanish moss, crumbling stone, old cement, red clay brick, and graveyard dirt."

The renowned Voodoo priestess Marie Laveau is believed to be interred in the Glapion family crypt. Other notable New Orleanians here include Bernard de Marigny, the French-Creole aristocrat and politician who founded both the Faubourg Marigny and Mandeville, Louisiana; Barthelemy Lafon, the architect and surveyor who allegedly became one of Jean Lafitte's pirates; and Paul Morphy, one of the earliest world champions of chess. Delphine LaLaurie, the notoriously cruel slave owner, is also believed to lie in rest here. Architect and engineer Benjamin Latrobe was buried at St. Louis No. 1 after dying from yellow fever in 1820, while doing engineering for the New Orleans water works. In 2010, actor Nicolas Cage purchased a pyramid-shaped tomb to be his future final resting place.

The cemetery spans just one square block but is the resting place of many thousands. A Protestant section (generally not vaulted) lies in the northwest section.

Effective March 1, 2015, the Roman Catholic Archdiocese of New Orleans, which owns and manages this cemetery, has closed it to the general public, ostensibly because of the rise in vandalism there. However, in a controversial move, the diocese is now charging tour companies for access ($4,500 per year, or lesser amounts for short periods). Families who own tombs can apply for a pass to visit.

== Saint Louis No. 2 ==
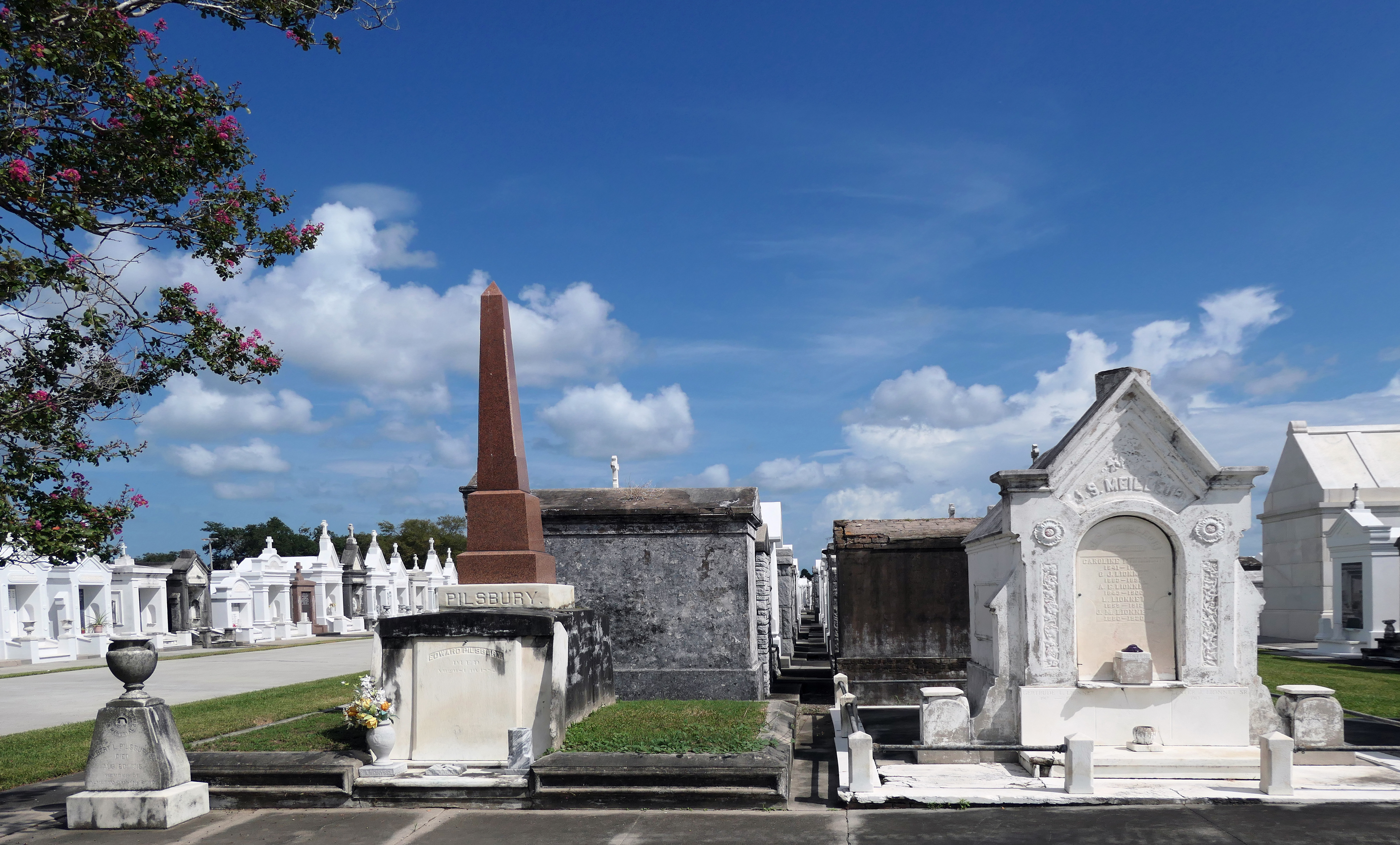
A view between the vaults at cemetery 3

- St. Louis Cemetery No. 2
- U.S. National Register of Historic Places
- Location within Louisiana Location within the United States
- Location: Bounded by Claiborne, Robertson, St. Louis, and Iberville St., New Orleans, Louisiana
- Coordinates: 29°57′38″N 90°4′32″W
- Built: 1823
- Architect: Multiple
- Architectural style: Greek Revival, Exotic Revival, Gothic Revival
- NRHP reference No.: 75000856
- Added to NRHP: July 30, 1975

St. Louis No. 2 is located some three blocks back from St. Louis No. 1, bordering Claiborne Avenue. It was consecrated in 1823. A number of notable jazz and rhythm and blues musicians are buried here, including Danny Barker and Ernie K-Doe. Also entombed here is Andre Cailloux (1825–1863), African-American Union hero and martyr of the American Civil War.

The cemetery received minor flooding during the aftermath of Hurricane Katrina, and its tombs seemed virtually untouched by the storm when the water went down, aside from the brownish waterline visible on all structures that were flooded.

There are many notable citizens of 19th and 20th century New Orleans laid to rest here. These include the Venerable Mother Henriette DeLille, who is a candidate for sainthood by the Catholic Church, Rodolphe Desdunes (1849–1928) and Jean Baptiste Dupeire (1795–1874) prominent citizen of New Orleans, among others.

It was listed on the National Register of Historic Places in 1975.

Other politicians and soldiers interred/entombed here:

- Jacques Villeré (1761–1830) of St. Bernard Parish, La. Second Governor of Louisiana after statehood, commander of the 1st Division, La. State Militia, at the Battle of New Orleans.
- Oscar Dunn (1826–1871) Emancipated from slavery as a child, he became the first elected black lieutenant governor of a U.S. state.
- Pierre Soulé (1801–1870) of New Orleans, Orleans Parish, La. Born in France. Member of Louisiana state senate, 1845; U.S. Senator from Louisiana, 1847, 1849–1853; U.S. Minister to Spain, 1853–1855; officer in the Confederate Army during the Civil War. Died in New Orleans.
- Charles Genois (c. 1793 – 1866) of New Orleans, Orleans Parish, La. Whig Mayor of New Orleans, La., 1838–1840.
- Robert Brown Elliott (1842–1884), also known as R. B. Elliott, of South Carolina. Born in Massachusetts, 1842. Republican. Delegate to Republican National Convention from South Carolina, 1868 (alternate), 1880; member of South Carolina state legislature; U.S. Representative from South Carolina 3rd District, 1871–1875. Black.
- Paul Capdevielle (1844–1922) of New Orleans, Orleans Parish, La. Born in New Orleans, Orleans Parish, La. Mayor of New Orleans, La., 1900–1904. Died in Bay St. Louis, Hancock County, Mississippi.
- Carleton Hunt (1836–1921) of Louisiana. Born in New Orleans, Orleans Parish, La. Nephew of Theodore Gaillard Hunt. Democrat. Served in the Confederate Army during the Civil War; U.S. Representative from Louisiana 1st District, 1883–85.
- Ignacy Szymański (1806–1874) was a Polish and American soldier. Born in New Orleans. He served in the Confederate States Army during the American Civil War. He was appointed to colonel of Chalmette Regiment, mainly made of Scandinavian immigrants from the Louisiana State Militia.
- Dominique You (or Youx) (c. 1775 – 1830) was a former privateer and Battle of New Orleans veteran.
- Pierre Nord Alexis (1820–1910) was the President of Haiti from December 1902 until December 1908. He seized power with the help of the United States, and declared himself "President for Life" at age 87 in January 1908, and was exiled in December of that year.

== Saint Louis No. 3 ==
St. Louis No. 3 is located approximately 2 miles (3.2 km) away from the French Quarter, some 30 blocks from the Mississippi River, fronting Esplanade Avenue near Bayou St. John. (Coordinates: 29°59′06″N 90°05′12″W.) It opened in 1854. The crypts on average are more elaborate than at the other St. Louis cemeteries, including a number of fine 19th century marble tombs. Those entombed include ragtime composer Paul Sarebresole, photographer E. J. Bellocq, and painter Ralston Crawford. Another to be entombed here is Sweet Emma Barrett [1897–1983], a self-taught jazz piano player and singer. New Orleans mayor Ernest N. "Dutch" Morial was reinterred at St. Louis Cemetery No. 3 in a new tomb for the Morial family.

St. Louis No. 3 also includes a Greek Orthodox section. The cemetery was heavily flooded during the aftermath of Hurricane Katrina in 2005, but its tombs escaped relatively unscathed. There was some plaster damage from debris.

== See also ==
- Historic Cemeteries of New Orleans
- Metairie Cemetery
- List of United States cemeteries
