= Anne Cook =

Anne or Ann Cook may refer to:

- Ann Cook (cookery book writer) (fl. c. 1725 – c. 1760), English cookery book writer
- Ann Cook (musician) (1886–1962), American blues and gospel singer
- Ann Cook (soccer) (born 1974), American soccer coach and former professional soccer player
- Ann Turner Cook (1926–2022), American educator, mystery writer, Gerber baby logo model
- Ann Cooke (1527 or 1528–1610), English gentlewoman and scholar
- Ann Jordan (born 1934), née Cook, director of corporations and non-profit foundations
- Anne Owers (born 1947), married name Cook, Chief Inspector of Prisons
- Ann Cook, birth name of Tchaiko Kwayana (1937–2017), educator, pan-Africanist, and wife of Guyanese politician Eusi Kwayana
