= Albert Weiblen =

German-born American architect

Albert Weiblen (1857–1957) was a German-born American architect and sculptor. His company, the Albert Weiblen Marble and Granite Company, was based in New Orleans and specialized in monuments and burial structures.

== Life and career ==
Weiblen was born in Metzingen, Württemberg in 1857. He immigrated to the United States in 1883, arrived in New Orleans two years later and worked as a sculptor for Kursheedt and Bienvenu. By 1888, he established his own marble yard and showroom, eventually incorporating his operations as the Albert Weiblen Marble & Granite Company.

The Weiblen company operated a large quarry in Stone Mountain, Georgia. Day-to-day work at the quarry was initially overseen by Weiblen himself, though he later hired Italian sculptor Theodore Bottinelli. The firm served New Orleans patrons primarily, as well as many other parts of the South. Weiblen operated a showroom in New Orleans at 116 City Park Avenue. Most of Weiblen's monuments were of Amphiprostyle design.

After Weiblen's death at the age of 99, his daughter in law Norma Merritt Weiblen took up company operations. In 1969, Weiblen Marble & Granite was sold to Stewart Enterprises. The Weiblen company papers are now divided across the Southeastern Architectural Archive at Tulane University and the Earl K. Long Library at the University of New Orleans.

== Notable works ==
- William G. Helis, Sr. mausoleum (n.d.), Metairie Cemetery, New Orleans, Louisiana
- Tomb of Lodge No.30 of the Benevolent and Protective Order of Elks (1912), Greenwood Cemetery, New Orleans, Louisiana
- P.G.T. Beauregard Monument (1913), New Orleans, Louisiana; removed on May 17, 2017
- Tomb of Josie Arlington, Metairie Cemetery (1914), New Orleans, Louisiana
- Thomas Egleston Monument (1918), Atlanta, Georgia
- Downman Tomb (1920), Metairie Cemetery, New Orleans, Louisiana
- Tombs of Joseph and Lucca Vaccaro (1920s), Metairie Cemetery, New Orleans, Louisiana
- Bloom Fountain (1927), Monroe Street, Vicksburg, Mississippi; part of the Uptown Vicksburg Historic District

== Sources ==
- Albert Weiblen biography
- Weiblen Company's Drawings
