= Willie Piazza =

American brothel madam

Willie Vincent Piazza (c. 1865 – November 2, 1932) was a sex worker and brothel proprietor in the Storyville area of New Orleans, United States, during that red light district's period of legal operation. From 1898 until the district's closure in 1917, Piazza worked as a madam and specialized in providing octoroon women for her clients; she herself was mixed-race.

== Early life ==
Little is known about Piazza's early life. Her parents, Italian immigrant Vincent Piazza and woman of colour, Celia Caldwell, were both still teenagers and unmarried at the time of her birth. Their daughter had at least two other siblings. Piazza was born in Copiah County, Mississippi and first moved to New Orleans in the mid-1890s.

== "Countess" Willie Piazza ==
Operating for a period of about twenty years, Piazza became known in Storyville for her brothel parlor. She was one of several women of mixed ancestry to operate brothels in the area, Lulu White being perhaps the most prominent. Purchasing her 317 N. Basin Street premises for $12,000 in 1907, she spent an additional $30,000 on furnishings and other upgrades; the brothel was immediately successful, allowing Piazza to pay off the mortgage within two years. Piazza's "girls" were known around New Orleans for their fine clothes, private coaches, and for their abilities to sing and play musical instruments; jazz pianist Jelly Roll Morton sometimes played her upright white piano. The average annual income for a Willie Piazza octoroon was thought to be $1,000-$2,000. Piazza herself became known as "Countess Willie Piazza" and cultivated an image of European sophistication. She used a “two foot ivory, gold and diamond” cigarette holder to smoke Russian cigarettes.

After the closure of Storyville in 1917, Piazza continued to work as a prostitute and procuress.

Piazza was one of the main characters (played by Virginia Mayo) in the 1978 Dennis Kane film French Quarter.

== Death ==
Willie Piazza died from cancer on November 2, 1932, in New Orleans. Due to careful investments, she reportedly left a significant estate.
