= Ann Cook (musician) =

American blues and gospel singer (1886–1962)

Background information
- Also known as: Bad Ann
- Born: Ann Cook; Fazendeville, Louisiana
- Died: September 29, 1962 New Orleans, Louisiana
- Genres: Classic female blues, gospel
- Occupation: Singer
- Instrument: Vocals

Ann Cook (April 1886 – September 29, 1962) was an American blues and gospel singer. Born and raised in rural Louisiana in an area named Fazendeville in St. Bernard Parish, Cook moved to New Orleans as a teenager. She worked as a prostitute and singer in the Storyville neighborhood, living in an area known as "The Battlefield".

She worked out of Willie Piazza's brothel during the later years of Storyville's existence, and after the end of World War I and Storyville's dismantling, Cook moved to Rampart Street. During this time, she worked on two of her surviving recordings, "Mama Cookie Blues" and "He’s the Sweetest Black Man in Town", which were originally published by Victor Records in 1927. At the time, her voice was considered so well-liked that it could "stop the traffic on Rampart Street".

In the late 1940s and 1950s, Cook left the blues and began to take up gospel music, working with Wooden Joe Nicholas and his band on the single The Lord Will Make a Way, released in 1949. Blues historian Bill Russell attempted to have Cook record more blues music during this time due to a revival of New Orleans blues. She refused to return to blues music and continued with gospel music until her death in 1962.
