= Minnie White =

American brothel owner

Minnie White was an American brothel owner in Storyville, New Orleans in the early part of the twentieth century. She operated out of a large mansion at 221 North Basin Street, in New Orleans, Louisiana, between 1907 and 1917. The brothel closed when, under pressure from The War and Navy Department, Mayor Martin Behrman closed Storyville. For most or all of that time, she co-owned the structure with another madam, Jessie Brown. A 1911-12 edition of the Storyville Blue Book indicates that the phone number of White's establishment was 1663 Main.

Minnie White had a doctor visit once a month to check the prostitutes' health. The brothel was grandly furnished, and had a resident pianist. Many of White's charges were advertised as talented singers of bawdy ballads in addition to their regular duties as prostitutes. A photograph by E. J. Bellocq (circa 1912) of one of her girls, one Marguerite Griffin, is frequently reproduced in texts about Storyville. Bellocq captioned the photograph "a prime attraction at Minnie White's place at 221 North Basin Street was Marguerite Griffin who could not only handle the conventional duties of a Storyville tart but also knew the lyrics of countless bawdy ballads"
