= William G. Helis Sr. =

American businessman

William George Helis Sr.
- Born: October 17, 1886; Tropaia, Greece
- Died: July 25, 1950 (aged 63); Baltimore, Maryland, United States
- Resting place: Metairie Cemetery
- Occupation(s): Oilman, Racehorse owner/breeder, Racetrack owner
- Known for: Helis Stock Farm
- Spouse: Bessie Felch
- Children: 4
- Awards: Fair Grounds Racing Hall of Fame (1991)

William George Helis Sr. (October 17, 1886 – July 25, 1950) was an impoverished Greek emigrant to the United States who made a fortune in the oil business and who became a major owner/breeder of Thoroughbred racehorses and racetrack owner. In his obituary, the Pittsburg Press called William Helis "one of the amazing figures of the American oilfields."

A resident and legal domicile of New Orleans, Louisiana, William Helis died at Johns Hopkins Hospital in Baltimore, Maryland. His remains were brought home to New Orleans where he was interred in the Metairie Cemetery. His mausoleum was built by American architect and sculptor, Albert Weiblen.

In 1991, William Helis was posthumously inducted into the Fair Grounds Racing Hall of Fame.

William George Jr. became managing partner of his father's various oil properties and was also heavily involved in Thoroughbred horse racing.
