= Storyville, New Orleans =

Former red-light district in Louisiana, US

Coordinates: 29°57′32.69″N 90°04′25.73″W

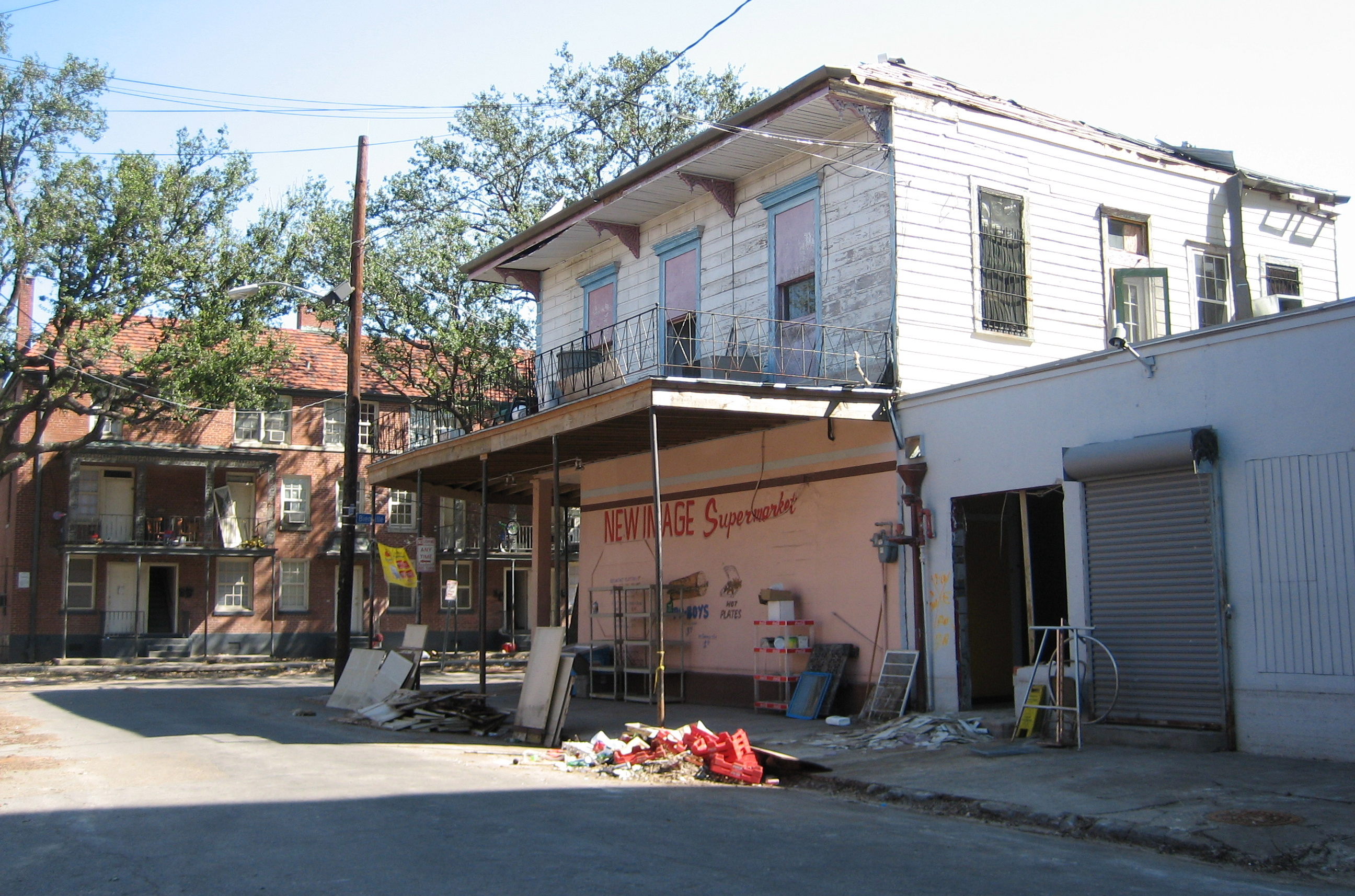
One of the few surviving buildings from Storyville, 2005 photograph. 100 years earlier, the "New Image Supermarket" building housed Frank Early's saloon, where Tony Jackson regularly played.

Storyville was the red-light district of New Orleans, Louisiana, from 1897 to 1917. It was established by municipal ordinance under the New Orleans City Council, to regulate prostitution. Sidney Story, a city alderman, wrote guidelines and legislation to control prostitution within the city. The ordinance designated an area of the city in which prostitution, although still nominally illegal, was tolerated or regulated. The area was originally referred to as "The District", but its nickname, "Storyville", soon caught on, much to the chagrin of Alderman Story. It was bounded by North Robertson, Iberville, Basin, and St. Louis Streets. It was located by a train station, making it a popular destination for travelers throughout the city, and became a centralized attraction in the heart of New Orleans. Only a few of its remnants remain visible. The neighborhood lies in Faubourg Tremé and the majority of the land was repurposed for public housing. It is well known for being the home of jazz musicians, especially Louis Armstrong as a minor.

== History ==
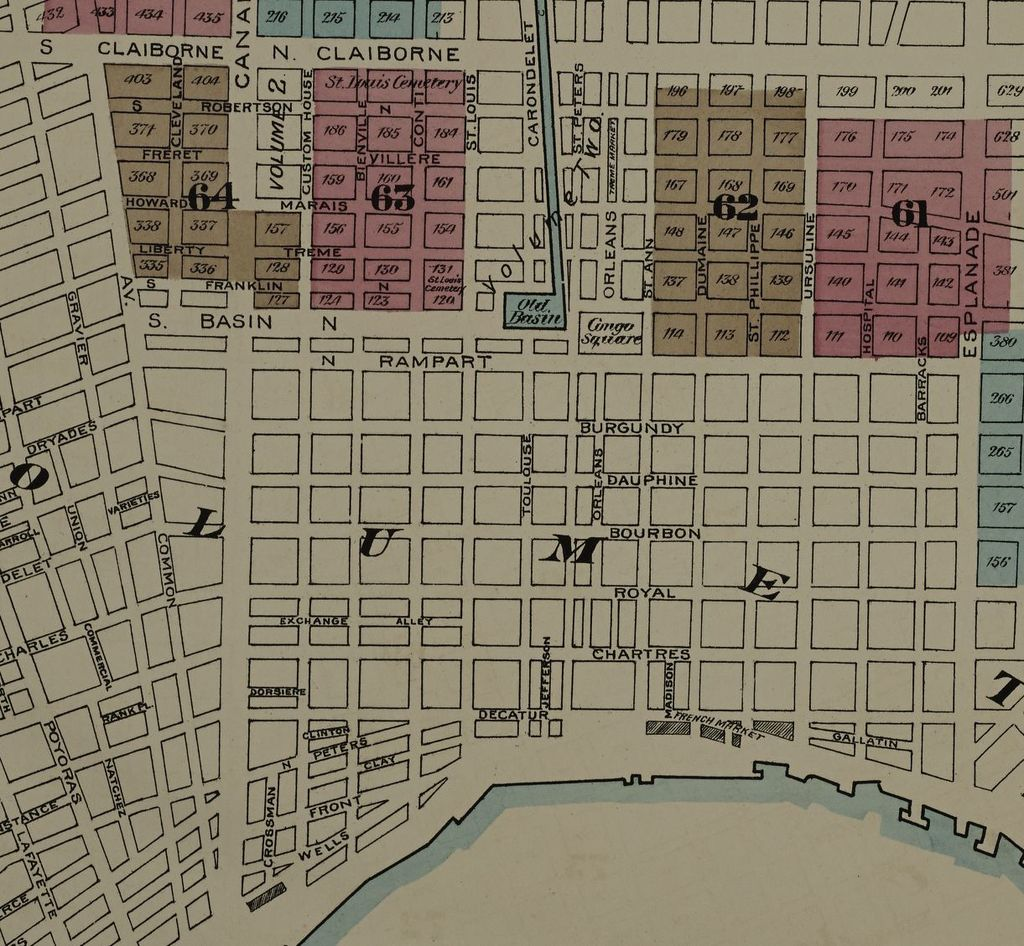
The area that would become Storyville is shown in the pink block numbered 63 on this 1887 Sanborn fire insurance map of New Orleans.

Though developed under the proposed title The District, the eventual nickname Storyville originated from City Councilman Sidney Story, who wrote the legislation and guidelines to be followed within the proposed neighborhood limits. The thirty-eight block area was bounded by Iberville, Basin Street, St. Louis, and N. Robertson streets. His vision came from port cities that legalized prostitution and was officially established on July 6, 1897. For decades most of this former district was occupied by the Iberville Housing Projects (mostly demolished), two blocks inland from the French Quarter.

The District was established to restrict prostitution to one area of the city where authorities could monitor and regulate such activity. In the late 1890s, the New Orleans city government studied the legalized red light districts of northern German and Dutch ports and set up Storyville based on such models. Between 1895 and 1915, "blue books" were published in Storyville. These books were guides to prostitution for visitors to the district wishing to use these services; they included house descriptions, prices, particular services, and the "stock" each house offered. The Storyville blue-books were inscribed with the motto: "Order of the Garter: Honi Soit Qui Mal Y Pense (Shame on Him Who Thinks Evil of It)". It took some time for Storyville to gain recognition, but by 1900, it was on its way to becoming New Orleans's largest revenue center.

Establishments in Storyville ranged from cheap "cribs" to more expensive houses, up to a row of elegant mansions along Basin Street for well-heeled customers. New Orleans' cribs were 50-cent joints, whereas the more expensive establishments could cost up to $10. Black and white brothels coexisted in Storyville; but black men were barred from legally purchasing services in either black or white brothels. Following the establishment of these brothels, restaurants and saloons began to open in Storyville, bringing in additional tourists. The District was adjacent to one of the main railway stations, where travelers arrived in the city.

At the beginning of the United States' involvement in World War I, Secretary of War Newton Baker adopted a zero-tolerance policy for immoral and indecent conduct among troops. The Army had soldiers based in New Orleans, and the city was pressed to close Storyville. Prostitution was made illegal in 1917 and Storyville was used for the purpose of entertainment. Most of its buildings were later destroyed, and in 1940 its location was used to create the Iberville housing projects.

=== The Blue Book ===
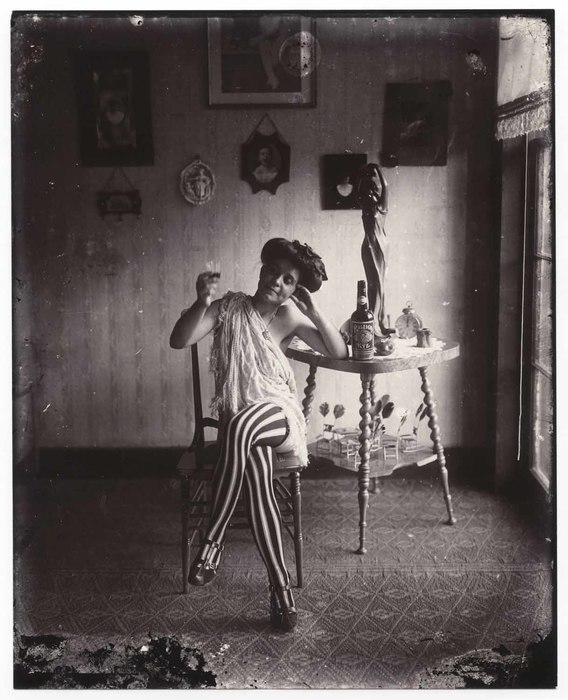
Portrait of a sex worker in Storyville. Photograph by E. J. Bellocq, 1912.

In the early 1900s, a Blue Book could be purchased for 25 cents. Blue Books were created for advertising the services of the sex workers of Storyville and included the names of working prostitutes in New Orleans. Arranged by name or address, the prostitutes were also distinguished by race and religion, with special markings for each category. Sex workers could be identified by such categories as black, white, octaroon, Jewish or French.

Landladies would be identified in bold font and information about popular houses, including interior and exterior pictures, was included. They also included advertisements for national and local cigar makers, distillers, lawyers, restaurants, drugstores, and taxi companies. The fees for general or specific services at the listed brothels were not included.

Blue Books could be purchased throughout the district in various barbershops, saloons, and railroad stations. Primarily they were sold on the corner of Basin Street and Canal Street.

The first Blue Book of Storyville was made between 1895 and 1896, but it was not until 1909 that the first popular edition was published. Billy Struve was its main producer in New Orleans. Struve, a manager of the saloon of Thomas Charles Anderson, the "Mayor of Storyville", published the books on the second floor of Lulu White's saloon on the corner of Basin Street and Bienville. Approximately sixteen editions were published until 1915.

== Notable places in Storyville ==
=== Mahogany Hall ===
Storyville contained a large variety of brothels and parlors to satisfy the diverse tastes of visitors to New Orleans. Mahogany Hall was the most lavish of them, operated by Lulu White, an important businesswoman in the district. Mahogany Hall was an octoroon hall, employing prostitutes of mixed races. It was located at 235 Basin Street.

Mahogany Hall employed roughly 40 prostitutes. Popular women of Mahogany Hall included Victoria Hall, Emma Sears, Clara Miller, Estelle Russell, Sadie Reed and Sadie Levy. Lulu White advertised these women as having beautiful figures and a gift from nature, and gained a reputation for having the best women around.

Mahogany Hall was originally called the Hall of Mirrors and was built of solid marble with a stained glass fan window over the entrance door. It had four floors, five different parlours, and fifteen bedrooms with attached bathrooms. The rooms were furnished with chandeliers, potted ferns, and elegant furniture. The house was steam-heated, and each bathroom was supplied with hot and cold water. The interiors of the rooms of Mahogany Hall filled the ads in Blue Books and other advertising pamphlets of the period.

The Hall was forced to close down in 1917 following the closure of Storyville. Originally built for $40,000, it did not sell until 1929, when it fetched just $11,000. The hall became a House for the Unemployed in the mid-1940s until 1949 when it was finally demolished. However, the significance of the Hall can be found in various museums and in the jazz tune "Mahogany Hall Stomp" by Spencer Williams.

== Notable people associated with Storyville ==
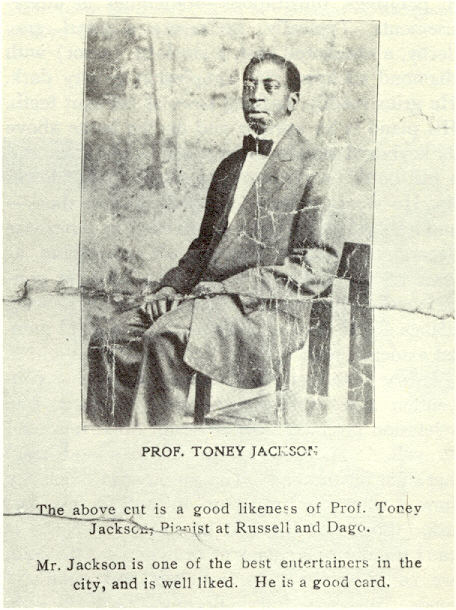
Advertising flyer for the jazz pianist Tony Jackson, c. 1910

=== Alderman Sidney Story ===
Notably the Father of Storyville, Alderman Sidney Story, an American politician, wrote the legislation to set up the District, basing his proposals around other port cities that limited prostitution. Storyville became the nation's only legal red-light district, due to Ordinance No. 13,032, which forbade any and all prostitution in New Orleans outside of a tightly defined district in 1897. The original ordinance, written by Story, read:

From the first of October, 1897 it shall be unlawful for any public prostitute or woman notoriously abandoned to lewdness to occupy, inhabit, live or sleep in any house, room or closet without the following limits: South Side of Customhouse [Iberville] from Basin to Robertson street, east side of Robertson street from Customhouse to Saint Louis street, from Robertson to Basin street.

Story's ordinance allowed the authorities to regulate prostitution without technically legalizing it.

=== Lulu White ===
Lulu White was one of the best known madams in Storyville, running and maintaining Mahogany Hall. She employed 40 prostitutes and sustained a four-story building that housed 15 bedrooms and five parlors. She often found herself in trouble with law enforcement for serving liquor without a license and was known to get violent when another intervened in her practice. Her clients were the most prominent and wealthiest men in Louisiana and she is remembered for her glamour and jewels "which were like the 'lights of the St. Louis Exposition' just as reported in her promotional booklet"

Prior to leaving New Orleans, White lost $150,000 in her investment schemes following the closure of Storyville.

=== Additional brothel proprietors ===
- Josie Arlington
- Hilma Burt
- Willie Piazza
- Kate Townsend
- Minnie White

=== Others ===
- Thomas C. Anderson, Louisiana state legislator
- Louis Armstrong, musician and composer
- E. J. Bellocq, photographer
- Buddy Bolden, jazz musician
- Ann Cook, blues singer
- Tony Jackson, musician
- Jelly Roll Morton, musician and composer
- Jimmie Noone, musician
- Joe "King" Oliver, musician
- Pops Foster, jazz musician
- Alcide Nunez, musician

== Music ==
The complexity that occurred during the development of jazz music was filled with chaos, violence, and an intensity that left an unmistakable mark on Storyville New Orleans. A course of sequences within different colonial control brought on by the French, Spanish, and Anglo-Americans, created a mixed musical atmosphere all over the city. This musical blending gave musicians from different backgrounds the opportunity to perform in the saloons, brothels, dance clubs, and cribs of Storyville.

At the creation of Storyville, black and white musicians were segregated. The red-light district first opened to African Americans who brought their musical background with them. Attributions in the structure of; the Bamboula Rhythm - which is present in Jelly Roll Morton's song "Spanish Tinge", Call and Response conversation of first and second voices in New Orleans jazz, vocalization of drums in African drum orchestra - which transfers to instruments in early jazz, and improvisation that is present in west and central African music that persists in jazz today. The syncopated beat is a particular feature also linked to African music traditions that provided an influence to musicians within Storyville. As time went on and white musicians started to enter Storyville, they increasingly were influenced by black performers. The segregation slowly started to diminish, and sharing their common interest brought the races together in some informal musical ventures. Bands signed to labels remained segregated.

Musicians were hired by madams (owners of the brothel houses) to entertain clients within the mansion's parlors. These audiences tended to not be very critical, giving performers the freedom to experiment with their musical styles. Performers such as Jelly Roll Morton, and Manuel Manetta played piano all times of the day and night, which was customary within these brothel houses. At the same time dance halls and saloons would hold the attention of their patrons with ragtime dance bands. The experimentation and technique advancement within Storyville made its style exceptional during this time in history.

With the closing of Storyville in 1917, the New Orleans musicians who had relied on the district for employment were still able to develop their style and evolve within the New Orleans tourism industry. The appeal of music and vice gave New Orleans favorable money-making conditions and opportunities to play on riverboats and tours. Some of the musicians did leave the city, spreading their musical talents and knowledge to other cities such as Chicago expanding the rhythms of jazz across the United States.

== Closure ==
In 1908, a train-route connecting Canal and Basin Street was completed, centralizing the location of Storyville in New Orleans. This new train station was located adjacent to the District, leading to citizens' groups protesting its continuance. Prostitutes, often naked, would wave to the train's passengers from their balconies.

At the beginning of World War I, it was ordered that a brothel could not be located within five miles of a military base. The US Navy, driven by a reformist attitude at home, prohibited soldiers from frequenting prostitutes, based on public health. In October 1917, shortly after the United States entered World War I, Secretary of War Newton D. Baker said:

These boys are going to France. I want them adequately armed and clothed by their government; but I want them to have an invisible armor to take with them... a moral and intellectual armor for their protection overseas.

Aided by the campaigns of the American Social Hygiene Organization, and with army regulations that placed such institutes off limits, he implemented a national program to close so-called "segregated zones" close to Army training camps.

In the early days of the war, four soldiers were killed within the district within weeks of each other. The Army and Navy demanded that Storyville be closed down, with the Secretary of the Navy Josephus Daniels citing the district as a "bad influence".

The New Orleans city government strongly protested against closing the district; New Orleans Mayor Martin Behrman said, "You can make it illegal, but you can't make it unpopular." He then ordered the District be shut down by midnight of November 12, 1917. After that time, separate black and white underground houses of prostitution were set up around the city.

The district continued in a more subdued state as an entertainment center through the 1920s, with various dance halls, cabarets and restaurants. Speakeasies, gambling joints and prostitution were also regularly found in the area despite repeated police raids. Prostitution was deemed illegal and came to an end at midnight on November 12, 1917.

== Storyville today ==
Almost all the buildings in the former District were demolished in the 1930s during the Great Depression for construction of public housing, known as the Iberville Projects. While much of the area contained old and decayed buildings, the old mansions along Basin Street, some of the finest structures in the city, were also levelled. The city government wanted to change the area by demolition and new construction. Basin Street was renamed "North Saratoga" (its historic name was restored some 20 years later).

Today there are three known buildings that still exist from the Storyville time period: Lulu White's Saloon, Joe Victor's Saloon, and Tark "Terry" Musa's store, formerly known as Frank Early's Saloon.

== Representation in media ==
- The New Orleans Storyville Museum is a public museum in the French Quarter dedicated to the history of the infamous red-light district, and contains many artifacts including original copies of the Blue Book.
- Storyville prominently features as a backdrop in Valiant's line of Shadowman comics.
- The graphic novel Storyville: The Prostitute Murders by Gary Reed and published by Caliber Comics is a historical crime drama set in the district in 1910.
- William J. Toye said he painted several works of Storyville, but they were damaged less than two weeks before he was to exhibit them in 1969.
- A collection of photographs by E. J. Bellocq, a turn of the century photographer, were discovered in the mid-twentieth century. He had portrayed many Storyville prostitutes. His work was published in 1971 for the first time, under the title Storyville Portraits.
- Films with fictional portrayals of Storyville have included New Orleans (1947), Pretty Baby (1978), and Storyville (1992).
- In Michael Moorcock's History of the Runestaff the city of Narleen is intended to be a post-apocalyptic New Orleans, with the city-within-a-city of Starvel meant to be Storyville.
- David Fulmer has set five mystery novels—Chasing the Devil's Tail, Jass, Rampart Street, Lost River, and The Iron Angel—in Storyville circa 1907–1915.
- Anne Rice's novel The Witching Hour mentions Storyville in the chapters regarding Julien Mayfair.
- A musical called Storyville in tribute to the historic New Orleans district is performed by the York Theatre Company, with the play written by Ed Bullins and the music and lyrics written by Mildred Kayden.
- The 2022 television adaptation of Anne Rice's novel Interview with the Vampire recasts the character of Louis de Pointe du Lac as a black Creole brothel owner in Storyville in the early 20th century. Several notable scenes from the series take place there and are shot on-location in New Orleans.

== See also ==
- New Orleans Storyville Museum
- Free State of Galveston
- New Orleans, a film (1947)
- San Antonio Sporting District
- Omaha Sporting District
- Yoshiwara
