= Frances Faye =

American singer and pianist (1912–1991)

- Born: November 4, 1912; Brooklyn, New York, U.S.
- Died: November 8, 1991 (aged 79)
- Occupations: Singer, pianist
- Partner: Teri Shepherd

Frances Faye (November 4, 1912 – November 8, 1991) was an American cabaret and show tune singer and pianist. Born to a working-class Jewish family in Brooklyn, New York City, she was a second cousin of Danny Kaye.

== Career ==
Born as Frances Cohen, Faye's showbiz career began at the age of 15 in nightclubs where she first became a star. She appeared in one Bing Crosby film; Double or Nothing singing "After You". She wrote the song "Well All Right" recorded by the Andrews Sisters. Faye made her solo recording debut in 1936. Her act became famous for including double entendres and references to homosexuality and lesbianism. Faye herself was bisexual and hinted at this frequently in her act; she would often playfully alter pronouns in love songs or weave her girlfriend's name into lyrics of song. For instance, she inserted "it's a Teri, Teri day" into "The Man I Love" and on national television sang "why do all the boys treat Teri so right" in "I Wish I Could Shimmy Like My Sister Kate."

She recorded about a dozen albums for many different record labels, including Capitol Records and Imperial Records and jazz labels Verve Records and Bethlehem Records.

== Personal life ==
Faye was married twice in the 1940s. In the late 1950s, a woman named Teri Shepherd became her manager and lifelong partner. Shepherd discussed her relationship with Faye in Bruce Weber's 2001 film Chop Suey.

== Later life ==
Faye was arrested in 1955 on a narcotics charge in Los Angeles; police asserted that she and the three men arrested at the same time possessed marijuana.

During the 1960s, Faye suffered a number of health related problems brought on by a hip accident in 1958. She nevertheless continued to tour into the early 1980s. Peter Allen credited her as a major influence and had Faye sing the backing vocals on the track 9 reprise of "Just a Gigolo (Schoner Gigolo)" on his 1974 album, Continental American.

She returned to film in 1978, playing an elderly cocaine-sniffing madam in the Louis Malle film Pretty Baby. She retired shortly afterwards. At the time of her death in 1991, aged 79, she was living with Shepherd.

== Discography ==
=== Singles ===
- "No Regrets" / "You're Not the Kind of a Boy" (Decca – 1936)
- "Boogie Woogie Washer Woman" / "Return to Sorrento" (International – 1946)
- "Personality" / "Drunk with Love & Purple Wine" / "Well All Right" (International – 1946)
- "All That Glitters Is Not Gold" / "I Can't Believe That You're in Love with Me" (International – 1946)
- "Night and Day" / "Tweet Tweet Tweetheart" (Capitol #2224 – c. 1953)
- "She Looks" / "I Wish I Could Shimmy Like My Sister Kate" (Capitol #2278 – c. 1953)
- "My Last Affair" / "On a Raft in the Middle of an Ocean" (Capitol #2347 – c. 1954)
- "There's a Bell That Rings in My Heart" / "A Fool in Love" (Capitol #2390 – c. 1954)
- "Sometimes I'm Happy" / "I Was Wrong About You" (Capitol #2472 – c. 1954)
- "The Dummy Song" / "Uh-Huh" (Capitol #2542 – c. 1954)
- "Hey, Mister" / "Sorry Baby" (Capitol #2604 – c. 1954)
- "Summertime" / "Mad About the Boy" (Capitol #2842 – c. 1955)
- "Somebody Loves Me" / "Lonesome Road" (Bethlehem 45-11002 – 1958)
- "Night and Day" / "Frances and Her Friends" (GNP No. 149 – 1959)
- "It's You I Love" / "My Blue Heaven" (Imperial #5546 – 1959)
- "Sweet Georgia Brown" / "You're Heavenly" (Regina R-1322)
- "Willow Weep For Me" / "Comin' Home Baby"(Audio Fidelity)

=== Albums ===
- Frances Faye (International, 1946)
- No Reservations (Capitol T-522, 1953)
- I'm Wild Again (Bethlehem BCP-23, 1955)
- Relaxin' With Frances Faye (Bethlehem BCP-62, 1956)
- Porgy and Bess (Bethlehem 3-LP set; with Mel Torme, 1956)
- Frances Faye Sings Folk Songs (Bethlehem BCP-6017, 1957)
- Frances Faye Swings Fats Domino (Imperial 9059, 1959)
- Frances Faye Sings the Blues (Imperial 9158, 1960)
- Caught in the Act (GNP 41, 1959) Live recording at the Crescendo, Hollywood; with Jack Costanzo
- Frances Faye in Frenzy (Verve, 1961)
- Swinging All the Way With Frances Faye (Verve V-2147, 1962)
- Caught in the Act, Vol. 2 (GNP 92, 1963) Live recording at the Thunderbird, Las Vegas
- You Gotta Go! Go! Go! (Regina R-315, 1964)
- Bad, Bad Frances Faye (Bethlehem, 1976; reissue of I'm Wild Again with cover art from Relaxin' With Frances Faye)

=== Filmography ===
- Double or Nothing (1937)
- Pretty Baby (1978)
- Chop Suey (2001) archival clips and interviews
