= Josie Arlington =

American brothel owner

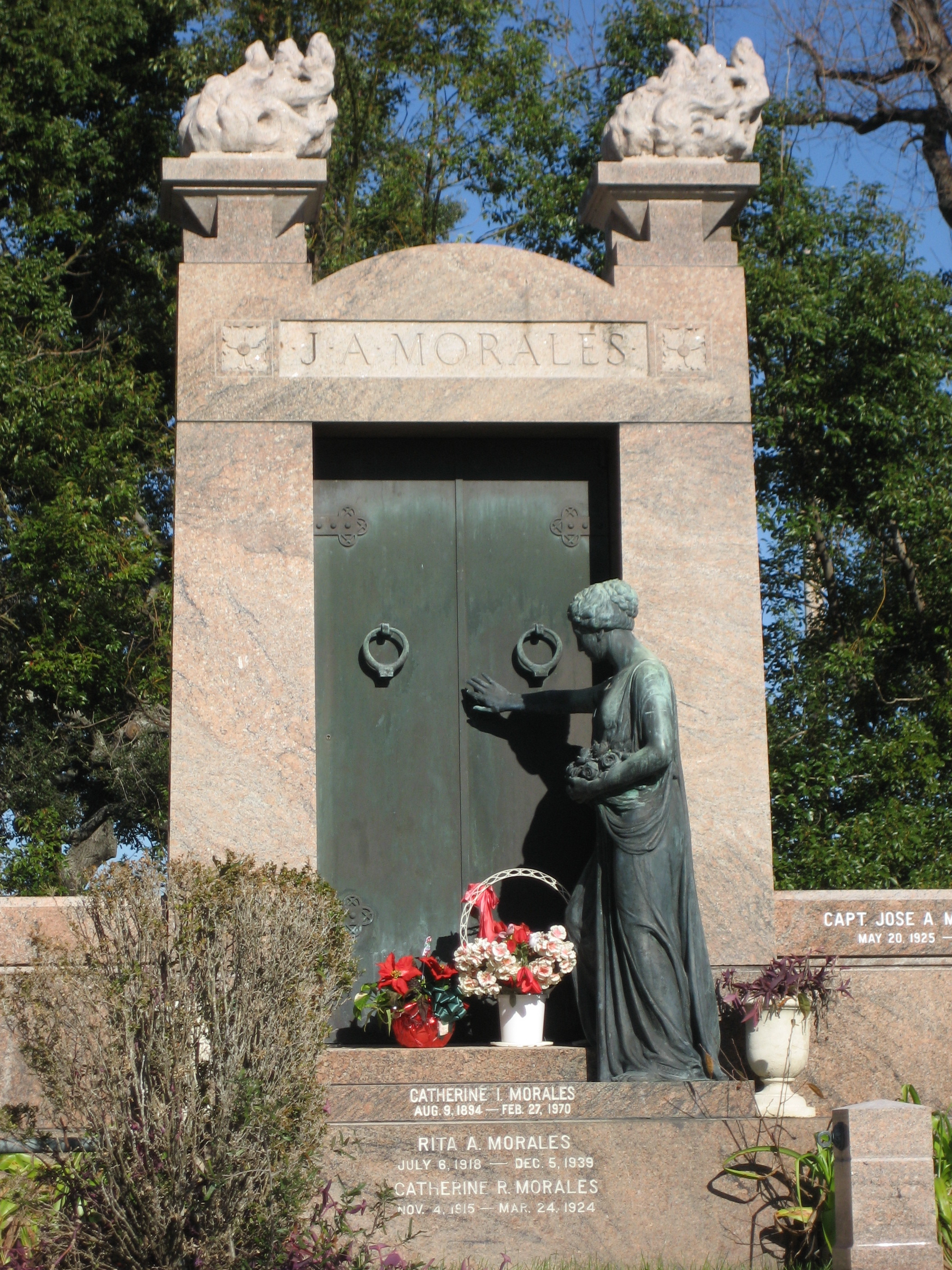
- Metairie Cemetery tomb originally of Josie Arlington
- Born: Mary Deubler; 1864; New Orleans, Louisiana, US
- Died: February 14, 1914 (aged 49–50)
- Resting place: Metairie Cemetery, New Orleans
- Occupations: Prostitute, brothel madam

Josie Arlington (1864 – February 14, 1914) was a brothel madam in the Storyville district of New Orleans, Louisiana. Arlington started her life as a prostitute at 17–18 years old as a means to support her family. Arlington used her experience to open a brothel in 1890, which she named "Chateau Lobrano d'Arlington". Shortly after Storyville was established as the red-light district for New Orleans, Arlington moved her business into this area. After her building was destroyed by fire in 1905 she moved her business into a saloon owned by Tom Anderson, which was known as 'The Arlington Annex'. Josie retired from the business in 1909 and sold her assets off to Tom Anderson. Arlington died in 1914 and was buried in Metairie Cemetery, where her grave had to be moved because it had become such a tourist attraction.

== Early life ==
Arlington was born Mary Deubler in New Orleans to German parents. Although shrewd, Arlington was known to be short-tempered and violent. She began working as a prostitute in 1881, supporting her family on her earnings, and opened a brothel at 172 Customhouse Street prior to the murder of her brother Peter Deubler in November 1890. At that point, Miss Mary Deubler was also using the surname of Mrs. Phillip Lobrano for professional purposes. She had been with Lobrano since the age of 16 when he had offered her protection. Mr. Lobrano and Peter Deubler had a drunken verbal altercation, and Peter had followed Lobrano from a bar to the Custom street premises. While the witness accounts were disputed for years, Phillip Lobrano claimed that he shot Peter Deubler in the face in front of his sister Josie in self-defense. Peter died December 9, 1890, ten days after being shot. On March 31, 1892, Phillip Lobrano was acquitted after a second trial. In the meantime Josie had cut all business and romantic dealings with Lobrano, and had sought to become more respectable.

Josie's decisions helped her business-wise. In the four or five years from her brother's death, she had shed her former reputation. She had taken a new paramour, John Thomas "Tom" Brady who was a clerk in the City Treasurers office. She and Brady had visited the Arlington Hotel in Hot Springs, Arkansas and she witnessed first hand a luxurious lifestyle and resolved to emulate it back at her brothel. She changed the name to the "Chateau Lobrano d'Arlington" and began to hire foreign girls to increase the appeal to upscale customers. At this point, she began making business deals with Tom Anderson who operated a nearby restaurant which he renamed the Arlington.

Anderson caught wind of Alderman Story's ordinance to create a regulated prostitution district before most did, and he and Josie acquired choice properties on Basin Street near the entrance to the future Storyville area.

== Storyville era ==
In 1898, when Storyville was established, Arlington moved her operations to a four-story frame mansion at 225 North Basin Street. The house, now demolished, can be easily identified by its distinctive onion-domed cupola. Its renovation reportedly cost $5,000.

The establishment, formally named Chateau Lobrano d'Arlington but locally known as The Arlington, was known for its opulence. As an expensive "$5.00 House", it offered about ten or twelve girls at any time, as well as a live sex 'circus' that could be viewed for an extra fee. Though it had a reputation for depravity, Josie claimed that no virgin was ever defiled or exploited by her business.

The Arlington was damaged in a fire in 1905. The madam and her girls were taken in temporarily by Tom Anderson, a saloon keeper and friend/lover of Arlington. Anderson's establishment gained the nickname 'The Arlington Annex' as a result. Arlington closed the business in 1909 and retired. Many of her assets were bought by Tom Anderson.

== Death and burial ==
Arlington died in 1914 and was buried at Metairie Cemetery, in a tomb designed by Albert Weiblen. The grave features a bronze female figure which has been said to leave its post at the door of the monument and walk around the other graves. The mausoleum quickly became a tourist attraction, which left Arlington's family mortified. The body was later moved to another location within the same cemetery.

The monument still stands, and deceased members of the Morales family are now held within it. The bronze female figure is thought to symbolize a virginal girl being turned away from the Arlington door, following Arlington's claim in life that no woman's innocence was taken on the grounds of her establishment.

== In popular culture ==
Madam: A Novel of New Orleans by Cari Lynn and Kellie Martin (Penguin/Plume, 2014) is based on the story of Mary Deubler's rise to become Madam Josie Arlington.
