= Iberville Projects =

- New Orleans Neighborhood
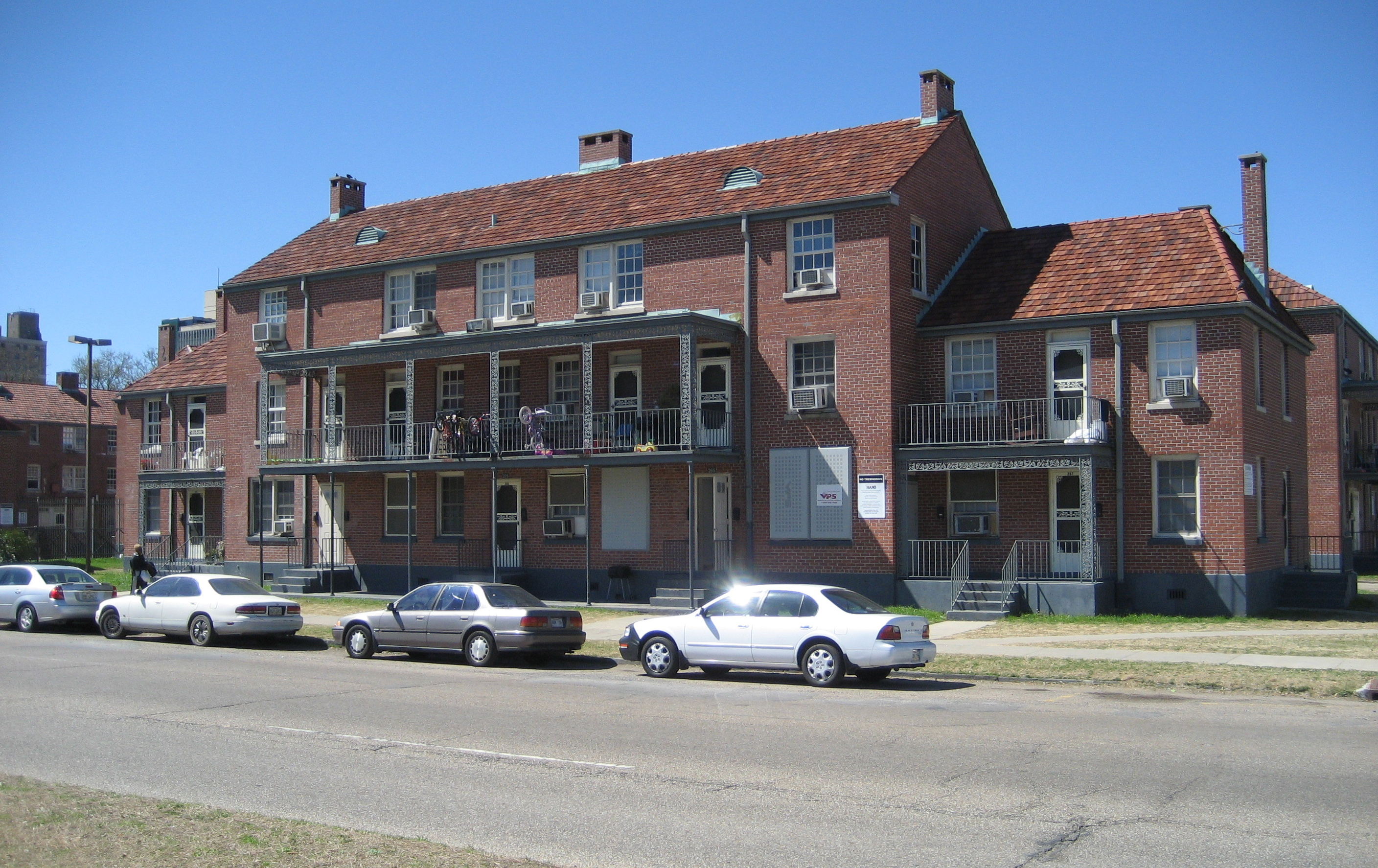
- Iberville Projects on Basin Street
- Interactive map of Iberville Projects
- Coordinates: 29°57′34″N 90°04′25″W
- Country: United States
- State: Louisiana
- City: New Orleans
- Planning District: District 4, Mid-City District

Area
  - Total: 0.06 sq mi (0.16 km^{2})
  - Land: 0.06 sq mi (0.16 km^{2})
  - Water: 0.00 sq mi (0 km^{2})
- Elevation: 0 ft (0 m)

Population (2010)
  - Total: 1,238
  - Density: 21,000/sq mi (8,000/km^{2})
- Time zone: UTC-6 (CST)
  - Summer (DST): UTC-5 (CDT)
- Area code: 504

Iberville Projects was a neighborhood in the city of New Orleans and one of the low-income Housing Projects of New Orleans. The Iberville was the last of the New Deal-era public housing remaining in the city. Its boundaries were St. Louis Street, Basin Street, Iberville Street, and North Claiborne Avenue. It is located in the 6th ward of downtown New Orleans, on the former site of the Storyville district (the city's official red-light district). The area has recently been redeveloped into a modernized apartment complex called the Bienville Basin Apartments.

== History ==
=== 20th century ===
The Iberville development was built on a ten-block site in the early 1940s as part of the Wagner Bill. The land was previously Storyville, the city's official red light district. In 1940, the city declared 95% of the structures in Storyville substandard, clearing the way for construction of the project. There were 858 units in the Iberville Project.

The call for public housing was met by the federal government with the U.S. Housing Act of 1937 while the Great Depression was taking a toll on the poor and unemployed in America. The government officials in New Orleans were the quickest to act and immediately received the funding to build the initial six housing complexes in the city. Once the complexes were complete they were divided among the whites and blacks in the city with the blacks having four of the complexes in the less developed areas of the city. The Iberville Project was one of the two housing complexes the whites were given, named in honor of Pierre Le Moyne, sieur, d’Iberville, one of the founders of Louisiana. During segregation, the Iberville was occupied by whites, while the nearby Lafitte Projects served the black tenants.

Beginning in the late 1980s, when many cities were regenerating and real estate in downtown areas became ripe for private investment, developers began looking to redo the 23-acre Iberville project. In 2001, Tom Benson (owner of the New Orleans Saints) proposed tearing down Iberville and putting up a stadium. Then, in 2004, developer Pres Kabacoff proposed partially demolishing the project in order to reinvigorate the city's tourism economy and the urban core.

=== 21st century ===
Although there was no significant damage, the Iberville project was closed following Hurricane Katrina. Representative Richard Baker (a Republican from a wealthy area of Baton Rouge) said after Hurricane Katrina: "We finally cleaned up public housing in New Orleans. We couldn't do it. But God did."

New Orleans mayor Ray Nagin expressed a desire to redevelop the Iberville Projects in 2003. In May 2009, Nagin announced a HANO (Housing Authority of New Orleans) proposal to raze part of the Iberville project for redevelopment into mixed-income housing. In 2011, HANO and the city of New Orleans were granted $30.5 million by the U.S. Department of Housing. The grant was for improving the neighborhood's sustainability and increasing access to high-quality services. The 1937 Housing Act made it possible for politicians and bureaucrats to demolish five thousand units of public housing in the midst of a staggering post-disaster housing crisis. Due to its close proximity to Canal Street French Quarter, tourist regularly wandered across Basin Street into the project and were often assaulted. Others were led there by residents and robbed. Los Angeles Times article published in 2006 stated "before Hurricane Katrina hit, the Iberville was as an extremely dangerous place."

Demolition of the Iberville Housing projects commenced in September 2013, with mixed-income housing being incorporated into the street grid of the surrounding neighborhoods. Human remains were found on a significant portion of the site, delaying redevelopment plans for months. These areas will be made into green space.

According to Mayor Mitch Landrieu, the Iberville Projects were redeveloped because of the location. Landrieu stated in the New Orleans Advocate that "This particular development, because of where it is — it is immediately adjacent to the Treme neighborhood, next to Canal Street, next to Rampart, next to the Claiborne corridor, across the street from what hopefully will be the new City Hall — that's all kinds of great promise." The renovation of Iberville Projects was executed in phases and created a total of 880 units catering to the needs of those who use affordable housing and housing units for the elderly. The renovations of the projects are a part of the U.S. Department of Housing and Urban Development's Choice Neighborhood Initiative and a program HUD developed to help change the inner-city into an area with schools, jobs, mixed-income families, and transportation.

The redevelopment also called for a revamp of the entire surrounding neighborhood including corner stores, landmarks, and schools in a 300-square-block area bounded by Rampart Street, Tulane Avenue, Broad Street and St. Bernard Avenue. The remaining buildings from the original project were added to the National Register of Historic Places on January 5, 2015.

=== Architecture ===
The Iberville Project consisted of seventy-five brick buildings with 858 apartments. It was designed to blend in with the old neighborhood's housing in terms of proportionality, size, and style, resembling rowhouses of the 19th century with gabled ends, galleries, chimneys, and ironwork. The Iberville project was considered the most aesthetically pleasing HANO project in New Orleans. James Russell, and architectural journalist for Bloomberg News said: "In New Orleans, public housing doesn't mean bleak high-rise towers. The city has thousands of units with Georgian brickwork and lacy ironwork porches that came through Hurricane Katrina barely scathed."

=== Demographics ===
As of the census of 2000, there were 2,540 people, 830 households, and 689 families residing in the neighborhood. The population density was 42,333 /mi^{2} (12,700 /km^{2}). When the projects in New Orleans were racially integrated in the 1960s, low-income whites had options available to move to the suburbs, but their African American counterparts did not. As with all of the New Orleans projects, Iberville became home to thousands of the city's poorest African Americans. In 2000, 76 percent of the households in the Iberville made less than $10,000 per year.

As of the census of 2010, there were 1,238 people, 482 households, and 295 families residing in the neighborhood.

The median age in this area is 31.3 and the area population is 3,655.

Some of the schools near the area that was once called Iberville Projects are Joseph S. Clark Preparatory High School, the former Mcdonough 35 (no longer there since January 2016) Albert Wicker elementary school (being renovated since 2018) and Craig elementary school.

== Geography ==
The Iberville Projects were located at 29°57′34″N 90°04′25″W at an elevation of 0 feet (0 m) (mean sea level). According to the United States Census Bureau, the district has a total area of 0.06 square miles (0.2 km^{2}), all of which is land.

The New Orleans City Planning Commission defines the boundaries of Iberville Projects as these streets: St. Louis Street to the north, Basin Street to the east, Iberville Street to the south and North Claiborne Avenue to the west.

== Adjacent neighborhoods ==
- Tremé (north)
- French Quarter (east)
- Central Business District (south)
- Tulane/Gravier (west)
