= E. J. Bellocq =

American photographer (1873–1949)

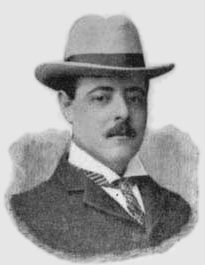
- Bellocq in 1898
- Born: Jean Ernest Joseph Bellocq; August 19, 1873; New Orleans, Louisiana, U.S.
- Died: October 3, 1949 (aged 76); New Orleans, Louisiana, U.S.
- Resting place: Saint Louis Cemetery
- Education: College of the Immaculate Conception
- Occupation: Photographer
- Years active: 1917–1949

Ernest Joseph Bellocq (19 August 1873 – 3 October 1949) was an American professional photographer who worked in New Orleans during the early 20th century. Bellocq is remembered for his haunting photographs of the prostitutes of Storyville, New Orleans' legalized red-light district. These have inspired novels, poems and films.

== Early life ==
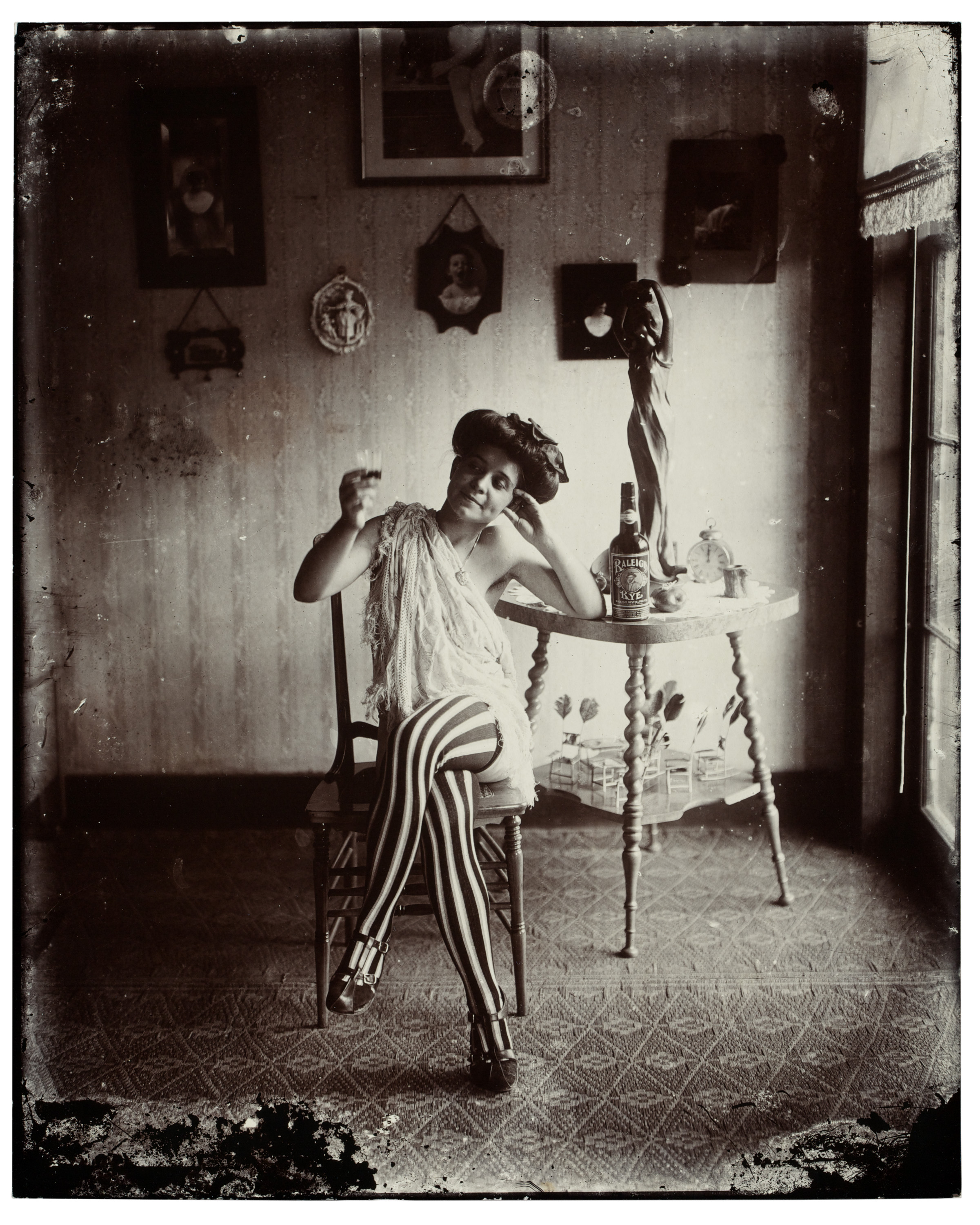
One of Bellocq's Storyville photographs, c. 1912.

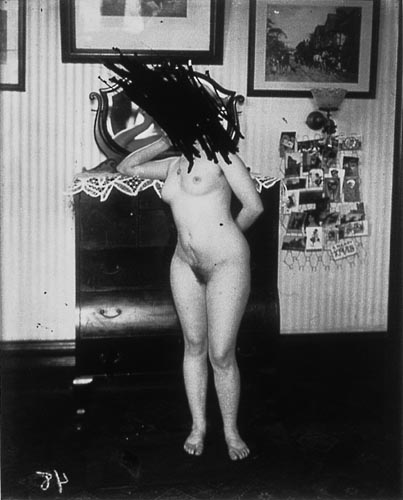
One of the deliberately damaged Storyville photographs.

Ernest John Bellocq was born in 1872 and baptised at the Church of the Immaculate Conception in New Orleans. He was raised in an aristocratic white Creole family in the French Quarter. His father, Paul, worked as a bookkeeper and later as secretary and treasurer for a wholesale firm. His mother, Marie, was the daughter of a wealthy French merchant. The family employed a nurse and lived in comfortable circumstances near the French Opera House. Ernest's younger brother, Leo, would later become a Jesuit priest.

Bellocq completed 10 years of classical education at the College of the Immaculate Conception.

== Career ==
After his education, his father secured him a position at his firm. He subsequently moved between jobs as a bookkeeper and clerk at various businesses in and around the French Quarter. By 1898, the year Storyville (New Orleans' legally sanctioned prostitution district) opened, Bellocq had become recognized as one of the city's up-and-coming amateur photographers. A local publication that year identified him as a descendant of one of the city's most prominent Creole families.

In 1902, his mother died. Around this time, Bellocq left employment and committed himself to photography as a profession. He established a commercial studio, at one point operating from Canal Street. During the First World War, he worked for a period as an industrial photographer for a shipbuilding company. His commercial work included architecture, class portraits, grave plots, and copy work for museums.

During the early 1900s, Bellocq undertook a private photographic project in Storyville, carrying an 8 x 10-inch view camera to document the women working there. He kept this project confidential from almost everyone, sharing it with only a small number of close associates. The project produced glass negative plates, some of which show the same subject photographed twice, clothed and unclothed. A number of the negatives were defaced, with the women's faces scratched from the emulsion. Later examination by Lee Friedlander suggested the scratching occurred while the emulsion was still wet, indicating Bellocq himself was likely responsible, having done so shortly after developing the plates.

== Later life ==
In his later years, Bellocq lived in a small furnished apartment at 619 Dumaine Street in the French Quarter, subsisting on a small annuity. He maintained a daily routine of walking to camera shops around the city, visiting a bus station for lunch, and frequenting the local Kodak store, where he was known to fall asleep in a chair. He maintained several forgotten bank accounts at various institutions, with balances ranging from a little over a dollar to more than six hundred. His health declined, and a doctor described him as senile in his final period. He was noted for wearing a piece of rope as a belt and appearing dishevelled in his old age.

== Death and legacy ==
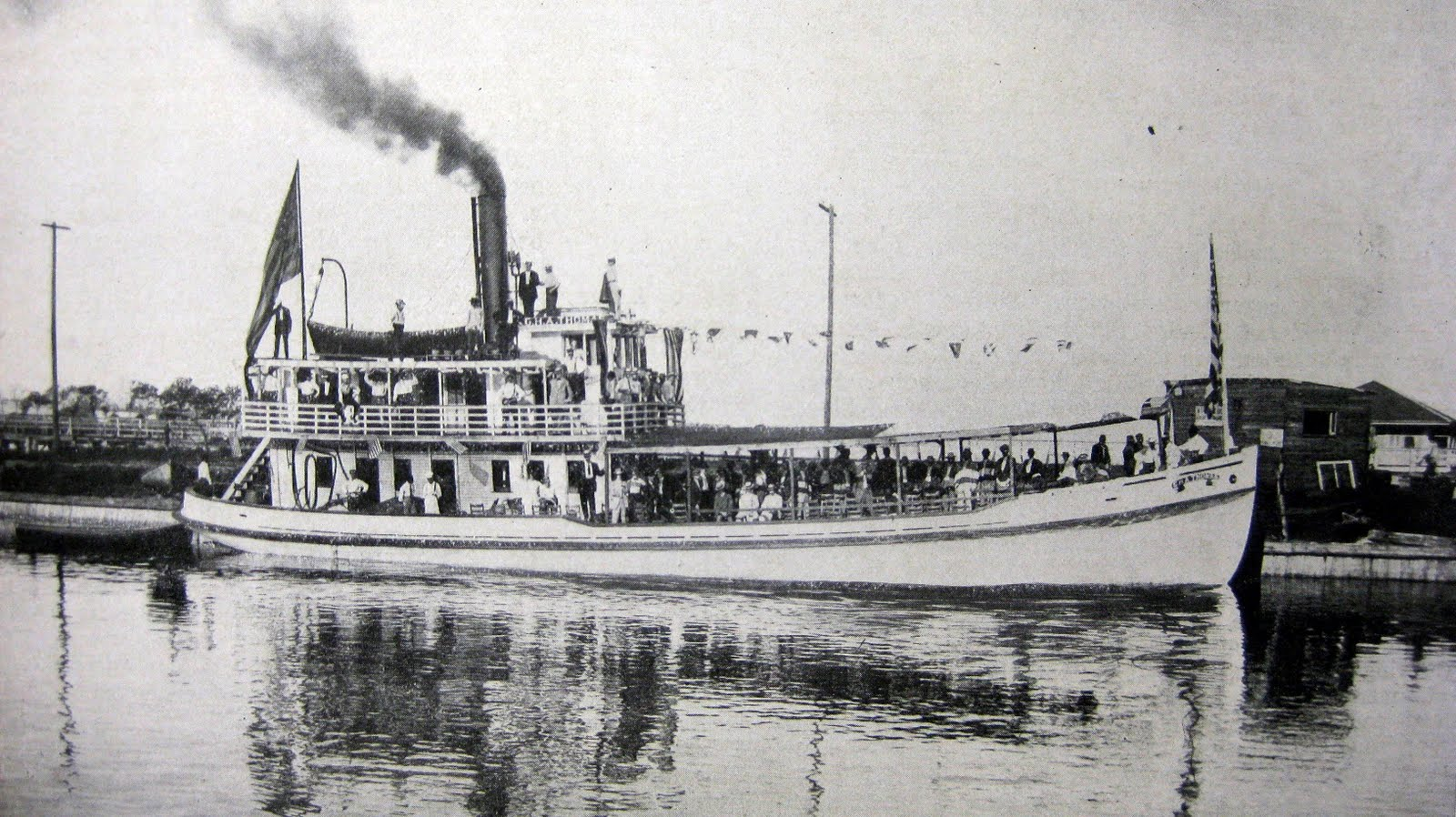
Photo of steamer launched in New Basin Canal for excursion to Lake Pontchartrain's north shore, August 19, 1908, photo by E. J. Bellocq

In late September 1949, at the age of seventy-six, Bellocq collapsed on Baronne Street and sustained a head wound. He was taken to Charity Hospital, where he was unable to provide information to doctors. He was subsequently transferred to Mercy Hospital, where his brother Leo was identified as next of kin. He died there of cerebral arteriosclerosis, diabetes, obesity, concussion, senility, and old age. He was buried on 4 October 1949 in the family tomb at Saint Louis Cemetery No. 3 in New Orleans.

Following his death, a notary examined his safe deposit box, which contained no will, along with a locket, diamond rings with Tiffany settings, broken watches, jewellery, and a rosary. His apartment contained broken furniture and damaged photographic equipment. The Storyville glass negatives were not listed in the succession, as the images were considered pornographic and illegal at the time. Leo Bellocq was his sole heir. The negatives eventually made their way to Sal Ruiz's antique shop, and later to Larry Borenstein, who stored them in deteriorated conditions behind Preservation Hall. Some of the plates sustained water damage during Hurricane Betsy. In 1967, photographer Lee Friedlander acquired the plates and began printing from them. In 1970, a show of Friedlander's posthumous prints on gold tone printing out paper from Bellocq's 8" x 10" glass negatives were mounted by curator John Szarkowski at the Museum of Modern Art in Manhattan. A more extensive collection of Friedlander's prints, entitled Bellocq: Photographs from Storyville, was published with an introduction by Susan Sontag in 1996.

The E. J. Bellocq Gallery of Photography at Louisiana Tech University is named in his honor.

== The Storyville photographs ==
All the photographs are portraits of women. Some are nude, some dressed, others posed as if acting a mysterious narrative. Many of the negatives were badly damaged, in part deliberately, which encouraged speculation. Many of the faces had been scraped out; whether this was done by Bellocq, his Jesuit priest brother who inherited them after E. J.'s death or someone else is unknown. Bellocq is the most likely candidate, since the damage was done while the emulsion was still wet. In a few photographs the women wore masks.

Some prints made by Bellocq have since surfaced. These are far more conventional than the prints made by Friedlander.

The Storyville photographs not only serve as a record of the prostitutes, but also the interiors of the businesses that housed them.

== In popular culture ==
The mystique about Bellocq has inspired several fictional versions of his life, notably Louis Malle's 1978 film Pretty Baby, in which Bellocq was played by Keith Carradine. He also appears in Michael Ondaatje's novel Coming Through Slaughter and is a protagonist in Peter Everett's novel Bellocq's Women. These works take many liberties with the facts of Bellocq's life.

The photographs have inspired imaginative literature about the women in them. There are several collections of poems, notably Brooke Bergan's Storyville: A Hidden Mirror and Natasha Trethewey's Bellocq's Ophelia.

The 1974 book Storyville, New Orleans: Being an Authentic, Illustrated Account of the Notorious Red-Light District by Al Rose gives an overview of the history of prostitution in New Orleans with many photographs by Bellocq.

In 1971, Storyville Portraits won a mention at the Rencontres d'Arles's Book Award, France.

The 1983 novel Fat Tuesday by R. Wright Campbell features a thinly veiled depiction of Bellocq, a photographer named B.E. Locque.
