= Pretty Baby (1978 film) =

American historical drama by Louis Malle

- Theatrical release poster
- Directed by: Louis Malle
- Screenplay by: Polly Platt
- Story by: Polly Platt; Louis Malle
- Produced by: Louis Malle
- Starring: Brooke Shields; Keith Carradine; Susan Sarandon
- Cinematography: Sven Nykvist
- Edited by: Suzanne Fenn
- Music by: Ferdinand Morton
- Distributed by: Paramount Pictures
- Release date: April 5, 1978 (U.S.)
- Running time: 109 minutes
- Country: United States
- Language: English
- Budget: $3 million
- Box office: $5.8 million(us/ca rentals)

Pretty Baby is a 1978 American historical drama film directed by Louis Malle, written by Polly Platt, and starring Brooke Shields, Keith Carradine, and Susan Sarandon. Set in 1917, it focuses on a 12-year-old girl being raised in a brothel in Storyville, the red-light district of New Orleans, by her prostitute mother. Barbara Steele, Diana Scarwid, and Antonio Fargas appear in supporting roles. The film is based on the true account of a young girl who was sexually exploited by being groomed to engage in prostitution as a child, a theme that was recounted in historian Al Rose's 1974 book Storyville, New Orleans: Being an Authentic Illustrated Account of the Notorious Red-Light District. It is also based on the life of photographer Ernest Bellocq, who photographed New Orleans prostitutes in the early 20th century. The title, Pretty Baby, is derived from the Tony Jackson song of the same name, which is featured on the film's soundtrack.

The project marked Malle's first American film production, as his previous works had been produced in his native France. Filming took place on-location in New Orleans in the spring of 1977.

The film was released theatrically in the United States in April 1978 and screened at the 1978 Cannes Film Festival, where it was nominated for the Palme d'Or, winning the Technical Grand Prize. Ferdinand Morton's score also earned the film an Academy Award nomination for Best Music. Although the film itself was mostly praised by critics, it caused significant public outcry and media controversy due to its depiction of child sexual exploitation, as well as the nude and semi-nude scenes featuring Shields, who was 11 years old at the time of filming, and whose character was a child being exploited for prostitution.

== Plot ==
In 1917, during the final months of legal prostitution in Storyville, the red-light district of New Orleans, Louisiana, Hattie is a prostitute living and working in an elegant brothel run by the elderly, cocaine-addicted Madame Nell. Hattie has given birth to a baby boy and has a 12-year-old daughter named Violet. When photographer Ernest Bellocq arrives with his camera, aiming to document the sex workers, Hattie and Violet are the only people awake at the time; Madame Nell agrees to let him photograph them after he offers to pay her.

Bellocq becomes a fixture in the brothel, photographing the women but mostly the child, Hattie. His photographic activities fascinate the precocious Violet, who believes that he is falling in love with her mother, making her somewhat jealous. Violet is a restless child, frustrated by the lengthy precision of early photography that one must endure to compose and take photographs.

Nell decides that Violet is old enough for her virginity to be auctioned off, and after a bidding war between regulars, Violet is bought by an apparently "quiet" customer. Hattie, meanwhile, wanting to escape her life of prostitution, marries a customer (Alfred Fuller) and leaves for St. Louis without Violet, whom her new husband believes to be her sister. Hattie promises to return for Violet once she has settled in and explained everything to her new spouse.

Violet flees the brothel after being punished for engaging in "hijinks" and getting into trouble. She appears on Bellocq's doorstep, asking if he will sleep with and take care of her. He initially refuses, but then takes her in, soon beginning a sexual relationship with the young girl. Later, Bellocq buys Violet a doll, saying that "every child should have a doll."; she responds by saying, "I'm a child to you?!". Violet is frustrated by Bellocq's devotion to his photography and lack of care for her as a dependent, as much as he is frustrated by her childlike behaviour. She later poses for a picture holding the doll and looking like a young girl. Later on, Violet sits under a tree, playing with her doll and recites her mother's criticisms of her to the doll.

Violet eventually returns to Nell's after quarrelling with Bellocq, but local social reform groups are forcing all brothels of Storyville to close. As everyone packs and leaves, Bellocq appears and proposes marriage to Violet. Excited, Violet tells some of the women, who then accompany them to church. After the wedding, they all go to the country to celebrate.

Two weeks after the wedding, Hattie and her new husband (Fuller) arrive from St. Louis to collect Violet, claiming that her marriage to Bellocq is illegal without parental consent. Bellocq does not want to let Violet go, but Fuller explains that Hattie has been "reformed" and Violet deserves the same opportunity. Violet asks if Bellocq will come with her and her family to St. Louis. Following a prolonged silence, Bellocq finally gestures for Violet to go with her family.

At the train station, Violet is dressed in adolescent clothes with a ribbon in her hair. Fuller has Violet pose with her mother and baby brother for a family photograph, but an upset Violet stares into the distance, almost into the camera/viewer.

== Cast ==
- Brooke Shields as Violet
- Keith Carradine as E. J. Bellocq
- Susan Sarandon as Hattie
- Frances Faye as Nell
- Antonio Fargas as The Professor
- Matthew Anton as "Red Top"
- Diana Scarwid as Frieda
- Barbara Steele as Josephine
- Seret Scott as Flora
- Don Hood as Alfred Fuller
- Cheryl Markowitz as Gussie
- Susan Manskey as Fanny
- Laura Zimmerman as Agnes
- Miz Mary as Odette
- Gerrit Graham as "Highpockets"
- Mae Mercer as Mama Mosebery

== Production ==
=== Development ===
Screenwriter Polly Platt developed the idea for the film after meeting with Louis Malle and learning of his love of New Orleans jazz music, which was an integral part of the Storyville red-light district in the city in the early 20th century. Platt based the screenplay on the life of a young girl who was forced into prostitution by her mother, which was recounted in historian Al Rose's 1974 book Storyville, New Orleans: Being an Authentic Illustrated Account of the Notorious Red-Light District, as well as the life of photographer Ernest Bellocq, who photographed various New Orleans prostitutes in the early 20th century.

=== Casting ===
Following her acclaimed performance as a child prostitute in Taxi Driver (1976), the studio was keen on casting Jodie Foster as Violet. However, Malle rejected the idea as he thought the role should be played by a 12-year-old only, and Foster was 14. Brooke Shields, a child model who had made her film debut the year before in Alice, Sweet Alice (1976), met with Malle and the film's screenwriter, Polly Platt. She described her audition as consisting merely of a conversation with the two, in which they largely asked her questions about her life. To ensure that Shields was intellectually able to navigate the material, Malle and Platt also inquired if she was aware of what prostitution was. Shields, who had grown up in New York City and observed working prostitutes in Times Square, had been informed by her mother what prostitution entailed.

Susan Sarandon, who was cast as Violet's mother, commented on Shields's casting in the role: "Brooke lived a life that was very similar [to that of her character] ... You know ... The closest thing to a child prostitute (sexually exploited child) would be a child actor-model, in this day and age. Brooke was already an incredibly mature kid and I don't think it's any secret that she was ... asked to grow up very quickly."

Platt initially planned for the role of E. J. Bellocq to go to Jack Nicholson, but Malle denounced this. Instead, he offered the role to Keith Carradine, which Carradine was confused by as he bore no physical similarities to Bellocq.

=== Filming ===
Pretty Baby was shot on location in New Orleans over a period of four months in 1977 with the wedding scene filmed outside of the city in Dew Drop Social and Benevolent Hall. Due to its controversial subject matter, the production stated they were "being very cautious because of the nature of the material and ... following all the rules aimed at safeguarding child performers: teachers, psychological testing, parental cooperation and so forth."

Screenwriter Polly Platt stated that Malle insisted on continuous rehearsals throughout the shoot, which frustrated much of the cast and crew. Platt described Shields's mother, Teri, as "obstreperous" on the set, and claimed she was arrested by police for driving while intoxicated with her daughter in the car, as well as for punching a police officer in the face.

Shields maintained in later years that she "did not experience any distress or humiliation" while filming her nude scenes in the film. What she does remember was trying not to look as if she had "just sucked on a lemon" before her on-screen kiss with then-28-year-old Keith Carradine, adding that the actor was "so kind". She also recounted being soundly slapped by Susan Sarandon.

Commenting on the production, Malle stated "Pretty Baby was harder than I expected, and in the meantime, I fell in love with America." After filming was completed, Malle chose to become a U.S. resident and stayed there for the remainder of his life.

== Music ==
ABC Records released a soundtrack of the film's ragtime score, which was nominated for an Academy Award for Best Adaptation Score.

== Release ==
=== Marketing ===
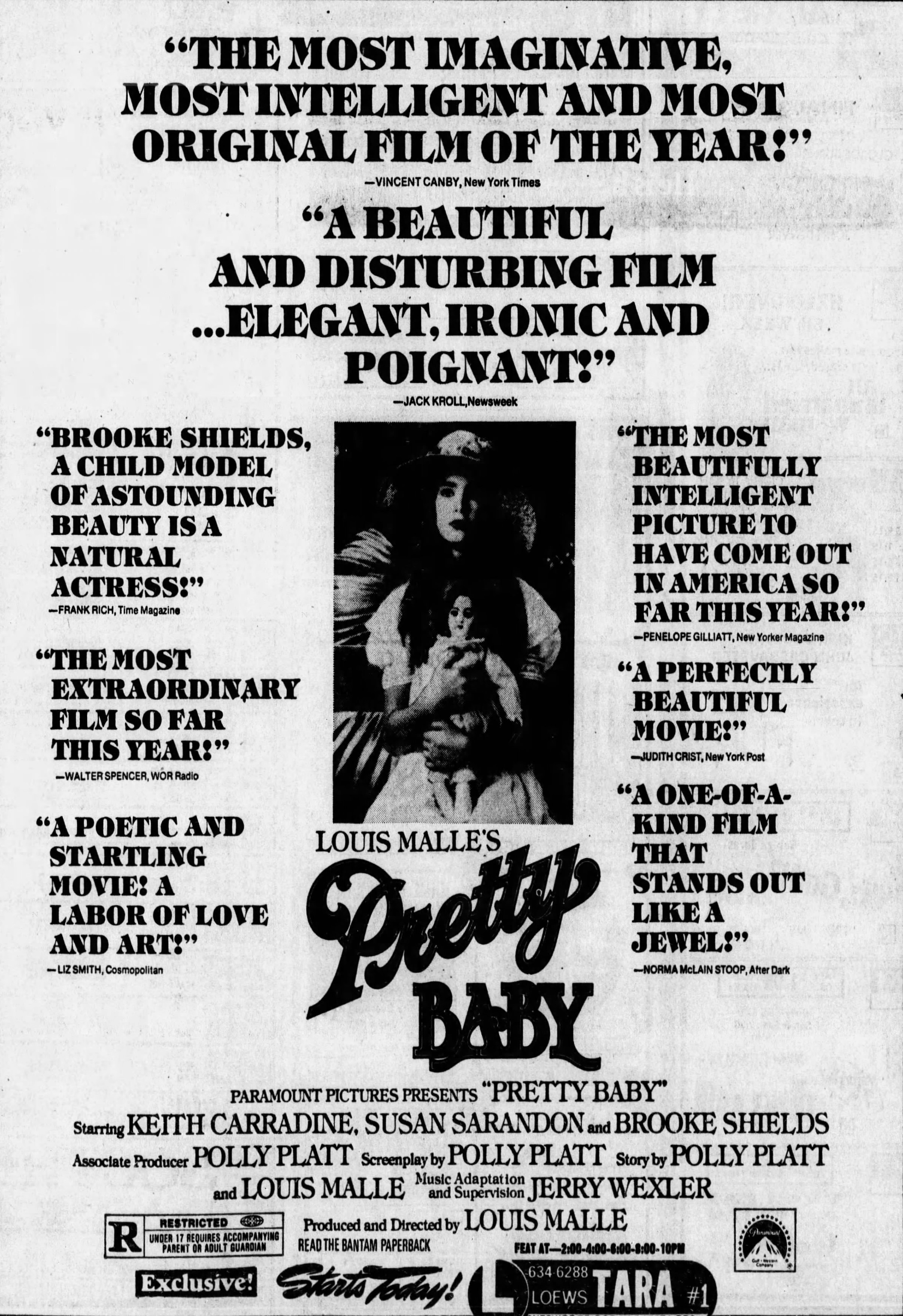
Theatrical advertisement, 1978

Despite Malle's concerted effort to make the film sanitized of explicit sex, it received significant salacious pre-publicity leading up to its release, including a lengthy article by Joan Goodman in New York Magazine, which described it as "Lolita, only in period costume and much more explicit." Further press attention came in the form of Shields's appearance in a pictorial about the film in Playboy in March 1978. Malle's brother, Vincent, commented that the film's pre-publicity was calculated by Malle and "absolutely deliberate. ... It was not something imposed on him by Paramount."

Film scholar and Malle biographer Nathan Southern wrote that Malle "realized that by leading viewers to expect "sophisticated kiddie porn," but carrying the film's content to the opposite extreme (inexplicitness), the contrast between audience expectations and onscreen reality – the power derived from the modernistic interplay of opposites within the framework of anticipation – would make the film's message of relativistic ethos that much clearer in the audience's mind."

According to critic Danny Peary, Pretty Baby was released during a period of the 1970s in which "peak public outrage over child abuse, child pornography, and child prostitution, and its critics were right to be disappointed that Malle refused to portray Violet's life in a brothel in a negative light ... The sledgehammer 'selling of Brooke Shields as a pubescent sex symbol,' which gained momentum because of the film, was truly tasteless. At least Malle didn't exploit his hot property as much as others did."

=== Controversy and censorship ===
The subject matter of the film, along with certain scenes resulted in the film being cut, edited or banned in various jurisdictions. The continuing controversy over Shields's underage nude scenes resulted in the film being banned in the Canadian provinces of Ontario and Saskatchewan (until 1995). Gossip columnist Rona Barrett called the film "child pornography", with director Malle being described as a "combination of Lolita's Humbert Humbert and the (by that point) controversial director Roman Polanski". In Argentina, the film, along with another of Paramount's releases of the time, Looking for Mr. Goodbar, was banned under the regime of Jorge Rafael Videla during that country's last civil/military dictatorship, due (in large part) to the "pornographic" content that was present in both films. For five years, the film was also banned by the apartheid regime in South Africa.

Sarandon reflected on the film's censorship in a later interview, commenting that the censors "were looking for something. The film was disturbing ... [yet] clearly when you look at it, it doesn't have anything graphic. Even at that time, it was pretty tame."

In addition to the issue of child prostitution, the scenes involving a nude, 12-year-old Shields were undoubtedly controversial.

The film received an R-rating in the United States, and an M in Australia, from the Australian Classification Board (ACB).

United Kingdom

When the film was submitted to the British Board of Film Classification (BBFC) for cinema release, it ran into legal issues. At the time the Protection of Children Bill, which went on to become the Protection of Children Act 1978, was going through Parliament.

The bill would go on to criminalise the manufacture and distribution of any 'indecent' images of individuals under the age of 16, in England and Wales.

Given the age of the actress involved, discussion therefore ensued between the head of the BBFC at the time, James Ferman and the films director:

”As you know, your film Pretty Baby is likely to run into some difficulties in Britain if and when the Protection of Children Bill is enacted into law. The Bill passed through the Commons last week and is expected to have a fairly easy passage in the Lords, in which case it should receive the Royal Assent some time during July [...] There is no doubt that this Bill will apply to any film which purports to show children under the age of consent engaged in scenes which may be found to be indecent.“

Ferman went on to comment on the screening that had taken place with Home Office officials and representatives of the DPP, who while acknowledging the merits of the film, expressed a view that the film could fall afoul of the bill (if passed), further internal discussion would be and prior to the passage of the bill, and the film was eventually seen after it became law, resulting in two cuts to indecent images being made in July 1978. These proposed cuts were put to the film's director, Louis Malle, who was very reluctant to make any changes to his film, although ultimately agreed to the changes made to the film. The film was passed X and released in 1978.

The uncut version was released on DVD in 2006. This same uncut print is the basis of the Region 1 and Region 2 DVD editions worldwide.

=== Home media ===
Paramount Home Entertainment released the film on DVD on November 18, 2003. In 2022, the Australian film label Imprint Films released it for the first time on Blu-ray in a special edition, which included an interview with Shields, in which she recalled shooting the film as well as its controversial reception. Kino Lorber announced in January 2023 the forthcoming release of a North American Blu-ray.

== Reception ==
=== Box office ===
The movie was met with a lackluster response from moviegoers. It performed poorly in terms of box office revenue, failing to even make it into the top 50 highest-grossing films of both 1978 and 1979. By December 31, 1978, it only generated $4.13 million in theatrical rentals. Despite its $3 million budget, the film was unable to generate enough ticket sales to cover its production costs.

=== Critical response ===
Pretty Baby divided critics at the time of its release. In his review for The New York Times, Vincent Canby wrote: "Mr. Malle, the French director ... has made some controversial films in his time but none, I suspect, that is likely to upset convention quite as much as this one – and mostly for the wrong reasons. Though the setting is a whorehouse, and the lens through which we see everything is Violet, who ... herself becomes one of Nell's chief attractions, Pretty Baby is neither about child prostitution nor is it pornographic." Canby ended his review with the claim that Pretty Baby is "... the most imaginative, most intelligent, and most original film of the year to date." Film critic Kenneth Turan praised Shields's performance as "chilling," but felt the film largely boasts a "flat, uninvolving directorial style ... Like its protagonist, Pretty Baby is something of a carnival attraction, nothing more."

Chicago Sun-Times critic Roger Ebert, who gave the film three stars out of four, discussed how "... Pretty Baby has been attacked in some quarters as child porn. It's not. It's an evocation of a time and a place and a sad chapter of Americana." He also praised Shields' performance, writing that she "... really creates a character here; her subtlety and depth are astonishing."

On the other hand, Variety wrote that "the film is handsome, the players nearly all effective, but the story highlights are confined within a narrow range of ho-hum dramatization." Mountain Xpress critic Ken Hanke, looking at the film from the perspective of 2003, said of Pretty Baby: "It was once shocking and dull. Now it's just dull."

Pauline Kael for The New Yorker called the film "hollowly objective" and "made acceptable by reviewers' assurances that the forbidden subject is handled with good taste."

As of March 2023, review aggregator Rotten Tomatoes reports that 71% of 28 critics had given the film a favorable review, with a weighted average of 6.88/10. Metacritic, which uses a weighted average, assigned the film a score of 66 out of 100, based on 10 critics, indicating "generally favorable" reviews.

=== Accolades ===
The film won the Technical Grand Prize at the 1978 Cannes Film Festival, and was nominated for the Palme d'Or. The film's original musical score by Ferdinand Morton earned the film an Academy Award nomination for Best Music.

== Controversies and cultural impacts ==
While majoring in French literature at Princeton University, Shields went on to write her senior thesis, The Initiation: From Innocence to Experience: The Pre-Adolescent/Adolescent Journey in the Films of Louis Malle, Pretty Baby and Lacombe, Lucien (1987), comparing the themes of lost innocence in both films, as well as its role as a predominant theme across the director's filmography. A documentary titled Pretty Baby: Brooke Shields, which charts the actress's career and partly focuses on the film's impact on her, premiered at the Sundance Film Festival in January 2023, ahead of a streaming release via Hulu in April 2023.

In 2003, The New York Times placed Pretty Baby on its list of the Best 1,000 Movies Ever.
