= Basin Street =

Street in New Orleans, Louisiana

Coordinates: 29°57′25.13″N 90°04′20.56″W

Basin Street or Rue Bassin in French, is a street in New Orleans, Louisiana. It parallels Rampart Street one block lakeside, or inland, from the boundary of the French Quarter, running from Canal Street down 5 blocks past Saint Louis Cemetery. It currently then turns lakewards, flowing into Orleans Avenue.

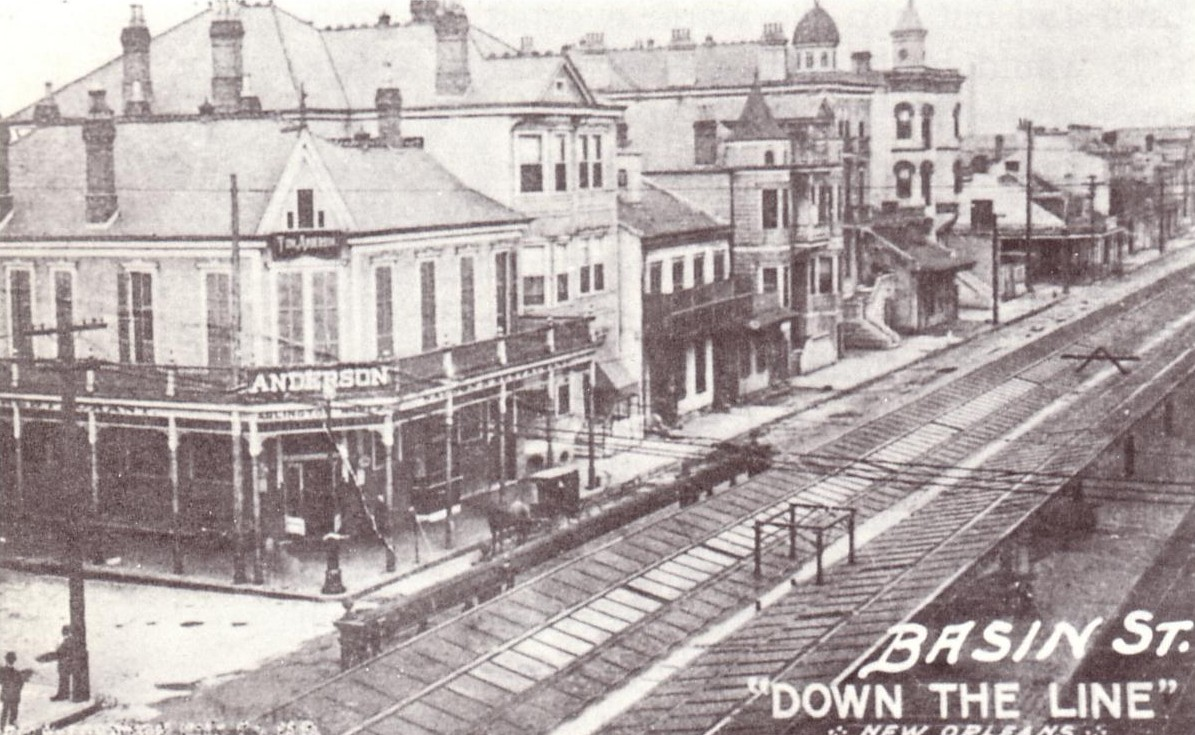
Basin Street, circa 1909.

The name comes from the turning basin of the Carondelet Canal formerly located on the street, where it now turns on to Orleans by the Municipal Auditorium.

In the late 19th century and early 20th century railroad tracks paralleled the Canal and then turned on to Basin Street, running up the "neutral ground" (as street medians are called locally) to one of the city's main railroad depots on Canal Street.

At one time one of the finest residential streets in the city, it became a red light district around 1870. From 1897 through World War I, the back side of Basin Street was the front of the Storyville red light district, with a line of high end saloons and mansions devoted to music.

After Storyville's closure, Basin Street was temporarily renamed North Saratoga. The majority of Storyville was demolished and replaced with the Iberville Projects.

Basin Street formerly continued on the other side of Canal Street to Common Street, today known as Elk Place, which after two blocks becomes Loyola Avenue on the upper side of Common Street. The equivalent street paralleling Rampart one block back on the other side of Louis Armstrong Park in the Treme neighborhood is Saint Claude.

There is a series of monuments on the neutral ground of Basin Street, including statues of Simón Bolívar, Benito Juárez, and Francisco Morazán, and a metal sign commemorating Storyville.

== In popular music ==
Basin Street was commemorated in the song "Basin Street Blues" published by Spencer Williams in 1926. There have been many recordings of this jazz standard including:

- Recordings by Louis Armstrong (both in 1928, as a solo artist and along with His Hot Five in 1938, vocal, #20)
- The Charleston Chasers (under the direction of Benny Goodman, 1931, Jack Teagarden, vocal, #14)
- Benny Goodman and His Orchestra (1934, #14)
- Bing Crosby and Connee Boswell (1937, vocal, #12)
- Ella Fitzgerald as a solo artist along Sly Oliver & His Orchestra (1947, #16)
- Miles Davis in 1963

Basin Street is also mentioned in the song “Christmas in New Orleans” by Louis Armstrong.

== See also ==
- List of streets of New Orleans
