= Mason (surname) =

Mason is an occupational surname of Scottish and English origin, with variations also found in Italian and French, historically referring to someone who performed stonemasonry work. The surname Mason was originally brought to England in the great wave of migration following the Norman Conquest of 1066. The name Mason is for a stone-mason. The name was originally derived from the Old English or Old French word masson.

== Scotland ==
In Scotland, the surname Mason is most notably linked to the old French family name Saint-Clair. This developed into the Scottish Clan name Sinclair. From Sinclair, the family name diverged onto many Clan Septs including Mason, Masson, Lyall, Purdy, Snoddy and Clyne.

== England ==
Following the Norman Conquest in 1066, the surname Mason was found in various counties and shires throughout England but one of the oldest was found in Kent on the Isle of Thanet. One of the earliest records on the name was found in London c. 1130 when John Macun was listed there at that time.

== Italy ==
In Italy The surname Mason was first found in Piedmont (Italian: Piemonte, Piedmontese and Occitan: Piemont) in the 13th century. Early records show the Masini family, decedents of a long line of counts, lived there. Members included Oddone, elected captain of the commune in 1284, and Oddonnino, governor of a town, Vercelli, in 1290.

Enormous variation of the Italian surname occurred in the medieval era. The modern day variations of Mason include Masella, Maselli, Masellis, Masetti, Masetto, Masi, Masiello, Masillo, Masin, Masina, Masini, Masino, Masiol, Maso, Masolini, Masolo, Mason, Masoni, Masotti, Masselli, Massetti, Massini, Masucci, Masuccio, Masulli, Masullo, Masutti, Masutto and many more.

== France ==
The name Mason originated as an occupational surname (from the French word maçon, meaning "stoneworker" or "builder"). The name came from the French family name Saint-Clair. The Saint-clair name has notable links to the Norman Conquest of 1066 and William the Conqueror.

== People with the surname include ==
=== A ===
- Aaron Mason (born 1979), British racing driver
- Abbie K. Mason (1861–1908), American suffragist
- Abdullah Mason (born 2004), American boxer
- Abigail Mason (born 1989), American actress
- Adrian Mason, Welsh politician
- A. E. W. Mason (1865–1948), English author
- Agnes Mason (1849–1941), British nun
- Alan Mason (1934–2014), Australian rugby league footballer
- Albert Mason (disambiguation), multiple people
- Alden Mason (artist) (1919–2013), American painter
- Alexander Macomb Mason (1841–1897), American naval officer
- Alfred Mason (1837–1895), Australian priest
- Alice Mason (disambiguation), multiple people
- Allan Mason, American record producer
- Allan Mason (cricketer) (1921–2006), English cricketer
- Alpheus T. Mason (1899–1989), American legal scholar
- Alton Mason (born 1997), American model
- Ambrose Mason (born 1951), Welsh priest
- Amelia Gere Mason (1831–1923), American writer
- Amy Mason (born 1982), British comedian
- Angela Mason (born 1944), British activist
- Andrea Mason (disambiguation), multiple people
- Andrew Mason (disambiguation), multiple people
- Andy Mason (born 1974), English footballer
- Anthony Mason (disambiguation), multiple people
- Antoine Mason (born 1992), American basketball player
- Appleton A. Mason (1880–1938), American football player
- Armistead Thomson Mason (1787–1819), American politician
- Arnold Henry Mason (1885–1963), British painter
- Arthur Mason (disambiguation), multiple people

=== B ===
- Babbie Mason (born 1955), American singer
- Barbara Mason (born 1947), American singer
- Barry Mason (disambiguation), multiple people
- Bashir Mason (born 1984), American basketball coach
- Basil Mason, British screenwriter
- Belinda Mason (1958–1991), American activist
- Ben Mason (disambiguation), multiple people
- Benjamin Mason (disambiguation), multiple people
- Benedict Mason (born 1954), British composer
- Bertha Mason (disambiguation), multiple people
- Beth Mason (born 1960), American politician
- Bev Mason (born 1960), English Anglican bishop
- Biddy Mason (1818–1891), American slave
- Bill Mason (disambiguation), multiple people
- Billy Mason (disambiguation), multiple people
- Bob Mason (ice hockey) (born 1961), American ice hockey player
- Bobbie Ann Mason (born 1940), American novelist
- Bobby Mason (born 1936), English footballer
- Bobby Joe Mason (1936–2006), American basketball player
- Brandon Mason (born 1997), English footballer
- Brandon Scott Mason (born 1986), American football player
- Brent Mason (born 1959), American guitarist
- Brett Mason (born 1962), Australian politician
- Brewster Mason (1922–1987), British actor
- Brian Mason (disambiguation), multiple people
- Brittany Mason (born 1986), American model
- Brittni Mason (born 1998), American Paralympic sprinter
- Bruce Mason (1921–1982), New Zealand playwright
- Bruce Mason (sports scientist) (born 1945), Australian sports scientist

=== C ===
- Cameron Mason (born 2000), British cyclist
- Carl Mason (born 1953), English golfer
- Carlos H. Mason (1873–1955), American businessman
- Carol Mason, American biologist
- Caroline Mason (disambiguation), multiple people
- Catherine Mason, Australian-British art historian
- Cathy Mason, Northern Irish politician
- C. Avery Mason (1904–1970), American bishop
- Charles Mason (disambiguation), multiple people
- Charlotte Mason (disambiguation), multiple people
- Charmaine Mason (born 1970), Australian cricketer
- Chase Mason (born 2002), American football player
- Cheryl L. Mason, American attorney
- Chester Mason (born 1981), American basketball player
- Chris Mason (disambiguation), multiple people
- Christopher E. Mason, American professor
- Clarence Mason (born 1965), American lawyer
- Claudia Mason (born 1973), American actress
- Clive Mason (born 1954), Scottish television presenter
- C. Nicole Mason (born 1976), American author
- Colin Mason (1926–2020), Australian author
- Concetta Mason (born 1952), American glass artist
- Connie Mason (born 1937), American model
- Conor Mason (born 1992), Northern Irish singer
- Cory Mason (born 1973), American politician
- C. Post Mason (??–1918), American film director
- Crystal Mason, American social figure
- C. T. Mason Jr. (1918–2012), American professor
- C. Vernon Mason (born 1946/1947), American lawyer
- Cynthia G. Mason, American songwriter

=== D ===
- Dale Mason (born 1974), Barbadian cricketer
- Damon Mason (born 1974), American football player
- Dan Mason (1857–1929), American actor
- Daniel Mason (born 1976), American novelist and physician
- Danika Mason (born 1991), Australian journalist
- Danny Mason (born 1990), American football player
- Dave Mason (1946–2026), English singer-songwriter
- Davey Mason (born 1998), American soccer player
- David Mason (disambiguation), multiple people
- Davie Mason (born 1984), Canadian football player
- Dawn Mason (born 1945), American politician
- Dean Mason (disambiguation), multiple people
- Debbie Mason (born 1952), American basketball player
- Debra Mason (born 1968), British runner
- Del Mason (1883–1962), American baseball player
- Derek Mason (born 1969), American football coach
- Derrick Mason (born 1974), American football player
- Desmond Mason (born 1977), American basketball player
- Diana Mason (disambiguation), multiple people
- Dick Mason (1881–1936), New Zealand cricketer
- Don Mason (disambiguation), multiple people
- Doug Mason (born 1955), Canadian-Dutch ice hockey coach
- Douglas Mason (1941–2004), Scottish politician
- Dray Mason (born 1985), American football player
- Dudley Mason (1901–1987), British army officer
- Dutch Mason (1938–2006), Canadian musician

=== E ===
- Ebenezer E. Mason (1829–1910), American farmer
- Ed Mason (1946–2021), Canadian newscaster
- Eddie Mason (born 1972), American football player
- Edgar Mason (disambiguation), multiple people
- Edith Mason (1892–1973), American singer
- Edmund William Mason (1890–1975), English mycologist
- Edward Mason (disambiguation), multiple people
- Edwyn E. Mason (1913–2003), American politician
- Eldon Mason (1902–1990), American football coach
- Eliana Mason (born 1995), American goalball player
- Elisabeth Mason, American lawyer
- Elizabeth Mason (disambiguation), multiple people
- Ellen Mason (disambiguation), multiple people
- Elliot Mason (born 1977), English musician
- Elliott Mason (1888–1949), British actress
- Elmer Brown Mason (1877–1955), American writer
- Emily Mason (disambiguation), multiple people
- Emma Mason (born 1986), Scottish badminton player
- Ernest Mason (1913–1942), British pilot
- Ernie Mason (1870–1904), American baseball player
- Euan Mason (born 1953), New Zealand professor
- Eudo Mason (1901–1969), German scholar
- Eveleen Laura Mason (1838–1914), American writer

=== F ===
- Felicia Mason (born 1962), American author
- Frances Mason, British musician
- Francis Mason (disambiguation), multiple people
- Frank Mason (disambiguation), multiple people
- Fanny Peabody Mason (1864–1948), American heiress, philanthropist
- Fred Mason (1901–1930), English footballer
- Frederick Mason (disambiguation), multiple people
- F. Van Wyck Mason (1901–1978), American historian and novelist

=== G ===
- Garrett Mason (born 1985), American politician
- Gary Mason (disambiguation), multiple people
- Gerald Mason (1934–2017), American criminal
- Gerald Mason (lacrosse) (1877–1951), British lacrosse player
- Germaine Mason (1983–2017), Jamaican athlete
- Geoff Mason (1930–2018), Australian rules footballer
- Geoffrey Mason (1902–1987), American bobsledder
- Geoffrey Mason (producer) (1940–2026), American television producer
- George Mason (disambiguation), multiple people
- Georgia Mason (1910–2007), American botanist
- Ginna Claire Mason, American actress
- Gilbert R. Mason (1928–2006), American physician
- Gina Mason (1959–2017), American politician
- Glen Mason (born 1950), American football coach
- Glen Mason (singer) (1930–2014), Scottish singer
- Glyn Mason, 2nd Baron Blackford (1887–1972), British politician
- Gordon Mason (1921–2010), New Zealand politician
- Grace-Evangeline Mason (born 1994), British composer
- Grant Mason (born 1983), American football player
- Guillermo Suárez Mason (1924–2005), Argentine military officer
- Gwendolen Mason (1883–1977), Welsh musician

=== H ===
- Haddon Mason (1898–1966), British actor
- Harold Mason (disambiguation), multiple people
- Harriet Mason (1845–1932), American illustrator
- Harry Mason (disambiguation), multiple people
- Harvey Mason (born 1947), American drummer
- Harvey Mason Jr. (born 1968), American record producer
- Heath Mason (born 2005), Australian rugby league footballer
- Helen Mason (disambiguation), multiple people
- Henry Mason (disambiguation), multiple people
- Herbert Mason (1891–1960), British movie director
- Herbert Louis Mason (1896–1994), American botanist
- Hilary Mason (1917–2006), English actress
- Hilary Mason (entrepreneur), American entrepreneur
- Hilda Mason (1916–2007), American politician
- Hilda Mason (architect) (1879–1955), English architect
- Horrie Mason (1903–1975), Australian rules footballer
- Howard Mason (born 1958), American criminal
- Hugh Mason (1817–1886), English social reformer
- Hugh Mason (rower) (1915–2010), English rower
- Hutson Mason (born 1991), American football player

=== I ===
- Ian Mason (disambiguation), multiple people
- Ingrid Mason (born 1952), Australian actress
- Isaac Mason (1822–1898), American author and activist

=== J ===
- Jack Mason (1874–1958), English cricketer
- Jack Mason (RAF airman) (1896–1968), British pilot
- Jackie Mason (1928–2021), American comedian
- Jacob Mason (born 2000), Canadian football player
- Jacqueline Mason (1935–2020), Australian skier
- Jah Mason (born 1970), Jamaican musician
- Jake Mason (born 1977), Australian musician
- Jamele Mason (born 1989), Puerto Rican hurdler
- James Mason (disambiguation), multiple people
- Jamie Mason, American author
- Jane Kendall Mason (1909–1981), American socialite
- Janette Mason (born 1963), British pianist
- Janice Mason (born 1959), Canadian rower
- Janie Mason (born 1941), Australian nurse
- J. Barry Mason (born 1941), American academic
- Jeanine Mason (born 1991), American actress and dancer
- Jeff Mason (born 1981), American ice hockey player
- Jem Mason (1816–1866), English jockey
- Jennifer Mason (sociologist) (born 1958), British sociologist
- Jeremiah Mason (1768–1848), American politician
- Jerry Mason (disambiguation), multiple people
- Jesse Mason (born 1984), Canadian racing driver
- Jim Mason (disambiguation), multiple people
- Jimilu Mason (1930–2019), American sculptor
- J. Kenyon Mason (1919–2017), English professor
- John Mason (disambiguation), multiple people
- Jonathan Mason (disambiguation), multiple people
- Jordan Mason (born 1999), American football player
- Joseph Mason (disambiguation), multiple people
- Josh Mason (born 2002), British racing driver
- Josiah Mason (1795–1881), British pen manufacturer
- Joyce Mason (born 1969), American politician
- J. S. Mason (1839–1918), American politician
- Judi Ann Mason (1955–2009), American television writer
- Julian S. Mason (1876–1954), American newspaper editor
- Julie Mason (born 1966), American journalist
- Justin Mason, Irish software developer

=== K ===
- Karen Mason (born 1951), American actress
- Karen Oppenheim Mason (1942–2024), American sociologist
- Karol Mason (born 1957), American attorney
- Kate Mason (born 1987), British journalist
- Keith Mason (disambiguation), multiple people
- Kenneth Mason (disambiguation), multiple people
- Keno Mason (born 1972), Trinidadian cricketer
- Kevin Mason (born 1972), American football player
- Kierron Mason (born 1998), Trinidadian footballer
- Kimberly Mason (born 1989), Australian rhythmic gymnast

=== L ===
- Lance Mason (born 1967), American criminal
- Lance Mason (American football) (born 2003), American football player
- Lancelot Mason (1905–1990), English priest
- Larry Mason (disambiguation), multiple people
- La Toya Mason (born 1984), English rugby union footballer
- Laura Mason (1957–2021), British food historian
- Laurence Mason (born 1969/1970), American actor
- Lawrence Mason (1892–1972), American football coach
- Lee Mason (born 1971), English football referee
- Lee Mason (actor), Australian actor
- Len Mason (1903–1953), New Zealand rugby player
- Lena Doolin Mason (1864–1924), American preacher
- Leon Mason (born 2007), Gibraltarian footballer
- Leonard Mason (disambiguation), multiple people
- Les Mason (1954–2024), American politician
- Leslie Mason (born 1934), Canadian boxer
- Lisa Mason (born 1982), British gymnast
- Lisa Mason (writer) (1953–2023), American writer
- Lowell Mason (1792–1872), American composer
- Lowell B. Mason (1893–1983), American politician
- Luba Mason (born 1961), American actress
- Lucy Mason, American politician
- Lucy Randolph Mason (1882–1959), American activist
- Lukas Mason (born 2005), English rugby league footballer
- Lynn Mason (born 1942), Canadian military officer

=== M ===
- Mack Mason (born 1996), Australian rugby union footballer
- Madelon Mason (1921–2011), American model
- Maggie Mason (born 1975), American author
- Makai Mason (born 1995), German-American basketball player
- Marcel Mason (born 1959), Canadian blogger
- Marco Mason (born 1992), South African rugby union footballer
- Marcus Mason (born 1984), American football player
- Margaret Mason (1940–1999), American actress
- Margery Mason (1913–2014), English actress and director
- Margie Mason, American journalist
- Marilyn Mason (1925–2019), American musician
- Marius Mason (born 1962), American environmental activist
- Mark Mason (disambiguation), multiple people
- Martha Mason (1937–2009), American writer
- Martin Mason (disambiguation), multiple people
- Marsha Mason (born 1942), American actress
- Mary Mason (born 1954), British singer
- Mary Cranston Mason (1846–1932), Scottish social reformer
- Marylou Olivarez Mason (1936–2019), American civil servant
- Matthew Mason (disambiguation), multiple people
- Maurice Mason (1927–2009), English footballer
- Maurice Mason (hurler) (born 1948), Irish hurler
- Max Mason (1877–1961), American mathematician
- Meg Mason, Australian author
- Mel Mason, English rugby league footballer
- Melvin T. Mason (born 1943), American politician
- Mercedes Mason (born 1982), Swedish-American actress
- Michael Mason (disambiguation), multiple people
- Michelle Mason, American philosopher
- Mila Mason (born 1963), American musician
- Miriam E. Mason (1900–1973), American writer
- M. L. Mason (1906–1990), American judge
- Molly Mason, American musician
- Monica Mason (born 1941), British ballet dancer
- Monty Mason (born 1967), American politician
- Morgan Mason (born 1955), American politician
- Moses Mason Jr. (1789–1866), American politician
- Mungo Mason (born 1995), Scottish rugby union footballer
- Myloh Jaqory Mason (born 1990), American criminal

=== N ===
- Nan Mason (1896–1982), American photographer
- Nate Mason (born 1995), American basketball player
- Nathan Mason (born 1993), English rugby league footballer
- Neil Mason (born 1977), American volleyball coach
- Neville Mason (born 1956), Barbadian cricketer
- Newton Mason (disambiguation), multiple people
- Niall Mason (born 1997), English footballer
- Nick Mason (born 1944), British drummer
- Nicky Mason (born 1965), English table tennis player
- Nigel Mason, English physicist
- Noah M. Mason (1882–1965), American politician
- Norm Mason (1914–1996), Australian rules footballer
- Norman Mason (disambiguation), multiple people

=== O ===
- Oliver Mason (born 1979), British actor
- Ora Kress Mason (1888–1970), American physician
- Oscar Mason (cyclist) (born 1975), Italian cyclist
- Oscar G. Mason (1830–1921), American photographer
- Otis Tufton Mason (1838–1908), American anthropologist

=== P ===
- Pablo Mason (born 1951), British air force officer
- Pat Mason, American baseball coach
- Patrick Mason (disambiguation), multiple people
- Paul Mason (disambiguation), multiple people
- Percy Mason (1873–1952), English cricketer
- Peter Mason (disambiguation), multiple people
- Philip Mason (1906–1999), British civil servant
- Philip P. Mason (1928–2021), American archivist
- Portland Mason (1948–2004), British actress
- Primus P. Mason (1817–1892), American entrepreneur

=== R ===
- Rachel Mason (born 1978), American filmmaker
- R. A. K. Mason (1905–1971), New Zealand poet
- Ralph Mason (1938–2016), English singer
- Ralph L. Mason (1896–1977), American politician
- Raymond Mason (disambiguation), multiple people
- Rena Mason, American author
- Revil Mason (1929–2020), South African archaeologist
- Rex Mason (1885–1975), New Zealand politician
- Richard Mason (disambiguation), multiple people
- Rick Mason, American politician
- Rob Mason (born 1976), American politician
- Robert Mason (disambiguation), multiple people
- Robin Mason (born 1958), British painter
- Rod Mason (musician) (1940–2017), English musician
- Roger Mason (disambiguation), multiple people
- Ron Mason (1940–2016), Canadian ice hockey coach
- Ron G. Mason (1916–2005), British oceanographer
- Ronald Mason (disambiguation), multiple people
- Rosalee Mason (born 1979), English basketball player
- Roswell B. Mason (1805–1892), American politician
- Roy Mason (1924–2015), British politician
- Roy Mason (architect) (1938–1996), American architect
- Rufus Osgood Mason (1830–1903), American physician
- Ruth Mason (1913–1990), New Zealand botanist
- Ruth Mason (baseball), Canadian baseball player
- Ryan Mason (born 1991), English footballer and manager

=== S ===
- Sally Mason (born 1950), American academic administrator
- Sam Mason (born 1968), British television presenter
- Sam Mason (American football) (1899–1971), American football player
- Samuel Mason (1739–1803), American military officer
- Samuel J. Mason (1921–1974), American electrical engineer
- Sandra Mason (born 1949), Barbadian politician
- Sandy Mason (1939–2015), American singer-songwriter
- Sarah Mason (disambiguation), multiple people
- Scott Mason (disambiguation), multiple people
- Sean Mason (born 1998), American musician
- Shaq Mason (born 1993), American football player
- Shirley Mason (disambiguation), multiple people
- Sidney Mason (1886–1923), American actor
- Sidney Redding Mason (1925–2009), American businessman and politician
- Silas Mason (wrestler) (born 1991), American professional wrestler
- Silas B. Mason (1879–1936), American businessman
- Simon Mason (disambiguation), multiple people
- Stella Mason (1901–1918), American native freedman
- Stephanie Lynne Mason (born 1984), American actress
- Stephen Mason (disambiguation), multiple people
- Steve Mason (disambiguation), multiple people
- Stevens T. Mason (1811–1843), American politician
- Stevens Thomson Mason (senator) (1760–1803), American lawyer and politician
- Stokely Mason (born 1975), Trinidadian footballer
- Stuart Mason (1948–2006), English footballer
- Sue Mason, British illustrator

=== T ===
- Taylor Mason (born 1956), American comedian
- Taylor Joy Mason, American television editor
- Te Haumihiata Mason, New Zealand linguist
- Terry Mason (born 1943), Australian Paralympic weightlifter
- Theodorus B. M. Mason (1848–1899), American naval intelligence officer
- Thomas Mason (disambiguation), multiple people
- Thomson Mason (disambiguation), multiple people
- Tim Mason (disambiguation), multiple people
- Timothy Mason (historian) (1940–1990), British historian
- Tommy Mason (1939–2015), American football player
- Tony Mason (disambiguation), multiple people
- Tre Mason (born 1993), American football player
- Tyler Mason (born 1995), Jamaican sprinter

=== V ===
- Venola Mason (born 1979/1980), American politician
- Verne Mason (1889–1965), American physician
- Vincent Mason (disambiguation), multiple people
- Vivian Mason (1918–2009), American actress

=== W ===
- Walt Mason (1862–1939), Canadian-American journalist
- Walter Mason (1847–1924), New Zealand cricketer
- Walter S. Mason Jr. (1920–2007), American veterinarian
- Warren P. Mason (1900–1986), American engineer and scientist
- Waye Mason (born 1972), Canadian politician
- Wayne Mason (born 1949), American musician
- Wells Mason (born 1968), American designer and sculptor
- Wes Mason (cyclist) (born 1941), English cyclist
- Wiley Roy Mason (1878–1967), American bishop
- William Mason (disambiguation), multiple people
- Willie Mason (born 1980), Australian rugby league footballer
- Willy Mason (born 1984), American singer-songwriter

=== Z ===
- Z. Mason (born 1991), American basketball player
- Zachary Mason (born 1974), American computer scientist

== Fictional characters and toys ==
- Daisy Mason, in the television series Downton Abbey
- Heather Mason, in the video game series Silent Hill
- Major Matt Mason, a Mattel action figure
- Maudie Mason, in the novel series "Maudie Stories"
- Moose Mason, in the comic universe Archie Comics
- Perry Mason, a lawyer in novels, short stories, film, radio and television
- Johanna Mason, a victor in the book and film series The Hunger Games

== See also ==
- Mason (disambiguation)
- Mason (given name)
- Admiral Mason (disambiguation)
- Attorney General Mason (disambiguation)
- General Mason (disambiguation)
- Justice Mason (disambiguation)
- President Mason (disambiguation)
- Senator Mason (disambiguation)
