= Robert Mason =

Robert Mason may refer to:

== Politics ==
- Robert Tufton Mason (1635–1688), English proprietor
- Robert Mason (died by 1581), MP for Ludlow
- Robert Mason (died 1591), MP for Ludlow
- Robert Mason (died 1635) (1579–1635), Member of Parliament for Winchester, 1628, and Christchurch, 1626
- Robert Mason (died c. 1669) (c. 1626–c. 1669), Member of Parliament for Winchester, 1666–1669
- Robert Mason (Liberal politician) (1857–1927), Member of Parliament for Wansbeck 1918–1922
- Robert Lindsay Mason (1942–2006), Ulster loyalist politician
- Robert Mercer Mason, Canadian politician

== Sports ==
- Robert Mason (cricketer) (born 1983), English cricketer
- Robert L. Mason (1948–2000), American wrestling coach
- Bob Mason (ice hockey) (born 1961), American ice hockey goaltender
- Bobby Mason (born 1936), English footballer of the 1950s-1960s
- Bobby Joe Mason (1936–2006), American basketball player

== Others ==
- Robert Mason (writer) (born 1942), American writer
- Robert Wesley Mason, American actor and singer
- Robert Mason Pollock (1917–2016), screenwriter/producer
- Bob Mason (actor) (1952–2004), British actor
- Robert Mason, lead singer for the bands Lynch Mob and Warrant

== See also ==
- Bob Maesen (born 1976), Belgian canoe sprinter
