= USS Mason =

USS Mason has been the name of more than one United States Navy ship, and may refer to:

- USS Mason (DD-191), a destroyer in commission from 1920 to 1922 and from 1939 to 1940
- USS Mason (DE-529), a destroyer escort in commission from 1944 to 1945
- USS Mason (DDG-87), a destroyer in commission since 2003

== See also ==
- USS Charlie B. Mason (SP-1225)
- USS Leonard F. Mason (DD-852)
