= 2013 United States Senate special election in New Jersey =

- October 16, 2013
- Turnout: 24.5% (▼48.5pp)
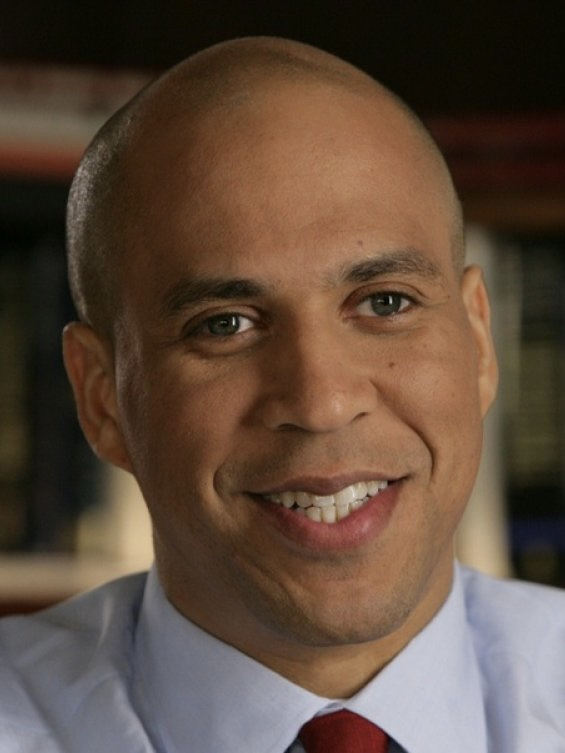

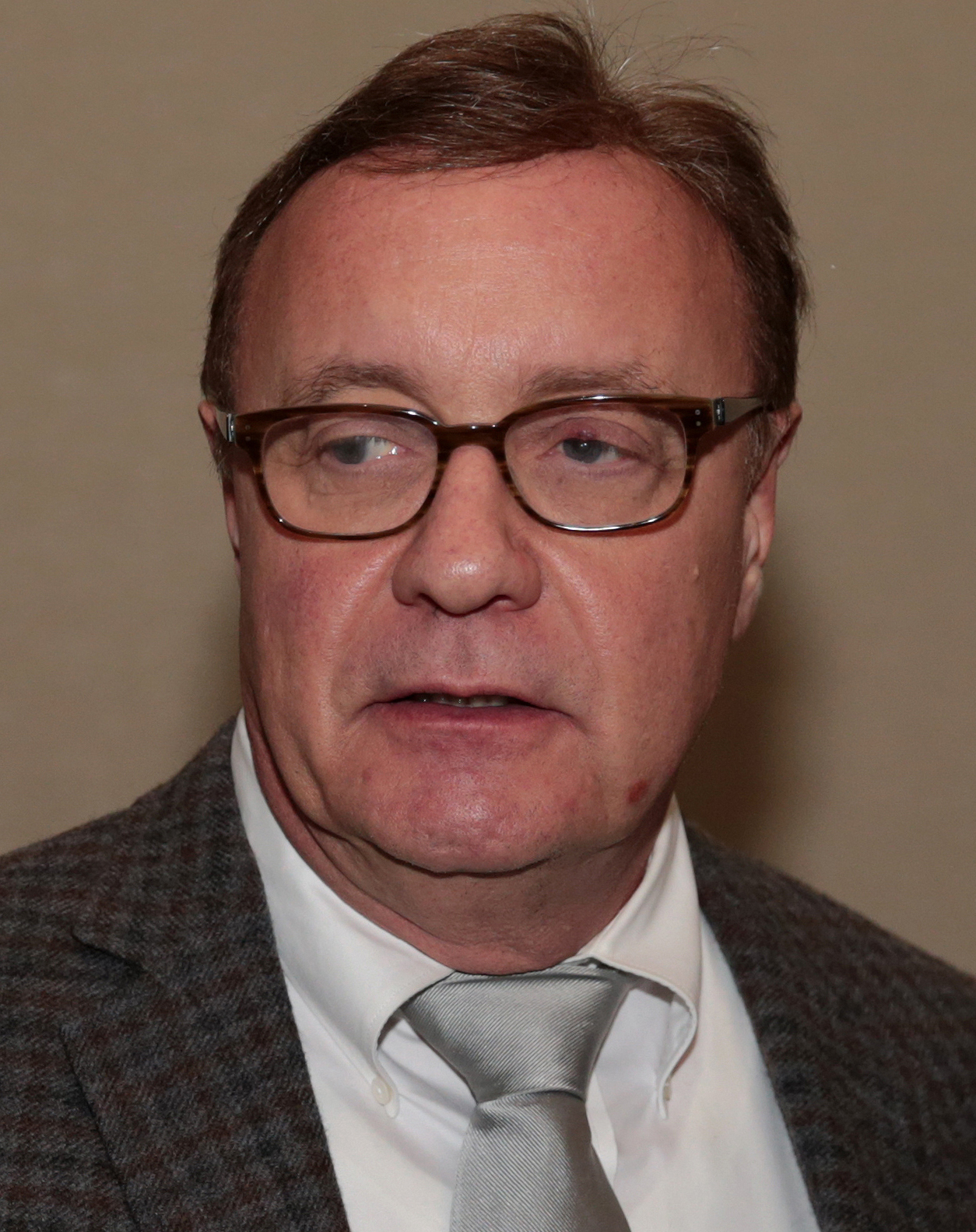
| Nominee | Cory Booker | Steve Lonegan |
| Party | Democratic | Republican |
| Popular vote | 740,742 | 593,684 |
| Percentage | 54.92% | 44.02% |
- Booker: 40–50% 50–60% 60–70% 70–80% 80–90% >90% Lonegan: 40–50% 50–60% 60–70% 70–80% 80–90% Tie: 40–50%
U.S. senator before election
Jeffrey Chiesa (Note: In June 2013, Chiesa was appointed by Governor Chris Christie to fill the vacancy caused by the death of Senator Frank Lautenberg.)
Republican
Elected U.S. Senator
Cory Booker
Democratic

The 2013 United States Senate special election in New Jersey was held on October 16, 2013, to fill the New Jersey United States Senate Class 2 seat for the remainder of the term ending January 3, 2015. The vacancy resulted from the death of 5-term Democratic senator Frank Lautenberg on June 3, 2013. On June 4, 2013, New Jersey Governor Chris Christie announced that a primary election to fill the vacancy would take place on August 13, 2013, and that a special election would follow on October 16, 2013. Christie appointed Republican New Jersey Attorney General Jeffrey Chiesa to the seat as a placeholder; Chiesa announced at the time of his appointment that he would not be a candidate in the special election.

The primary elections were won by Republican former Bogota Mayor Steve Lonegan and Democratic Newark Mayor Cory Booker. Booker defeated Lonegan on October 16, 2013, and became the first African American elected to statewide office in New Jersey. 24.5% of registered voters cast ballots, making this the lowest voter turnout of any statewide election.

== Background ==
Those who were interested in running in the special primary election were given until June 10 to collect 1,000 signatures in order to appear on the special primary ballots. The primary elections were held on August 13, 2013, to elect the Democratic and Republican nominees. On June 4, 2013, Christie announced he would set the special election on October 16, 2013. His decision was criticized for spending $24 million on the October special election despite the 2013 New Jersey gubernatorial election already being scheduled for November 5, 2013. It was thought that Christie took this action to benefit himself politically, believing that likely Democratic nominee Cory Booker's presence on the ballot would inspire higher turnout from minority voters who would also vote for Christie's Democratic gubernatorial opponent, Barbara Buono.

On June 4, 2013, Christie appointed Republican Attorney General Jeffrey Chiesa to fill the Senate vacancy, making him the first Republican U.S. senator from New Jersey since Nicholas F. Brady in 1982; Brady, coincidentally, was succeeded by Lautenberg. Chiesa announced that he would not run in the special election.

On June 13, 2013, the Appellate Division of the New Jersey Superior Court unanimously rejected the Democrats' challenge, which was brought by Somerset County Democratic chairwoman Marguerite M. Schaffer, to force Christie to change the special election date in October to the general election on November 5. They ruled "the Legislature has delegated broad authority to the State's governor" to set the election date. On June 20, 2013, the New Jersey Supreme Court declined to hear a follow-up challenge to the special election date.

New Jersey Democratic state senator Shirley Turner of Lawrenceville introduced legislation to move the general election on November 5 for all statewide offices, including governor, to the same date, October 16, as the U.S. Senate special election. This legislation was introduced in order to avoid spending an additional $12 million for a separate U.S. Senate election in October in addition to the general statewide election in November. A bill, A4237, passed both legislative houses on June 27, 2013. Another bill, A4249, allowing eligible voters who cast ballots on October 16 for senator to also vote early for the November general election, finally passed both legislative houses on June 27. Both bills were sent to Governor Christie for approval or veto with little expectation that either would be signed by Christie into law. The governor vetoed both bills on September 9, 2013.

The Christie administration looked into contingency plan options for additional state workers, transportation resources, voting machines and associated hardware, and skilled voting machine technicians in order to avoid any potential conflicts due to the short time span of 20 days between the special election and the general election. Use of any of these options would increase the cost of $12 million for the October election, which would be in addition to $12 million for the August primary, that were both estimated by the New Jersey Office of Legislative Services. Contingency plans would be needed due to potential scheduling and logistical conflicts in the use of the same voting machines for both elections. New Jersey state law requires voting machines to be locked down for 15 days after an election, in case a defeated candidate seeks a recount. Voting machines would also need to be set up several days in advance of the general election. The state has made arrangements to reimburse by December 31, 2013, all necessary expenses after an audit of submitted election costs by each of the County Boards of Elections.

== Republican primary ==
=== Candidates ===
==== Declared ====
- Alieta Eck, former president of the Association of American Physicians and Surgeons, founder of the Zarephath Health Center and health care reform advocate
- Steve Lonegan, former mayor of Bogota, former state director of Americans for Prosperity and candidate for governor in 2005 and 2009

==== Declined ====
- Jennifer Beck, state senator
- Jon Bramnick, minority leader of the New Jersey State Assembly
- Jeffrey Chiesa, incumbent U.S. senator
- Michael J. Doherty, state senator
- Thomas Kean Jr., minority leader of the New Jersey Senate and nominee for U.S. Senate in 2006
- Joe Kyrillos, state senator and nominee for the U.S. Senate in 2012
- Leonard Lance, U.S. representative
- Kevin J. O'Toole, state senator
- Geraldo Rivera, talk show host

=== Endorsements ===
Alieta Eck
- Brian D. Levine, mayor of Franklin Township
- Joseph Rudy Rullo, candidate for the U.S. Senate in 2012
Steve Lonegan
- Thomas Booth, Camden County Republican Organization chairman
- Michael Patrick Carroll, state assemblyman
- Jeff Chiesa, incumbent U.S. senator
- Chris Christie, governor of New Jersey
- John DiMaio, state assemblyman
- Michael J. Doherty, state senator
- Michael Donohue, Cape May County Republican Organization chairman
- Rodney Frelinghuysen, U.S. representative (NJ-11)
- Scott Garrett, U.S. representative (NJ-05)
- Henry Kuhl, Hunterdon County Republican Organization chairman
- Leonard Lance, U.S. representative (NJ-07)
- Frank LoBiondo, U.S. representative (NJ-02)
- Phil Morin, Union County Republican Organization chairman
- Ron Paul, former U.S representative and candidate for president in 2008 and 2012
- Jon Runyan, U.S. representative (NJ-3)
- John Sette, Morris County Republican Organization chairman
- Chris Smith, U.S. representative (NJ-04)
- Bob Yudin, Bergen County Republican Organization chairman
- Eagle Forum

=== Polling ===
| Poll source | Date(s) administered | Sample size | Margin of error | Alieta Eck | Steve Lonegan | Other | Undecided |
|---|---|---|---|---|---|---|---|
| Kean University | June 18, 2013 | 321 | ±?% | 15% | 45% | 12% | 29% |
| Quinnipiac | July 2–7, 2013 | 330 | ±5.4% | 5% | 62% | 1% | 32% |
| Quinnipiac | August 1–5, 2013 | 257 | ±6.1% | 10% | 74% | 3% | 13% |

Results by county: Lonegan—>90% Lonegan—80–90% Lonegan—70–80% Lonegan—60–70%

=== Results ===
Republican primary results
| Party | Candidate | Votes | % |
|---|---|---|---|
| Republican | Steve Lonegan | 103,280 | 80.09% |
| Republican | Alieta Eck | 25,669 | 19.91% |
| Total votes | | 128,958 | 100.00% |

== Democratic primary ==
=== Candidates ===
==== Declared ====
- Cory Booker, mayor of Newark
- Rush Holt Jr., U.S. representative
- Sheila Oliver, speaker of the New Jersey General Assembly
- Frank Pallone, U.S. representative

==== Declined ====
- Rob Andrews, U.S. representative
- Beth Mason, Hoboken city councilwoman
- Stephen M. Sweeney, president of the New Jersey Senate

=== Endorsements ===
Cory Booker

Statewide endorsements

- Bill Bradley, former U.S. senator (NJ)
- Joseph DiVincenzo, Essex County executive
- Beth Mason, Hoboken city councilwoman
- George Norcross, businessman and Democratic fundraiser
- Jim Whelan, state senator

National endorsements

- Mo Cowan, former U.S. senator (MA)
- Martin O'Malley, governor of Maryland
- Ivanka Trump, businesswoman and daughter of Donald Trump
- Mark Zuckerberg, co-founder of Facebook
- The New York Times
- The Philadelphia Inquirer
Rush D. Holt, Jr.
- Mercer County Democratic Committee
- Sussex County Democrats straw poll
Frank Pallone
- Vin Gopal, chairman of the Monmouth County Democratic Committee

=== Debates ===
- Complete video of debate, August 5, 2013 - C-SPAN

=== Polling ===
| Poll source | Date(s) administered | Sample size | Margin of error | Cory Booker | Rush D. Holt Jr. | Sheila Oliver | Frank Pallone | Other | Undecided |
|---|---|---|---|---|---|---|---|---|---|
| Rutgers-Eagleton | June 3–9, 2013 | 364 | ±5.1% | 55% | 8% | — | 9% | — | 28% |
| Quinnipiac | June 7–9, 2013 | 306 | ±5.6% | 53% | 10% | — | 9% | 1% | 27% |
| Monmouth | June 10–11, 2013 | 205 | ±6.9% | 63% | 10% | 6% | 8% | — | 13% |
| Rasmussen | June 12–13, 2013 | 416 | ±5% | 54% | 11% | 5% | 8% | 3% | 18% |
| Kean University | June 18, 2013 | 366 | ±?% | 49% | 9% | 9% | 6% | 5% | 22% |
| Quinnipiac | July 2–7, 2013 | 400 | ±4.9% | 52% | 8% | 3% | 10% | 1% | 27% |
| Monmouth | July 11–14, 2013 | 403 | ±4.9% | 49% | 8% | 3% | 12% | — | 28% |
| Quinnipiac | August 1–5, 2013 | 388 | ±5% | 54% | 15% | 5% | 17% | 1% | 8% |

Results by county: Booker—70–80% Booker—60–70% Booker—50–60% Booker—40–50% Booker—30–40% Pallone—40–50% Holt—50–60%

=== Results ===
Democratic primary results
| Party | Candidate | Votes | % |
|---|---|---|---|
| Democratic | Cory Booker | 216,936 | 59.17% |
| Democratic | Frank Pallone | 72,584 | 19.80% |
| Democratic | Rush Holt Jr. | 61,463 | 16.76% |
| Democratic | Sheila Oliver | 15,656 | 4.27% |
| Total votes | | 366,639 | 100.00% |

== Special election ==
Booker enjoyed advantages over Lonegan in fundraising and name recognition. However, he was scrutinized regarding "his personal finances and the terms of his departure from law firm Trenk DiPasquale; the viability of his video startup, Waywire, and the investors behind it; and his behavior on Twitter, including messages to an Oregon stripper". Booker "also drew criticism from the left over his progressive credentials." Booker painted Lonegan as a "tea-party extremist", while Lonegan questioned Booker's performance as Mayor of Newark.

=== Candidates ===
==== Major party candidates ====
- Cory Booker (Democratic), mayor of Newark
- Steve Lonegan (Republican), former mayor of Bogota, former state director of Americans for Prosperity and candidate for governor in 2005 and 2009

==== Other candidates ====
- Robert Depasquale, Independent
- Eugene M. LaVergne, D-R Party
- Stuart Meissner, Alimony Reform Now
- Pablo Olivera, Unity is Strength
- Antonio N. Sabas, Independent
- Edward C. Stackhouse Jr., Ed the Barber

=== Debates ===
- Complete video of debate, October 9, 2013 - C-SPAN

=== Fundraising ===
| Candidate (party) | Receipts | Disbursements | Cash on hand | Debt |
|---|---|---|---|---|
| Cory Booker (D) | $2,108,248 | $2,582,837 | $4,533,079 | $0 |
| Steve Lonegan (R) | $129,766 | $171,538 | $192,586 | $101,822 |
Source: Federal Election Commission Reports through July 24, 2013

==== Top contributors ====
| Cory Booker | Contribution | Steve Lonegan | Contribution |
|---|---|---|---|
| Quinn Emanuel Urquhart & Sullivan | $34,800 | Lance for Congress | $2,000 |
| Time Warner | $33,000 | | |
| Slate Path Capital | $23,400 | | |
| Loews Corporation | $20,000 | | |
| Cole, Schotz, Meisel, Forman & Leonard, PA | $19,050 | | |
| Lazard | $18,500 | | |
| Monness, Crespi, Hardt & Co Inc. | $15,600 | | |
| Walt Disney Company | $15,200 | | |
| Falcon Edge Capital | $15,000 | | |
| Harvest Partners | $15,000 | | |
Source: OpenSecrets

==== Top industries ====
| Cory Booker | Contribution | Steve Lonegan | Contribution |
|---|---|---|---|
| Financial institutions | $314,500 | Candidate committees | $5,000 |
| Lawyers/law firms | $156,725 | Republican/Conservative | $500 |
| Entertainment industry | $131,000 | Misc Issues | $250 |
| Real estate | $115,390 | Pro-life organizations | $250 |
| Business services | $63,050 | | |
| Misc. finance | $62,850 | | |
| Retired | $54,700 | | |
| Nonprofit organizations | $48,100 | | |
| Manufacturing & distributing | $42,600 | | |
| Universities | $34,500 | | |
Source: OpenSecrets

=== Predictions ===
| Source | Rating | As of |
|---|---|---|
| Sabato's Crystal Ball | Safe D (flip) | June 27, 2013 |

=== Polling ===
| Poll source | Date(s) administered | Sample size | Margin of error | Steve Lonegan (R) | Cory Booker (D) | Other | Undecided |
|---|---|---|---|---|---|---|---|
| Quinnipiac | June 7–9, 2013 | 858 | ±3.4% | 27% | 54% | — | 18% |
| Monmouth | June 10–11, 2013 | 560 | ±4.2% | 37% | 53% | — | 10% |
| Rasmussen | June 10–11, 2013 | 1,000 | ±3% | 33% | 50% | — | 17% |
| Quinnipiac | July 2–7, 2013 | 1,068 | ±3% | 30% | 53% | 1% | 16% |
| Quinnipiac | August 1–5, 2013 | 2,042 | ±2.2% | 29% | 54% | 1% | 16% |
| Monmouth | August 15–18, 2013 | 696 | ±3.7% | 38% | 54% | 2% | 5% |
| Fairleigh Dickinson University | August 21–27, 2013 | 700 | ±3.7% | 22% | 50% | 4% | 23% |
| Rutgers-Eagleton | September 3–9, 2013 | 462 | ±4.5% | 29% | 64% | 1% | 6% |
| Pulse Opinion Research | September 19, 2013 | 1,000 | ±? | 33% | 52% | 4% | 10% |
| Stockton Polling Institute | September 15–21, 2013 | 812 | ±3.4% | 32.3% | 58.4% | — | 9.1% |
| Quinnipiac | September 19–22, 2013 | 948 | ±3.2% | 41% | 53% | 1% | 6% |
| Monmouth | September 26–29, 2013 | 571 | ±4.1% | 40% | 53% | 3% | 4% |
| Fairleigh Dickinson University | September 30 – October 5, 2013 | 702 | ±3.7% | 29% | 45% | 3% | 23% |
| Rasmussen | October 7, 2013 | 1,000 | ±3% | 41% | 53% | 1% | 5% |
| Quinnipiac | October 5–7, 2013 | 899 | ±3.3% | 41% | 53% | 1% | 5% |
| Stockton Polling Institute | October 3–8, 2013 | 729 | ±3.6% | 39% | 50% | — | 11% |
| Monmouth | October 10–12, 2013 | 1,393 | ±2.6% | 42% | 52% | 2% | 4% |
| Rutgers-Eagleton | October 7–13, 2013 | 513 | ±4.3% | 36% | 58% | 3% | 3% |
| Harper Polling | October 13–14, 2013 | 778 | ±3.5% | 41% | 52% | 2% | 5% |
| Quinnipiac | October 10–14, 2013 | 1,696 | ±2.4% | 40% | 54% | — | 5% |

Hypothetical polling

With Holt Jr.

| Poll source | Date(s) administered | Sample size | Margin of error | Steve Lonegan (R) | Rush D. Holt Jr. (D) | Other | Undecided |
|---|---|---|---|---|---|---|---|
| Quinnipiac | June 7–9, 2013 | 858 | ±3.4% | 31% | 36% | 1% | 32% |
| Monmouth | June 10–11, 2013 | 560 | ±4.2% | 41% | 44% | — | 15% |
| Quinnipiac | July 2–7, 2013 | 1,068 | ±3% | 36% | 37% | 3% | 24% |

With Oliver

| Poll source | Date(s) administered | Sample size | Margin of error | Steve Lonegan (R) | Sheila Oliver (D) | Other | Undecided |
|---|---|---|---|---|---|---|---|
| Monmouth | June 10–11, 2013 | 560 | ±4.2% | 42% | 44% | — | 14% |
| Quinnipiac | July 2–7, 2013 | 1,068 | ±3% | 37% | 35% | 3% | 16% |

With Pallone

| Poll source | Date(s) administered | Sample size | Margin of error | Steve Lonegan (R) | Frank Pallone (D) | Other | Undecided |
|---|---|---|---|---|---|---|---|
| Quinnipiac | June 7–9, 2013 | 858 | ±3.4% | 29% | 39% | 2% | 31% |
| Monmouth | June 10–11, 2013 | 560 | ±4.2% | 40% | 45% | — | 14% |
| Quinnipiac | July 2–7, 2013 | 1,068 | ±3% | 34% | 38% | 3% | 25% |

=== Results ===
Booker defeated Lonegan on October 16, 2013. Booker resigned as mayor of Newark on October 30, 2013, and was sworn in on October 31, 2013, as the junior U.S. senator from New Jersey.

United States Senate special election in New Jersey, 2013
| Party | Candidate | Votes | % | ±% |
|---|---|---|---|---|
| Democratic | Cory Booker | 740,742 | 54.92% | −1.11% |
| Republican | Steve Lonegan | 593,684 | 44.02% | +2.07% |
| Independent | Edward C. Stackhouse Jr. | 5,138 | 0.38% | N/A |
| Independent | Robert Depasquale | 3,137 | 0.23% | N/A |
| Independent | Stuart Meissner | 2,051 | 0.15% | N/A |
| Independent | Pablo Olivera | 1,530 | 0.11% | N/A |
| Independent | Antonio Nico Sabas | 1,336 | 0.10% | N/A |
| Independent | Eugene M. LaVergne | 1,041 | 0.08% | N/A |
| Total votes | | 1,348,659 | 100.00% | N/A |
| Democratic gain from Republican | | | | |

==== By county ====
| County | Cory Booker Democratic | | Steve Lonegan Republican | | Various candidates Other parties | | Margin | | Total votes cast |
| County | # | % | # | % | # | % | # | % | Total votes cast |
|---|---|---|---|---|---|---|---|---|---|
| Atlantic | 19,469 | 50.42% | 18,637 | 48.27% | 506 | 1.31% | 832 | 2.15% | 38,612 |
| Bergen | 82,526 | 56.75% | 61,622 | 42.38% | 1,266 | 0.87% | 20,904 | 14.37% | 145,414 |
| Burlington | 42,543 | 54.72% | 34,224 | 44.02% | 984 | 1.26% | 8,319 | 10.70% | 77,751 |
| Camden | 47,474 | 64.95% | 24,758 | 33.87% | 860 | 1.18% | 22,716 | 31.08% | 73,092 |
| Cape May | 7,080 | 39.87% | 10,432 | 58.75% | 244 | 1.37% | -3,352 | -18.88% | 17,756 |
| Cumberland | 8,069 | 51.13% | 7,496 | 47.50% | 217 | 1.37% | 573 | 3.63% | 15,782 |
| Essex | 92,384 | 77.78% | 24,929 | 20.99% | 1,460 | 1.23% | 67,455 | 56.79% | 118,773 |
| Gloucester | 21,240 | 49.71% | 20,871 | 48.85% | 613 | 1.43% | 369 | 0.86% | 42,724 |
| Hudson | 47,683 | 77.68% | 12,830 | 20.90% | 871 | 1.42% | 34,853 | 56.78% | 61,384 |
| Hunterdon | 10,781 | 37.54% | 17,593 | 61.26% | 345 | 1.20% | -6,812 | -23.72% | 28,719 |
| Mercer | 38,934 | 65.78% | 18,576 | 31.38% | 1,682 | 2.84% | 20,358 | 34.40% | 59,192 |
| Middlesex | 61,362 | 57.73% | 43,644 | 41.06% | 1,284 | 1.21% | 17,718 | 16.67% | 106,290 |
| Monmouth | 49,340 | 45.01% | 59,059 | 53.87% | 1,231 | 1.12% | -9,719 | -8.86% | 109,630 |
| Morris | 41,317 | 42.65% | 54,665 | 56.43% | 889 | 0.92% | −13,348 | −13.78% | 96,871 |
| Ocean | 36,665 | 34.63% | 68,166 | 64.38% | 1,050 | 0.99% | -31,501 | -29.75% | 105,881 |
| Passaic | 37,378 | 58.97% | 25,263 | 39.86% | 744 | 1.17% | 12,115 | 19.11% | 63,385 |
| Salem | 3,903 | 38.10% | 5,598 | 54.65% | 743 | 7.25% | -1,695 | -16.55% | 10,244 |
| Somerset | 28,539 | 48.85% | 29,304 | 50.16% | 578 | 0.99% | −765 | −1.31% | 58,421 |
| Sussex | 9,252 | 33.75% | 17,796 | 64.93% | 362 | 1.32% | -8,544 | -31.18% | 36,060 |
| Union | 48,991 | 63.68% | 27,152 | 35.30% | 785 | 1.02% | 21,839 | 28.38% | 76,928 |
| Warren | 5,812 | 34.00% | 11,069 | 64.76% | 211 | 1.24% | -5,257 | -30.76% | 17,092 |
| Totals | 740,742 | 54.92% | 593,684 | 44.02% | 14,233 | 1.06% | 147,058 | 10.90% | 1,348,659 |

Counties that flipped from Democratic to Republican

- Salem (largest municipality: Pennsville Township)

==== By congressional district ====
Booker and Lonegan each won six of 12 congressional districts.

| District | Lonegan | Booker | Representative |
|---|---|---|---|
| 1st | 37.33% | 61.54% | Rob Andrews |
| 2nd | 53.1% | 45.7% | Frank LoBiondo |
| 3rd | 52.73% | 46.25% | Jon Runyan |
| 4th | 57.31% | 41.35% | Chris Smith |
| 5th | 50.25% | 49.0% | Scott Garrett |
| 6th | 42.93% | 55.97% | Frank Pallone Jr. |
| 7th | 55.31% | 43.81% | Leonard Lance |
| 8th | 20.46% | 78.1% | Albio Sires |
| 9th | 33.1% | 65.83% | Bill Pascrell |
| 10th | 12.63% | 86.23% | Donald Payne Jr. |
| 11th | 52.49% | 46.69% | Rodney Frelinghuysen |
| 12th | 34.15% | 64.8% | Rush Holt Jr. |

== See also ==
- 2013 United States Senate special election in Massachusetts
- 2014 United States Senate election in New Jersey
