= Frederick Mason =

Frederick Mason may refer to:

- Frederick Mason (diplomat) (1913–2008), British diplomat
- Frederick Mason (wrestler) (1889–1961), British wrestler
- Dick Mason (Frederick Richard Mason) (1881–1936), New Zealand cricketer
- Fred Mason (Frederick Oliver Mason, 1901–?), English footballer

== See also ==
- Frederick Mason Creek, an inflow to Swan Bay
