= Francis Mason =

Francis Mason may refer to:

- Francis Mason (missionary) (1799–1874), American missionary and naturalist
- Francis Mason (priest) (c. 1566–1621), English churchman
- Francis Mason (politician) (1843–1915), Australian politician
- Francis Mason (Royal Navy officer) (1779–1853)
- F. Van Wyck Mason (1901–1978), American historian and novelist

== See also ==
- Frank Mason (disambiguation)
- Frances Mason, British classical violinist
