= Kenneth Mason =

Kenneth or Ken Mason may refer to:

- Kenneth Mason (cricketer) (1881–1974), Barbadian cricketer
- Kenneth Mason (geographer) (1887–1976), British Army officer and geographer
- Ken Mason (pathologist) (1919–2017), British Royal Air Force medical officer and forensic pathologist
- Ken Mason (bishop) (1928–2018), Australian Anglican bishop
- Ken Mason (footballer) (fl. 1947), New Zealand footballer
