= Leonard Mason =

Leonard Mason may refer to:

- Leonard Edward Mason (c. 1913–2005), American anthropologist
- Leonard F. Mason (1920–1944), United States Marine Corps soldier and Medal of Honor recipient
  - USS Leonard F. Mason
- Len Mason (1903–1953, Leonard Tasman Mason), New Zealand rugby league player
