= Patrick Mason =

Patrick Mason may refer to:

- Patrick Mason (theatre director), British theatre director
- Patrick Mason (economist), American economist
- Patrick Q. Mason, American historian
- Pat Mason, American college baseball coach

== See also ==
- Mason Patrick (1863–1942), United States Army general
