= Albert Mason =

Albert Mason may refer to:

- Albert L. Mason (1824–1896), member of the Wisconsin State Assembly
- Albert Abraham Mason (1926–2018), English anesthesiologist
