= Newton Mason =

Newton Mason may refer to:

- Newton E. Mason (1850–1945), United States Navy rear admiral
- Newton Henry Mason (1918–1942), United States Navy ensign, posthumous recipient of the Distinguished Flying Cross
