= Edgar Mason =

Edgar Mason may refer to:

- Mason Rudolph (golfer) (Edgar Mason Rudolph, 1934–2011), American golfer
- Edgar Mason (columnist) (Edgar Federico Mason Villalobos, 1953–1996), Mexican columnist
