= Arthur Mason =

Arthur Mason may refer to:

- Arthur Mason (footballer) (1909–1971), Australian rules footballer for North Melbourne
- Arthur Mason (trade unionist) (died 1933), British trade unionist
- Arthur James Mason (1851–1928), English clergyman, theologian and classical scholar
- Arthur John Mason (1869–1946), Australian organist and journalist
- Arthur Pendleton Mason (1835–1893), American Confederate Army soldier

member of the prominent Mason family of Virginia

- Arthur T. Mason (1902–1980), United States Marine Corps general
- Sir Arthur Weir Mason (1860–1924), South African judge

== See also ==
- Arthur Mason Worthington (1852–1916), English physicist and educator
