= James Mason (disambiguation) =

James Mason (1909–1984) was an English actor.

James, Jim, Jimmy, or Jem Mason may also refer to:

== Actors ==
- James Mason (American actor) (1889–1959), character performer from 1910s to 1950s
- James Mason (Australian actor), film and television actor

== Politicians ==
- James Brown Mason (1775–1819), American legislator from Rhode Island
- James M. Mason (1798–1871), American legislator and Confederate diplomat from Virginia
- James W. Mason (1841–1875), African-American legislator from Arkansas
- James Mason (Canadian politician) (1843–1918), banker, brigadier general and senator
- James Mason (British politician) (1861–1929), MP for Windsor, 1906–1918
- Jim Mason (Ohio politician), member Ohio House of Representatives, 1993–1998
- Jimmy Mason (politician), member of the New Mexico House of Representatives
- James Mason (neo-Nazi) (born 1952), American neo-Nazi
- James Mason (burgess), Virginia planter, real estate investor and politician
- James Mason (New Hampshire politician), member of the New Hampshire House of Representatives

== Sportspeople ==
=== Footballers ===
- Jim Mason (footballer) (before 1875–after 1909), English forward for Burslem Port Vale
- Jimmy Mason (footballer, born 1919) (1919–1971), Scottish inside forward for Third Lanark
- Jimmy Mason (footballer, born 1933), Scottish midfielder

=== Other sportspeople ===
- Jem Mason (1816–1866), English jockey; 1839 Grand National winner
- James Mason (chess player) (1849–1905), British (Irish) master
- James Mason (cricketer) (1876–1938), English player
- James Mason (field hockey) (born 1947), Australian player
- Jim Mason (baseball) (born 1950), American MLB shortstop
- James Mason (golfer) (born 1951), American professional golfer
- James Mason (wrestler) (born 1979) British professional wrestler, former member of Team Britain

== Other people ==
- James Mason (health administrator) (1864–1924), New Zealand doctor and public health administrator
- James O. Mason (1930–2019), American surgeon general and leader in the Church of Jesus Christ of Latter-day Saints
- James Cheney Mason (born 1943), American lawyer
- James Mason (bishop) (born 1954), Solomon Islander bishop of Hanuato'o
- Jim Mason (activist) (born 1940), American author and animal rights advocate
- James Scott Mason (1873–1912), British colonial administrator

== Other uses ==
- Jim Mason, protagonist portrayed by George Raft in 1939's King of the Turf
- James Mason, a GWR 3031 Class British locomotive
