= Larry Mason =

Larry Mason may refer to:

- Larry Mason (American football) (born 1961), American football player
- Larry Mason (speed skater) (1935–2004), Canadian speed skater
- M. L. Mason, known as Larry, justice of the Iowa Supreme Court
