= Matthew Mason =

Matthew or Matt Mason may refer to:

- Matt Mason (author) (born 1978), author and creative executive
- Matt Mason (poet) (born 1968), poet based in Omaha, Nebraska
- Matt Mason (cricketer) (born 1974), cricketer who represented Western Australia and Worcestershire
- Matthew Mason (Welsh cricketer) (born 1984), Welsh cricketer
- Matthew T. Mason (born 1952), American roboticist
- Major Matt Mason, an action figure created by Mattel
- Major Matt Mason USA, performing name of Matt Roth, New York City-based musician and record producer
- Matthew Mason-Cox, Australian politician
- Matt Mason (singer) (born 1980s), singer based in Nashville, Tennessee
- Matt Mason, a character on the U.S. television series Falling Skies
- Matt Mason (sailor), New Zealand sailor
- Matthew E. Mason, American historian

== See also ==
- Mason (surname)
