= Jonnie Kuper =

Jonnie Liteat Kuper was the second Bishop of Hanuato'o: he was consecrated and installed on 10 April 2005; and became vicar general for the Diocese of Central Melanesia.

Anglican Communion titles
Preceded by James Philip Mason	Bishop of Hanuato'o; 2005–2007	Succeeded by Alfred Karibongi
