= Helen Mason =

Helen Mason may refer to:

- Helen Mason (endocrinologist), British endocrinologist
- Helen Mason (journalist) (1938–1989), British journalist and children's author
- Helen Mason (physicist), British theoretical physicist
- Helen Mason (potter) (1915–2014), New Zealand potter
- Helen K. Mason (1912–2003), American theatre director
