= Senator Mason =

Senator Mason may refer to:

== Members of the United States Senate ==
- Armistead Thomson Mason (1787–1819), U.S. Senator from Virginia from 1816 to 1817
- James Murray Mason (1798–1871), U.S. Senator from Virginia from 1847 to 1861
- Jonathan Mason (Massachusetts politician) (1756–1831), U.S. Senator from Massachusetts from 1800 to 1803
- Jeremiah Mason (1768–1848), U.S. Senator from New Hampshire from 1813 to 1817
- Stevens Thomson Mason (Virginia politician) (1760–1803), U.S. Senator from Virginia from 1794 to 1803
- William E. Mason (American politician) (1850–1921), U.S. Senator from Illinois from 1897 to 1903

== United States state senate members ==
- Edward J. Mason (politician) (1930–2020), Maryland State Senate
- Edwyn E. Mason (1913–2003), New York State Senate
- Garrett Mason (born 1985), Maine State Senate
- James W. Mason (1841–1875), Arkansas State Senate
- John E. Mason (1854–1910), Virginia State Senate
- John Y. Mason (1799–1859), Virginia State Senate
- Lance Mason (born 1967), Ohio State Senate
- Lowell B. Mason (1893–1983), Illinois State Senate
- Monty Mason (born 1967), Virginia State Senate
- Noah M. Mason (1882–1965), Illinois State Senate
- Ralph L. Mason (1896–1977), Maryland State Senate
- Samson Mason (1793–1869), Ohio State Senate
