= Masotti =

Masotti is an Italian surname. It loosely means son of Maso, and the name Maso is derived from Tommaso, the Italian form of the name Thomas.

Notable people with this surname include:

- Baptiste Masotti (born 1995), French professional squash player
- Fabio Masotti (born 1974), Italian amateur road and track cyclist
- Ignazio Masotti (1817–1888), Italian cardinal
- Paul Masotti (born 1965), Canadian football player
