= Justice Mason =

Justice Mason may refer to:

- Anthony Mason (judge) (born 1925), chief justice of the High Court of Australia
- Charles Mason (Iowa judge) (1804–1882), chief justice of the Iowa Supreme Court
- Charles Mason (New York judge) (1810–1879), judge of the New York Court of Appeals
- Charles W. Mason (1887–1969), associate justice of the Oklahoma Supreme Court
- Henry F. Mason (1860–1927), associate justice of the Kansas Supreme Court
- John Thomson Mason Jr. (1815–1873), judge of the Maryland Court of Appeals
- John W. Mason (1842–1917), associate justice of the Supreme Court of Appeals of West Virginia
- M. L. Mason (1906–1990), associate justice of the Iowa Supreme Court
- Oliver P. Mason (1829–1891), associate justice of the Nebraska Supreme Court
- Thomson Mason (1733–1785), chief justice of the Supreme Court of Virginia
