= Charles Mason (disambiguation) =

Charles Mason (1728–1786) was a British astronomer.

Charles or Charlie Mason may also refer to:

== Arts and entertainment ==
- C. Post Mason (died 1918), American director, singer and manager
- Charlie Mason (lyricist), American lyricist
- Charlie Mason (EastEnders), fictional character from British soap opera EastEnders

== Law and politics ==
- Charles Mason (MP) (1661–1739), member of parliament (MP) for Bishop's Castle, and for Montgomery Boroughs
- Charles Mason (Iowa judge) (1804–1882), American lawyer, judge, and engineer
- Charles Mason (New York judge) (1810–1879), New York judge
- Charles Holland Mason (1822–1894), American politician and lawyer
- Charles H. Mason (1830–1859), Washington Territory politician
- Charles A. Mason (fl. 1880s), American politician, Flint, Michigan mayor
- Charles W. Mason (1887–1969), justice of the Oklahoma Supreme Court

== Sports ==
- Charlie Mason (1870s outfielder) (1853–1936), American baseball player
- Charlie Mason (footballer, born 1863) (1863–1941), English international footballer
- Charles Mason (cricketer) (1871–1945), English cricketer and solicitor
- Charles B. Mason (1873–1935), American football coach
- Charlie Mason (striker) (fl. 1890s), English footballer for Port Vale
- Charlie Mason (1920s outfielder) (1894–?), American Negro leagues baseball player
- Charles Mason (rower) (1908–1999), American Olympic rower
- Charlie Mason (ice hockey) (1912–1971), Canadian ice hockey player
- Charles Mason (wrestler) (born 1993), American professional wrestler

== Other ==
- Charles Mason (academic and clergyman) (c. 1699–1770), academic and clergyman, Woodwardian Professor of Geology, University of Cambridge
- Charles Harrison Mason (1864–1961), American bishop; founder of the Church of God in Christ
- Charles P. Mason (1891–1971), U.S. Navy admiral, naval aviator and mayor of Pensacola
- C. Avery Mason (1904–1970), American bishop of the Episcopal Diocese of Dallas
- Charles William Mason (1884–1917), agricultural entomologist in British India

== Other uses ==
- USS Charlie B. Mason, a United States Navy patrol vessel in commission from 1917 to 1918
