= Norman Mason =

Norman or Norm Mason may refer to:

- Norman Mason (American musician) (before 1900–after 1969), American jazz multi-instrumentalist and bandleader
- Norm Mason (1914–1996), Australian rules footballer who played with South Melbourne
- Norman Byron Mason (1938–2006), Canadian blues musician whose stage name was Dutch Mason
- Norman Mason (canoeist) (born 1952), British competitor at 1976 Summer Olympics
