= Elizabeth Mason =

Elizabeth Mason may refer to:

- Elizabeth Mason (sculptor) (1880–1953), American sculptor
- Elizabeth Sadoques Mason (1897–1985), one of the first Native American registered nurses
- Beth Mason (born 1960), American politician in Hoboken, New Jersey
- Elizabeth Rogers Mason Cabot (1834–1920), née Mason, American diarist and philanthropist

== See also ==
- Elisabeth Mason, American lawyer and venture philanthropist
