= Diocese of Hanuato'o =

Coordinates: 10°27′S 161°55′E

The Diocese of Hanuato'o is one of the ten current dioceses of the Anglican Church of Melanesia; it was erected in 1991 and inaugurated at St George's Church, Kirakira on St Peter's Day, 29 June 1991. That church is now her cathedral, rededicated as St Peter's Cathedral; the diocese is divided into fifteen parishes.

== List of bishops ==
Bishops of Hanuato'o
From	Until	Incumbent	Notes
1991	2004	James Mason	James Philip Mason, first bishop; consecrated and installed on 19 June 1991; resigned 31 December 2004.
2005	2007	Jonnie Kuper	Jonnie Liteat Kuper, second bishop; consecrated and installed on 10 April 2005; became vicar general for the Diocese of Central Melanesia.
2007	2020	Alfred Karibongi	Third bishop; elected July 2007; consecrated and installed on 30 September 2007. Retired 16 August 2020.
2021	present	Arthur Abui	Elected 22 January; consecrated 21 March 2021.

== Sources ==
- Anglican Church of Melanesia — Diocese of Hanuato'o
