= Michael Mason =

Michael Mason or Mike Mason may refer to:

- Michael Mason (cricketer) (born 1974), New Zealand cricketer
- Michael Mason (high jumper) (born 1986), Canadian high jumper
- Michael Mason (politician), American politician
- Michael Mason (soccer) (born 1971), American-German soccer player
- Michael Mason (swimmer) (born 1974), American swimmer
- Michael Atwood Mason (born 1966), American folklorist and museum professional
- Michael Paul Mason (born 1971), American author and journalist
- Mike Mason (baseball) (born 1958), retired Major League Baseball player

== See also ==
- Michelle Mason
