= Alfred Karibongi =

Alfred Karibongi was the third Bishop of Hanuato'o: he was elected in July 2007; and consecrated and installed on 30 September 2007. He retired effective 16 August 2020.

Anglican Communion titles
Preceded by Jonnie Liteat Kuper	Bishop of Hanuato'o; 2007–2020	Succeeded by Arthur Abui
