= Edgar Mason (columnist) =

Mexican columnist

- Born: Edgar Federico Mason Villalobos; 1953
- Died: 28 November 1996 (aged 42–43); Huitzilac, Morelos, Mexico
- Cause of death: Gunshot wound
- Education: National Autonomous University of Mexico School of Economics
- Occupations: Columnist; Economist; Journalist
- Employer(s): Panamerican University, Monterrey Institute of Technology and Higher Education, El Financiero, Novedades de México, El Informador
- Spouse: Elizabeth del Consuelo Romo Medrano
- Awards: Premio de Economía "Negobank" (1976)

Edgar Federico Mason Villalobos (1953 – 28 November 1996) was a Mexican columnist, economist, and journalist.

== Biography ==
Born in 1953, Mason studied the career of Economics at the National Autonomous University of Mexico School of Economics. Obtained his title in 1983. In addition to performing his occupation and being a professor of Economics at Panamerican University, Intercontinental University, and the Monterrey Institute of Technology and Higher Education (ITESM), he dedicated himself to economic and political analyses, and journalism. He was a columnist in the Mexican newspapers El Financiero, Novedades de México, El Norte, and El Informador, as well as in La Nación, i.e. the monthly official magazine of the National Action Party (PAN); the Mexican weekly magazine Impacto, and the U.S. magazines Background and Weekly Review.

=== Death ===
On 28 November 1996, columnist Mason was killed by a firearm shot, in his residence of Senda Encantadora #24, Fraccionamiento Real de Montecassino, in Huitzilac (north of Cuernavaca), State of Morelos. A press release from the Attorney General of the State of Morelos (Procuraduria General de Justicia del Estado de Morelos, PGJEM), said that according to the first investigations, the cause of the crime was the theft of goods. Days later, the Inter American Press Association (SIP) sent a letter to the then governor of the State of Morelos, Jorge Carrillo Olea, in which they requested an investigation about the causes of the journalist's murder.

== Published books ==
He was the author of more than fifteen books, including: Luz y sombra del Tratado de Libre Comercio, México y sus mexicanos: Una explicación sobre la idiosincrasia mexicana, La otra crisis que viene, México: crisis y supercrisis. (Light and shadow of the Free Trade Agreement, Mexico and its Mexicans: an explanation about Mexican idiosyncrasy, The other crisis that is coming, Mexico: crisis and supercrisis.)

== Award ==
- "Negobank" Economics Award, in 1976.

== See also ==
- List of journalists killed in Mexico
