= Jerry Mason =

Jerry Mason may refer to:

- Jerry Mason (singer) (born 1942), American singer, songwriter, guitar player, and entertainer
- Jerry Mason (footballer), English footballer
- Jerry Mason (editor), pulp magazine editor
