= Admiral Mason =

Admiral Mason may refer to:

- Charles P. Mason (1891–1971), U.S. Navy vice admiral
- James O. Mason (1930–2019), U.S. Public Health Service Commissioned Corps admiral
- Lynn Mason (born 1942), Canadian Forces vice admiral
- Newton E. Mason (1850–1945), U.S. Navy rear admiral
- Thomas Henry Mason (1811–1900), British Royal Navy admiral
