= Sara Mason =

Sara Mason may refer to:

- Sara Mason (actress) in Sell a Door Theatre Company
- Sara Mason (rally driver) in 2007 World Rally Championship season

== See also ==
- Sarah Mason (disambiguation)
