= Martin Mason =

Martin Mason may refer to:

- Martin Mason (Quaker) (1650–1676), English Quaker
- Martin Mason (pioneer) (c. 1765–1812), surgeon, magistrate and commander and pioneer settler of Australia
- Martin Mason Hazeltine (1827–1903), American photographer
