= Caroline Mason =

Caroline Mason may refer to:

- Caroline Atherton Mason (1823–1890), American poet
- Caroline Atwater Mason (1853–1939), American novelist and travel writer
- Dame Caroline Mason (charity executive), British charity executive
- Caroline B. Mason, American head of school for the Albany Academy
