= Jerry Mason (footballer) =

English footballer

Personal information
- Full name: Jeremiah Mason
- Place of birth: England
- Position: Defender

Senior career*
Years	Team	Apps	(Gls)
1889–1890	Wolverhampton Wanderers	7	(0)
- * Club domestic league appearances and goals

Jeremiah Mason was an English footballer who played in the Football League for Wolverhampton Wanderers.
