= Wells Mason =

American designer and sculptor (born 1968)

Wells Mason (born 1968 in Atlanta, Georgia) is an American designer and sculptor.

== Biography ==
He received his Bachelor of Arts degree from the University of Texas at Austin in 1990. In 1996, he founded his studio, Ironwood Industries, in Austin, Texas. In 1999, he moved his studio to Coupland, Texas. He opened his gallery, Wells Mason Gallery, in 2011 in Austin, Texas. He currently divides his time between Coupland and Austin.

Mason's furniture designs are typically associated with the Studio Furniture movement. Sometimes functional, sometimes not, his furniture combines seemingly disparate materials, like exquisite veneer or recycled wood coupled with forged or salvaged steel.

Mason's sculptures, on the other hand, are generally associated with Postmodernism and, more specifically, the Postminimalist art movement. His sculptures reference the clean lines and simple forms of Minimalism, but with an intellectual component that explores a particular idea or comments on a specific moment in time.

Architects such as I. M. Pei, Philip Johnson, Eric Own Moss, and Samuel Mockbee have influenced Mason's approach to furniture design. He further cites artists Isamu Noguchi and Donald Judd, poets Rumi and Pablo Neruda, and baseball player Yogi Berra as other sources of inspiration.

== Notable Collections ==
- The Mirror Series (2012 – Present): This sculpture series uses simple shapes and colors in opposition in order to suggest different degrees of self-awareness and mental health.
- The Umasi Collection (2005 – Present): This collection blurs the line between furniture and sculpture.
- The BigLittle Series (2008 – Present): This furniture series is playfully named for its union of large and small volumes.

== Special Commissions ==
Mason regularly works on special projects for high-profile clients, such as the Austin Children's Museum, Louis Vuitton, The Wall Street Journal, and Steven Holl Architects. In 2005, his studio was commissioned to make the built-in furniture for Turbulence House in northern New Mexico.

== Exhibitions/Awards ==
- 2012: "Seeing is Believing" Exhibit at the Wells Mason Gallery in Austin, Texas.
- 2009: "New American Talent" Exhibit at the Jones Center for Contemporary Art in Austin, Texas.
- 2009: "Transformations 7" Exhibit at the Society for Contemporary Craft in Pittsburgh, Pennsylvania.
- 2008: "The Umasi Collection: Incidental Furniture Design" Exhibit at Gensler in New York, New York.
- 2008: "CraftTexas 2008" Exhibit at the Center for Contemporary Craft in Houston, Texas.
- 2008: "Modern+Design+Function" Exhibit at Design Within Reach in Austin, Texas. The BigLittle Series was awarded 'Best Overall Design'.
- 2007: "Smithsonian Craft Show" at the National Building Museum in Washington, D.C. The Umasi Collection was awarded "Excellence in Design of the Future"
- 2006: "New American Talent" Exhibit at the Jones Center for Contemporary Art in Austin, Texas
- 2006: Texas Commission on the Arts selects Wells Mason as a "Texas Original" artists.

== In Print ==
- Wells Mason's "Big White Little Red" table from the BigLittle Series was featured in the book: '500 Tables' (2010) by Ray Hemachandra and Andrew Glasgow. Mason's "Big Black" credenza, also from the BigLittle Series, was featured in another of The 500 Series of books, titled: '500 Cabinets' (2009) by Ray Hemachandra and John Grew Sheridan.
