= Simon Mason =

Simon Mason may refer to:

- Simon Mason (author) (born 1962), British author
- Simon Mason (field hockey) (born 1973), English field hockey goalkeeper
- Simon Mason (rugby union) (born 1973), Ireland rugby union international
