= James Mason (bishop) =

- Bishop of Hanuato'o
- Church: Church of the Province of Melanesia
- Diocese: Diocese of Hanuato'o
- In office: 1991–2004
- Successor: Jonnie Kuper
- Other posts: Priest-in-charge of St Maurice, Plympton (2005–2016); Honorary assistant bishop, Diocese of Exeter (2007–2016)

Orders
- Ordination: 1981 (deacon); 1982 (priest)
- Consecration: 1991

Personal details
- Born: 1954 (age 71–72)
- Denomination: Anglican
- Education: Solomon Islands College of Higher Education; Bishop Patteson Theological College

James Philip Mason (born 1954) is a retired vicar in the Church of England and a former bishop in the Church of the Province of Melanesia.

Having graduated from the Solomon Islands College of Higher Education, he trained for the ministry at Bishop Patteson Theological College. He was ordained a deacon in 1981 and a priest in 1982. He served as curate of St Barnabas Cathedral, Honiara, 1981–1982, before becoming secretary to John Selwyn, archbishop of Melanesia (1983–1986), and returning to Bishop Patteson as a lecturer in 1987.

Mason then returned to St Barnabas Cathedral as dean from 1988 until his appointment as the first diocesan bishop of Hanuato'o in 1991. To that see he was consecrated and installed on 19 June 1991.

He resigned his see in 2004 and moved to the United Kingdom in 2005, becoming priest-in-charge of St Maurice, Plympton. He was licensed an honorary assistant bishop, Diocese of Exeter in 2007. He resigned both posts effective 29 June 2014.

Anglican Communion titles
New title	Bishop of Hanuato'o; 1991–2004	Succeeded by Jonnie Kuper
