= Masullo =

Masullo or Massullo is a surname of Italian origin. Notable people with the surname include:

- Carlo Massullo (born 1957), Italian modern pentathlete and Olympic champion
- Deb Massullo, Canadian female curler, World champion
- Francesco Paolo Masullo (1679–1733), Italian singer
- Marisa Masullo, former Italian athlete
- Ralph Massullo, American politician
