= Don Mason =

Don Mason may refer to:

- Don Mason (baseball) (1944–2018), American baseball player
- Don Mason (actor) (1929–1980), Canadian actor
- Don Mason (immunologist) (1934–2021), British immunologist
- Don Barry Mason (1950–2006), founder of the Psychedelic Shamanistic Institute
- Donald Mason (basketball), in 1982–83 Philadelphia 76ers season
