= Ronald Mason =

Ronald Mason may refer to:

- R. A. K. Mason (Ronald Allison Kells Mason, 1905–1971), New Zealand poet
- Ronald Mason (cricket writer) (1912–2001), English writer of novels, biographies, literary criticism and cricket books
- Ronald Mason (drama) (1926–1997), Northern Irish director and producer of drama for the BBC
- Ronald Mason Jr. (born 1953), American lawyer and university administrator
- Ron Mason (1940–2016), Canadian ice hockey player, head coach and university executive
- Ron G. Mason (1916–2009), British oceanographer
