= Ian Mason =

Ian Mason may refer to:

- Ian J. Mason, Australian ornithologist and taxonomist
- Ian Mason (cricketer) (1942–2017), New Zealand cricketer
