= Masucci =

Masucci is a surname. Notable people with the surname include:

- Agostino Masucci (c. 1691–1758), Italian painter
- Alexander "Alex" Masucci (born 1949), American music executive, producer, songwriter and promoter
- Gaetano Masucci (born 1984), Italian football player
- Giulia Masucci Fava (1858–?), Italian painter
- Jerry Masucci (1934–1997), American businessman
- Matias Masucci, Italian-born American actor and film director
- Oliver Masucci (born 1968), German actor

== See also ==
- Masuccio
