= Crystal Mason =

African-American woman

Crystal Mason is an African-American woman who was charged, convicted, and then acquitted for attempting to cast a vote while on federal supervised release during the 2016 United States presidential election. Mason was under supervised release after completing a five-year sentence for tax fraud, and was ineligible to vote according to Texas voting laws. After finding her name was not on the sign-in sheets at her polling place, a poll worker helped Mason to cast a provisional ballot. She was convicted three months later for voter fraud and sentenced to five years imprisonment, a punishment that gained national attention. On March 31, 2021 the Texas Court of Criminal Appeals agreed to consider Mason's appeal, and on March 28, 2024 her conviction was overturned.

== Background ==
Mason committed tax fraud by inflating refunds for her clients as a tax preparer, a crime for which she was arrested and pled guilty in 2011 and was sentenced in 2012. She was released after completing her sentence in 2016, and decided to vote in the 2016 election after being encouraged by her mother. Per a statement by the Tarrant County Criminal District Attorney Office, a letter detailing her inability to vote was sent shortly after her incarceration for tax fraud. Mason said she never received the letter, as she was already incarcerated. The state prohibits convicted felons from voting while they serve their sentence, while on parole, probation or under supervision.

Shortly before entering the White House, President-elect Donald Trump raised claims that 3 million illegal ballots had been cast in the 2016 election. In 2016, about 40,000 people in Texas cast provisional ballots that were later rejected. Additionally, in Tarrant County where she voted, more than 12,000 people have voted using a provisional ballot since 2014 with seven out of eight ballots rejected, and Mason seems to be the only voter who used this method to be charged with illegal voting.

== Voter fraud conviction ==
On November 8, 2016, Mason drove to her polling place in Rendon, Texas. When she attempted to sign in, the volunteer could not find her name on the sheets and gave her a provisional ballot that would be counted if her credential were valid. Written on the ballot is a statement that cautions individuals and explains that a person cannot vote if he or she is on supervised release as Mason was. Mason said she did not see the statement on the ballot, as an election worker was helping her. Mason was convicted and sentenced to five years imprisonment.

== Legal ==
Mason was convicted in 2018 for trying to vote in the 2016 election while on supervised release from her prior tax fraud felony conviction. During her initial trial, a probation official stated that he never told Mason that she could not vote, while Mason stated that she signed an affidavit that stated she was an eligible voter.

Mason was represented by the American Civil Liberties Union of Texas, the ACLU Voting Rights Project, the Texas Civil Rights Project, and two personal attorneys. In her appeal for the voter fraud conviction, Mason's defense team argued that it was unclear if Mason was truly ineligible to vote, or if she even voted since the provisional ballot was rejected and not tallied in the count.

In March 2020, three Texas judges of the Second District Court of Appeals rejected her appeal. Judge Wade Birdwell wrote the decision for the three judge panel, stating that the fact that Mason did not know she was legally ineligible to vote was irrelevant to her prosecution and that the state only needed to prove that she voted while knowing that she was under supervision and therefore ineligible. Tarrant County District Attorney Sharen Wilson offered Mason and her attorneys the option of probation instead of a jail sentence or a continued legal battle, but Mason refused.

On November 30, 2020, Mason's attorneys filed a petition with the Texas Court of Criminal Appeals to review the case. The petition asserts that the lower court ruling violates Texas law and conflicts with the Court's previous ruling in DeLay v. State. The conviction of former Republican U.S. Rep. Tom DeLay was thrown out on the basis that an individual must "know" that their conduct violates the Election Code. Andre Segura, legal director for the ACLU of Texas, was quoted in a press release, "The same result must apply to Crystal—a woman who was not aware she was ineligible to vote and had no reason to risk her liberty." On March 31, 2021, the Texas Court of Criminal Appeals agreed to consider Crystal Mason's appeal. On May 11, 2022, the court ruled that her conviction must be sent back to the appellate court for review. The court ruled that the lower court “erred by failing to require proof that [Mason] had actual knowledge that it was a crime for her to vote while on supervised release.”

On April 18, 2023, the Second District Court of Appeals heard oral arguments in the case. The only remaining question was whether Mason knew she was ineligible to vote. Judge Wade Birdwell said of the provisional ballot application form, “there’s nothing in this language that actually tells her she is ineligible.” The ruling, when made, could again be appealed by either side back to the Texas Court of Criminal Appeals.

On March 28, 2024, the Second District Court of Appeals overturned Mason's voter fraud conviction. The court said in the decision that there was no evidence Mason knew she was ineligible to vote when she cast her ballot — which is a condition that must be met in order to convict her of illegal voting.

On March 28, 2024, the Texas Second Court of Appeals reversed Mason's conviction and rendered a judgment of acquittal. The court held that the evidence was insufficient to establish that Mason knew she was ineligible to vote, an element required for a conviction under Texas law. The Tarrant County District Attorney's Office petitioned the Texas Court of Criminal Appeals to reverse the acquittal and reinstate Mason's conviction. On August 21, 2024, the Texas Court of Criminal Appeals agreed to review the case.

On September 24, 2026, the Texas Court of Criminal Appeals dismissed the State's petition for discretionary review after concluding that its decision to grant review had been "improvident", leaving the Second Court of Appeals' 2024 acquittal in place.

=== Sentencing comparisons ===
Mason's sentence of five years imprisonment drew comparisons with sentences imposed in other election-related cases in Texas. Mark Whittaker pleaded guilty to one count of illegal voting for voting in both Texas and Connecticut. He received a sentence of five years' probation, a $4,000 fine, and 100 hours of community service. Monica Mendez pleaded guilty to three counts of illegal voting for marking the ballots of three voters in a ballot-harvesting scheme. She was sentenced to five years of probation. Former Tarrant County Justice of the Peace Russ Casey pleaded guilty to tampering with a government record after submitting petitions containing forged signatures to qualify for the Republican primary ballot and received five years' probation. Mason's case differed from these cases in that she submitted a provisional ballot after a poll worker could not find her name on the voter rolls; the ballot was rejected and never counted.

== Response ==
Demonstrators protested against her sentencing on Labor Day in 2020, along with protesting the perceived lack of transparency about voting rights for convicted felons.

Mason's prosecution attracted criticism from civil-rights and voting-rights organizations. The ACLU of Texas, the Texas Civil Rights Project, the League of Women Voters of Texas, and a bipartisan group of former state and federal prosecutors represented by the States United Democracy Center filed amicus briefs supporting Mason's appeal.

In 2021, the Texas Legislature amended the illegal-voting statute to provide that a person could not be convicted solely because the person signed a provisional ballot, requiring additional evidence that the person knowingly attempted to cast an unlawful vote.

== Advocacy ==
After her conviction, Mason became involved in voting-rights advocacy. In 2020, she founded the organization Crystal Mason: The Fight Against Voter Suppression, which sought to educate people about voting eligibility and rights. In 2022, Mason was the keynote speaker at San Antonio's annual Martin Luther King Jr. March and related commemorative events, where she spoke about her prosecution and voting rights.
