= Charlotte Mason (disambiguation) =

Charlotte Mason (1842–1923) was a British educator.

Charlotte Mason may also refer to:

- Charlotte Mason (coach) (1945–2011), American basketball coach
- Charlotte Osgood Mason (1854–1946), American socialite
