= Gary Mason =

Gary Mason may refer to:

- Gary Mason (boxer) (1962–2011), British boxer
- Gary Mason (footballer) (born 1979), Scottish professional footballer
- Gary H. Mason, music producer, promoter and music video director
- Gary Mason (motorcyclist) (born 1979), British motorcycle road racer
- Gary Mason (journalist), Canadian journalist
