= Tim Mason =

Tim or Timothy Mason may refer to:

- Tim Mason (bowls) (born 1974), Canadian lawn bowler
- Tim Mason (cricketer) (born 1975), English cricketer
- Tim Mason (rugby union) (1923–1981), New Zealand rugby union player
- Timothy Mason (clockmaker) (1695–1734), English clockmaker
- Timothy Mason (historian) (1940–1990), British historian
- Timothy Mason (playwright) (1950-2023), American playwright
