= Albert Abraham Mason =

British anesthesiologist (1926–2018)

Dr. Albert Abraham Mason (1926 – 16 May 2018) was an anesthesiologist at Queen Victoria Hospital in East Grinstead, England who used hypnosis to treat pain and common ailments. He is known for his accidental treatment of epidermolytic hyperkeratosis through hypnosis. He reportedly stumbled upon this treatment in 1952.

== Publications ==
- Mason, Albert Abraham (1960). Hypnotism for Medical and Dental Practitioners. Secker & Warburg. OCLC 30252296.
