= Masuccio =

Masuccio is both a given name and a surname. Notable people with the name include:

- Masuccio Primo, Italian architect and sculptor of the 13th century
- Masuccio Salernitano, Italian poet
- Masuccio Segondo, Italian architect of the 14th century period
- Natale Masuccio, Italian architect and Jesuit

== See also ==
- Masucci
