= Maselli =

Maselli is a surname of Italian origin. Notable people with the surname include:

- Francesco Maselli (born 1930), Italian film director and screenwriter
- Domenico Maselli (1933–2016), Italian politician
- Claudio Maselli (born 1950), Italian footballer and manager
- Sergio Maselli (born 2001), Italian footballer
