= Masella (surname) =

Masella is a surname. Notable people with the surname include:

- Alfons Masella, Tongan rugby league footballer
- Benedetto Aloisi Masella (1879–1970), Italian Cardinal of the Roman Catholic Church
- Blanca Morales-Masella (born 1970), Guatemalan swimmer
- Gaetano Aloisi Masella (1826–1902), Italian Cardinal of the Roman Catholic Church
- Joseph Masella (c. 1948–1998), American mobster
- Joseph Masella (1925–1996), Canadian-French hornist and music educator
- Martin Masella (born 1969), Tongan rugby league footballer
- Tom Masella (born 1959), American football player and coach

== See also ==
- Masella, ski resort in La Cerdanya in Girona
