= Masetto =

Masetto can mean the following:

- Masetto, character in Don Giovanni
- Franco Masetto, Italian football player
