= Ken Mason (pathologist) =

British professor of forensic medicine (1919–2017)

Professor Ken Mason CBE FRCPath FRCPE FRSE

Regius Professor of Forensic Medicine, University of Edinburgh
- In office 1973–1985

Director, Department of Aviation and Forensic Pathology, Royal Air Force
- In office 1956–1973

Personal details
- Born: John Kenyon French Mason; 19 December 1919 Lahore
- Died: 26 January 2017 (aged 97)

John Kenyon French Mason (19 December 1919 – 26 January 2017), also known as J. Kenyon Mason, and Ken Mason, was a Royal Air Force medical officer (with the rank of group captain) who later became professor of forensic medicine at the University of Edinburgh School of Law.

== Early life ==
Mason was born in Lahore. He was educated at Downside School, then studied at Peterhouse college at University of Cambridge and gained a bachelor's degree in 1939. He went to London to continue with clinical training at St Bartholomew's Hospital and qualified as a doctor in 1942.

== Career ==
=== Aviation pathology ===
Mason completed his internship at Barts, then joined the Royal Air Force in 1943 and served as a medical officer with a fighter squadron with for the remainder of World War II. He was given a permanent commission after the war and was appointed a Specialist in Pathology in 1951. In 1955, the Royal Air Force (RAF) Department of Aviation Pathology with Mason leading this. He gained a MD in 1961 with his thesis titled Aviation pathology : a study of fatalities arising from military aviation in peacetime His book Aviation Accident Pathology: A Study of Fatalities was published in 1962, and was partly derived from his work while in charge of the institute. He was seconded to Armed Forces Institute of Pathology in Washington, D.C. and worked there 1963 to 1965. He was quoted as saying that the focus on pilot error, rather than other factors, "has put back crash investigation by a generation." He retired from the RAF in 1973 at the age of 53.

=== Regius Chair of Forensic Medicine ===
In March 1973, Mason was appointed to the Regius Chair of Forensic Medicine at the University of Edinburgh, to take up the post in August. His inaugural lecture was given on 28 February 1974 with the title Ambitions for a Motley Coat. In 1983, the first edition of Mason and Alexander McCall Smith's Law and Medical Ethics was published. After forty years the book was in its twelfth version.

=== Biomedical ethics ===
Mason had a "third career" as an expert in biomedical ethics and was an Honorary Fellow of the School of Law, in addition to being Regius Professor at the University of Edinburgh. In 1998 his book Medico-legal Aspects of Reproduction and Parenthood was published.

== Awards and honours ==
Mason received two awards for RAF personnel- L. G. Groves Memorial Prize for Aircraft Safety in 1957 and the R. F. Linton Prize for contributions to flight safety in 1959.

He was made Commander of the Order of the British Empire (CBE) as a RAF Group Captain in the 1973 Birthday Honours.

Mason was a beloved mentor, teacher, and scholar. He was honored with a festschrift in 2005 titled First Do No Harm, an acknowledgement by other academics that he had made a seminal contribution in the fields of medical law and biomedical ethics. After his death, his students and colleagues honored him with a special journal article of tributes in Medical Law Review.

He was elected as a Fellow of the Royal Society of Edinburgh in 1995.

In 2011 he was a runner-up for The Times/Sternberg Active Life Award.

== Bibliography ==
- J. Kenyon Mason, Graeme Laurie Law and Medical Ethics (Oxford University Press, 2013)
- J. Kenyon Mason Forensic Medicine for Lawyers (Butterworths, 2000)
- J. Kenyon Mason Medico-Legal Aspects of Reproduction and Parenthood (Ashgate, 1998)
- J. Kenyon Mason, Alexander McCall Smith Medico-legal Encyclopaedia (Butterworth Heinemann, 1987)
