= Medical Law Review =

- Discipline: Law
- Language: English

Publication details
- History: 1997-present
- Publisher: Oxford University Press
- Frequency: Quarterly

Standard abbreviations
- ISO 4: Med. Law Rev.

Indexing
- ISSN: 0967-0742

Links
- Journal homepage

Medical Law Review (ISSN 0967-0742) is published by Oxford University Press. It was first published in 1997 and publishes peer-reviewed scholarly articles, notes, reports, and book reviews. It is current edited by Hazel Biggs and Suzanne Ost. A ranking of UK law journals based on statistical data from the 2001 Research Assessment Exercise places the Medical Law Review as the leading medical law journal. It is widely regarded as a leading medical law journal.
