= Carlos H. Mason =

Furniture store operator in Atlanta (1873–1955)

Carlos Harris Mason (1873–1955) was one of Atlanta's first furniture store operators. He was president of Mason Furniture Company located at Whitehall and Mitchell Streets downtown. He was director of the First National Bank of Atlanta, and for 14 years was chairman of the Atlanta Police Board, including the period of the Atlanta Ripper murders.

Mason built his mansion in 1922 at what is now 1189 Ponce de Leon Avenue at the southeast corner of Moreland Avenue at the western edge of Druid Hills. It was later used as the headquarters for the Golden Key National Honor Society. It still stands, housing realtors' and attorneys' offices.
