= School of Economics, UNAM =

School of Economics (UNAM)
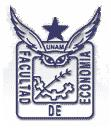
- Seal of UNAM's School of Economics
- Type: Faculty
- Established: 1929
- Director: Lorena Rodríguez León
- Students: 3.125
- Location: Mexico City, Mexico
- Colors: Black, red & gold
- Website: www.economia.unam.mx (in Spanish)

The School of Economics is the dependence of the National Autonomous University of Mexico responsible for conducting research and teaching in economics. Has its direct predecessor in the so-called National School of Economics.

== History ==
The National School of Economics was founded on February 10, 1929, when an economics section was established in the old National School of jurisprudence of the not yet Autonomous National University of Mexico. Since its beginning and up to 1934 it operated from the National School of Jurisprudence building. In 1935, when it became the National School of Economics moved to the annex building of the Jurisprudence school at México City's downtown.

Eventually, the National School of Economics began to occupy several buildings of the downtown area, the one it occupied the longest (from March 1938 to June 1954) was located at 92 Tacuba Street. In 1954 the National School of Economics finally moved to Ciudad Universitaria. In 1976 as an agreement of the university council, The National School of Economics transformed to a School that now includes graduate studies.
