= Sarah Mason =

Sarah Mason may refer to:

- Sarah Y. Mason (1896–1980), American screenwriter and script supervisor
- Sarah Mason (novelist) (born 1971), British romance novelist
- Sarah Mason (actress) (born 1983), American actress and former model
- Sarah Mason (surfer) (born 1995), New Zealand-born surfer
- Sarah Mason (Jericho character), a fictional character

== See also ==
- Sara Mason (disambiguation)
