= Arthur Mason (footballer) =

Australian rules footballer, born 1909

Personal information
- Full name: Arthur Mason
- Born: 22 August 1909
- Died: 17 November 1971 (aged 62)

Playing career^{1}
Years	Club	Games (Goals)
1929	North Melbourne	2 (1)
- ^{1} Playing statistics correct to the end of 1929.

Arthur Mason (22 August 1909 – 17 November 1971) was an Australian rules footballer who played for the North Melbourne Football Club in the Victorian Football League (VFL).
