= Roger Mason =

Roger Mason may refer to:

- Roger Mason (baseball) (born 1958), American baseball player
- Roger Mason (geologist) (born 1941), discoverer of Ediacaran fossils
- Roger Mason Jr. (born 1980), American basketball player
- Roger Mason (musician), Australian keyboardist
