= Diana Mason =

Diana Mason may refer to:

- Diana Mason (doctor) (1922–2007), New Zealand doctor
- Diana Mason (equestrian) (1933–2016), British Olympic equestrian
