= Helen Mason (endocrinologist) =

British endocrinologist

Helen Mason is a British endocrinologist who specialises in reproductive endocrinology and is deputy head of Biomedical Sciences at St. Georges (University of London). She graduated from Aston University and Imperial College London, and is now a director of PCOS UK, which provides support for health-care professionals dealing with polyendocrine metabolic ovarian syndrome, formerly polycystic ovary syndrome. She is a fellow of the Royal Society of Biology. Mason also specialized in reproductive functions of patients with eating disorder and has published several papers and contributed to a number of books on the subject.

== Positions ==
- Scientific advisor to the Polycystic ovary syndrome (PCOS) self-help group Verity
- Executive director of PCOS-UK
- Fellow of Royal Society of Biology
- Academic Director of Edulink Consultants Dubai

== Publications ==
- Mason HD, Willis DS, Beard RW, Winston RML, Margara R and Franks S (1994) Estradiol production by granulosa cells of normal and polycystic ovaries: relationship to menstrual cycle history and concentrations of gonadotrophins and sex steroids in follicular fluid. J Clin Endo Metab 79: 1355-1360.
- Pellatt L, Hanna L, Brincat M, Galea R, Brain H, Whitehead S, Mason HD (2007) Granulosa cell AMH production is increased in PCO. Journal of Clinical Endocrinology and Metabolism 92(1):240-245.
- PCOS Forum: research in polycystic ovary syndrome today and tomorrow. (2011) Pasquali R, Stener-Victorin E, Yildiz BO, Duleba AJ, Hoeger K, Mason H, Homburg R, Hickey T, Franks S, Tapanainen JS, Balen A, Abbott DH, Diamanti-Kandarakis E, Legro RS. Clin Endocrinol. 74(4):424-433.
- Michael AE, Clarke RJ, Collins TD, Gregory L, Glenn C, Wood PJ, Pugh E, Webb RJ, Pellatt L and Mason HD (2013) Ovarian 11β-Hydroxysteroid Dehydrogenase (11βHSD) activity is suppressed in women with anovulatory polycystic ovary syndrome (PCOS): apparent role for ovarian androgens. Journal of Clinical Endocrinology and Metabolism in press.
