= Alice Mason =

Alice Mason may refer to:

- Alice Mason (artist) (1904–1971)
- Alice Mason (runner) (born 1987)
- Alice Mason (real estate broker) (1923–2024)
