= Raymond Mason =

Raymond Mason may refer to:

- Raymond Mason (sculptor) (1922–2010)
- Raymond A. Mason (1936–2025), CEO of Legg Mason
- Raymond K. Mason (1927–2020), businessman
- Raymond Mason (actor), see The Kipper and the Corpse
