= Ken Mason (footballer) =

New Zealand footballer

Personal information
- Full name: Kenneth J Mason
- Place of birth: New Zealand
- Position: Outside left

Senior career*
Years	Team	Apps	(Gls)
- Metro College

International career
1947	New Zealand	4	(1)
- * Club domestic league appearances and goals

Ken Mason is a former association football player who represented New Zealand at international level.

Mason scored on his full All Whites debut in a 5–6 loss to South Africa on 28 June 1947 and ended his international playing career with four A-international caps and one goal to his credit, his final cap an appearance in a 1–4 loss to South Africa on 17 July 1947.
