= Hilda Mason (architect) =

British architect

St Andrews Church, Felixstowe
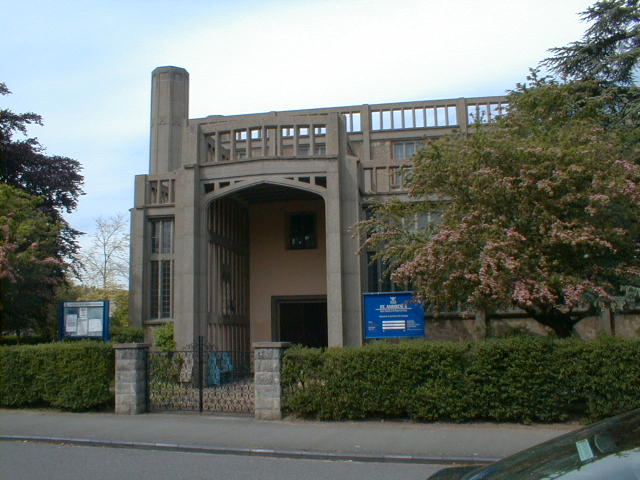
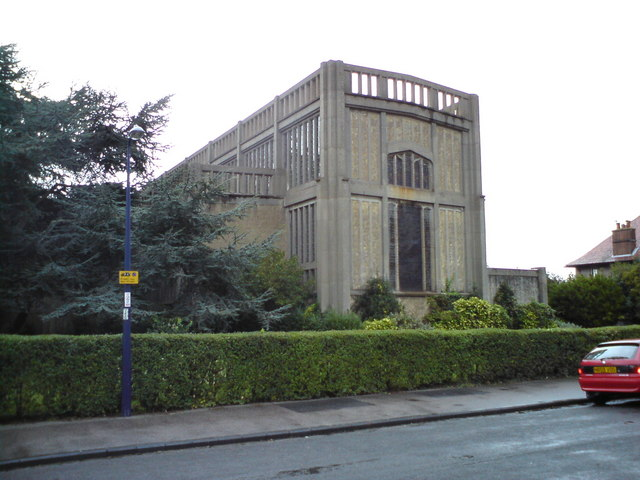

Hilda Frances Mason ARIBA (17 June 1879 – 1955) was an English architect.

She designed, with Raymond Erith, St Andrew's church, Felixstowe, in 1929–1930, the first church to be built in England using reinforced concrete. Since 10 February 1986, it has been a grade II* listed building. It has been described as "an intermingling of late-Gothic Suffolk wool-churches ... with the reinforced-concrete-and-glass language of Perret's Notre-Dame, Le Raincy". She also built a modernist home for herself, Kings Knoll, Woodbridge.

She also painted watercolours, exhibiting with the Ipswich Art Club.

She did not marry, and died in Ipswich aged 74.
