= Benjamin Mason =

Benjamin Mason may refer to:

== Mason family ==
- Benjamin Mason (born 1992) of the Mason family of American politicians
- Benjamin Mason (1826–1847) of the Mason family of American politicians
- Benjamin Mason (1865–1924) of the Mason family of American politicians

== Others ==
- Benjamin Franklin Mason (1804–1871), American artist
- Benjamin Mason (MP) (fl.1656), MP for Herefordshire
- Benjamin Mason (Merchant) Timber Merchant in Western Australia

== See also ==
- Ben Mason (disambiguation)
