= Steve Mason =

Steve, Stephen or Steven Mason may refer to:

- Steve Mason (poet) (1940–2005), American war veteran and poet
- Steve Mason (ice hockey) (born 1988), former ice hockey goaltender
- Steve Mason (musician) (born 1975), Scottish musician, King Biscuit Time as a solo artist, songwriter with The Beta Band
- Steve Mason (broadcaster) (born 1965), American sports radio personality based in Southern California
- Steve Mason (biblical scholar) (born 1957), Canadian biblical scholar

== Stephen ==
- Stephen Mason (musician) (born 1975), American guitarist from music group Jars of Clay
- Stephen Mason (MP) (1832–1890), Scottish Liberal politician
- Stephen Finney Mason (1923–2007), British chemist and scientific historian

== Fictional characters ==
- Steve Mason, character in the manga series Death Note, see list of Death Note characters

== See also ==
- Stevens Thomson Mason (senator) (1760–1803), American Revolutionary War colonel; U.S. Senator from Virginia.
- Stevens T. Mason (1811–1843), acting Territorial Governor of Michigan Territory; first Governor of State of Michigan.
