= Andrea Mason =

Andrea Mason may refer to:

- Andrea Mason (actress) (born 1968), British actress
- Andrea Mason (political candidate) (born 1968), Australian political candidate
