= Peter Mason =

Peter Mason may refer to:

- Sir Peter Mason (businessman) (1946–2024), English businessman
- Peter Mason (politician), leader of Ealing London Borough Council since 2021
- Peter Mason (physicist) (1922–1987), English-born Australian physicist
- Peter Mason (bishop) (born 1943), Anglican bishop of Ontario, Canada
- Peter Mason (journalist) (born 1963), English journalist and author

== See also ==
- Peter Mason Opie, folklorist
