= Tony Mason =

Tony Mason may refer to:

- Tony Mason (American football) (1928–1994), American football coach
- Tony Mason (co-driver), rally co-driver and presenter
- Tony Mason (RAF officer) (1932–2023), British air marshal
- Tony Mason, restaurateur best known for inventing the Lynchburg Lemonade

== See also ==
- Anthony Mason (disambiguation)
