= Martin Mason (pioneer) =

Surgeon, magistrate and commander and pioneer settler of Australia

Martin Mason (c. 1765–1812) was a surgeon, magistrate and commander who is notable as a pioneer settler of Australia, and also as a supporter of Captain Bligh following the 1808 Rebellion at Sydney, New South Wales.

== Early career ==
Martin Mason was born in Cumbria, England, possibly in the village of Moreland, and studied medicine at Greenwich Hospital near London. He sailed for Sydney as surgeon on Britannia, arriving on 18 July 1798. At this date, the colony of New South Wales was barely ten years old. Martin Mason rose to prominence in the early days of the colony, being appointed as Assistant Colonial Surgeon by Governor Philip Gidley King in 1801 and magistrate for the districts of Parramatta and Toongabbie in 1802. In 1802, Mason received a land grant of 300 acres from Governor King at Mulgrave Place in the Hawkesbury Settlement, making him one of the earliest colonists to develop land outside the new town of Sydney. At the end of 1803, he was discharged from his duties as Assistant Surgeon and opened the first medical practice in Australia at Green Hills (present day Windsor).

== First mutiny of Irish convicts ==
In 1800, a mutiny planned by Irish convicts, many of whom were political prisoners transported after the 1798 rebellion in Ireland, was thwarted by the New South Wales Corps, then headed by Lieutenant John Macarthur. Since the main revolt was to have taken place in the Hawkesbury district, Martin Mason was required to act as surgeon during the many floggings that subsequently took place.

== Coal River mutiny ==
In early 1802, Martin Mason was sent to the Coal River (present day Newcastle) in his capacity as magistrate to hold an inquiry into a convict mutiny that once again involved Irish political prisoners. The Coal River, like Port Macquarie, Moreton Bay and Norfolk Island, was being used for particularly difficult or potentially dangerous convicts. Mason remained there for three months until recalled by Governor King. During his time in command at Coal River, he instigated shaft mining, enabling more and better quality coal to be mined.

== Marsden v Mason ==
In the matter brought before Atkins J.A., on 14 February, 3 and 4 March 1806 of Rev. S. Marsden v. Martin Mason concerning a defamation, £50 is at issue. Mason pleaded not guilty. The transcript shows Marsden pursuing Mason, attempting character assassination, over his claim that during the night of the 1804 Castle Hill Rebellion that Marsden ran away, which was true. A letter written by Elizabeth Macarthur details the flight by long boat with her children from Parramatta on the Sunday night 4 March, under the 'protection' of the Rev. Marsden.

== Involvement in the Rum Rebellion ==
In 1808, the major event in Australian history known as the Rum Rebellion took place in New South Wales. As a result of growing friction between Governor William Bligh and officers of the New South Wales Corps, Bligh was deposed and ultimately forced to return to England to defend himself. Bligh owned a farm near Martin Mason in the Hawkesbury district and Mason and numerous other settlers lent their support to Bligh, incurring the wrath of Bligh's opponents, including wealthy landowner and former New South Wales Corps Lieutenant John Macarthur. In August 1810, Mason, having been deputized along with George Suttor to act on behalf of the settlers in the Hawkesbury district, sailed for London with Bligh on HMS Hindostan. The subsequent trial of the rebel officers, at which Mason was called upon to testify, resulted in Bligh being vindicated and charges brought against the main ringleaders, Major George Johnston and Lieutenant Colonel Joseph Foveaux.

== Mason's disappearance ==
In August 1811, passage was booked for Mason's return to Sydney aboard Mary. The ship subsequently sailed from Portsmouth on 20 November 1811 and arrived in Sydney in May 1812 carrying a number of those who had gone to London to give evidence in the Bligh trial, including George Suttor. Martin Mason was not on board and was not seen by his family again. This led members of the Bligh party to believe that he had been murdered prior to boarding Mary in London. No other explanation has ever been found.
