= Scott Mason =

Scott Mason is the name of:

- Scott Mason (cricketer) (1976–2005), Australian cricketer
- Scott Mason (radio personality) (1959–2015), American radio personality
- Scott Mason (Big Brother), contestant on Big Brother
- Scott Mason (journalist), WRAL-TV reporter and host of Tar Heel Traveler
