= Shirley Mason =

Shirley Mason may refer to:

- Shirley Ardell Mason (1923–1998), American psychiatric patient
- Shirley Mason (actress) (1900–1979), American silent film actress

== See also ==
- Shirley Manson (born 1966), Scottish musician and actress
