= Leonard Edward Mason =

American anthropologist

Leonard Edward Mason (1913-2005) was an American professor of anthropology at University of Hawaii at Manoa specializing in Pacific Islands of Micronesia.

He was an Honorary Fellow of the Association for Social Anthropology in Oceania.

He died in 2005.

== Publications ==
- The economic organization of the Marshall Islanders, In US Commercial Company’s Economic Survey of Micronesia, Report no. . Honolulu: US Commercial Company 1946 (online).
- Anthropology-geography study of Arno Atoll, Marshall Islands, Atoll Research Bulletin no. 10. Washington, D.C.: The Smithsonian Institution 1952.
- Relocation of the Bikini Marshallese: a study in group migration, PhD dissertation, Yale University 1954.
