= Edward Mason =

Edward Mason may refer to:

- Edward E. Mason (1912–1971), American surgeon
- Edward G. Mason (1839–1898), American lawyer, historian, writer
- Edward J. Mason (1912–1971), British scriptwriter
- Edward J. Mason (politician) (1930–2020), Maryland state senator
- Edward Haven Mason (1849–1917), philatelist
- Edward S. Mason (1899–1992), American economist

== See also ==
- Edward Masen, Twilight character
