= Robert L. Mason =

American wrestler and coach

Robert L. Mason was an athlete, coach and official from Burns, Wyoming, who was inducted into the Washington Wrestling Hall of Fame in 1996. He died on March 18, 2000, at the age of 70.
