= Bertha Mason (disambiguation) =

Bertha Mason is a character from the novel Jane Eyre.

Bertha Mason may also refer to:

- Bertha Mason (suffragist) (1855–1939), English suffragist
- Bertha Betsey Mason (1872–1937), English businesswoman
