= Keith Mason =

Keith Mason may refer to:

- Keith Mason (judge) (born 1947), judge in New South Wales, Australia
- Keith Mason (rugby league) (born 1982), English born professional rugby league footballer
- Keith Mason (scientist) (born 1951), chief executive of the Science and Technology Facilities Council
- Keith Mason (activist), founder of Personhood USA
- Keith Mason (footballer) (born 1958), former professional footballer
- Keith Antar Mason (born 1956), American writer, performance artist, and playwright
