= President Mason =

President Mason may refer to:

== Politicians ==
- Sandra Mason (born 1949), first president of Barbados

== Businesspeople ==
- Harvey Mason Jr., president of the Recording Academy
- John Mason (businessman), second president of Chemical Bank
- Raymond A. Mason, president of Legg Mason

== Educators ==
- Max Mason, president of the University of Chicago and the Rockefeller Foundation
- Tisa Mason, president of Fort Hays State University
