= Ben Mason =

Ben Mason may refer to:

- Ben Mason (American football) (born 1999), NFL fullback
- Ben Mason (golfer) (born 1977), English professional golfer
- Ben Mason, see List of Falling Skies characters
- Ben Mason, musician in The Smallgoods

== See also ==
- Benjamin Mason (disambiguation)
