= Anthony Mason =

Anthony Mason may refer to:

- Anthony Mason (basketball) (1966–2015), American basketball player
- Anthony Mason Jr. (born 1987), his son, American basketball player
- Sir Anthony Mason (judge) (1925–2026), Chief Justice of Australia
- Anthony Mason (journalist) (born 1956), news correspondent and anchor

== See also ==
- Tony Mason (disambiguation)
