= Caroline Atwater Mason =

American novelist and travel writer

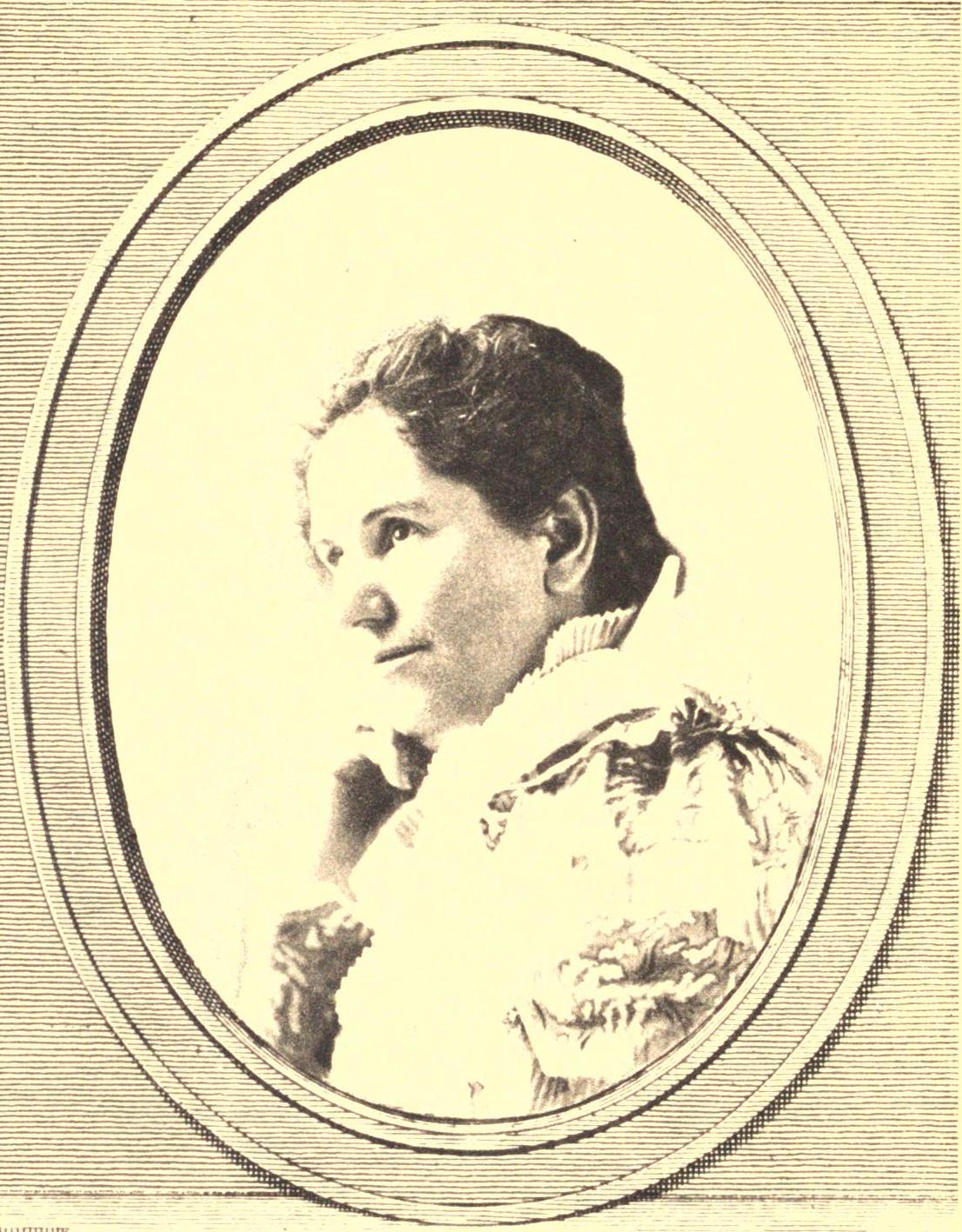
- Mason circa 1898
- Born: July 19, 1853; Providence
- Died: May 2, 1939 (aged 85); Danvers

Caroline Atwater Mason (July 10, 1853 – May 2, 1939) was an American novelist and travel writer.

== Life ==
Caroline Atwater was born on July 10, 1853, in Providence, Rhode Island, to Mary Weaver and Stephen Atwater. She was educated at the Friends Boarding School in Providence and studied in Germany for one year. On May 29, 1877, she married John H. Mason, a clergyman who taught at Rochester Theological Seminary.

She conducted research at the British Museum Reading Room and the Royal Library of the Netherlands.

Mason opposed suffrage for women and was a member of the National Association Opposed to Woman Suffrage.

She died on May 2, 1939, in Danvers, Massachusetts.

== Work ==
A Lily of France (1901), described as Mason's "best known story", is a historical novel about Charlotte of Bourbon and William the Silent set largely in a 16th-century convent. A review in the Chicago Tribune described it as a "sweet love story" with themes of religious liberty. Holt of Heathfield (1904) is "a quiet recital of a young minister's life in a factory town".

The Binding of the Strong (1909) is a love story based the romance of a woman of the last name Davis (whose first name is apparently lost to history) and John Milton. The Spell of Italy (1910) is a lightly fictionalized account of travels throughout Italy. The Spell of France (1912) is a similar travel narrative about France.

== Publications ==
- A Loyal Heart (1892)
- A Minister of the World (1895)
- A Minister of Carthage (1899)
- A Woman of Yesterday (1900)
- A Wind Flower
- The Quiet King
- A Lily of France (1901)
- The Little Green God (1902)
- Lux Christi - An Outline Study of India, A Twilight Land (1902)
- Holt of Heathfield (1904)
- Waxwing (1905)
- The Mystery of Miss Motte (1908)
- The Binding of the Strong (1909)
- The Spell of Italy (1910)
- The Spell of France (1912)
- Conscripts of Conscience (1919)
- Royton Manor (1928)
- Challenged (1931)
