= Masetti =

Masetti may refer to:

- Augusto Masetti (1888–1966), Italian anarchist
- Enzo Masetti (1893–1961), Italian composer
- Giulio Masetti (1895–1926), Italian race driver
- Guido Masetti (1907–1993), Italian footballer
- Masonwabe Maseti (born 1987), South African footballer
- Umberto Masetti (1926–2006), Italian motorcycle racer
- Masetti (born 1990), American/Italian singer/songwriter
