= Bobby Joe Mason =

American basketball player

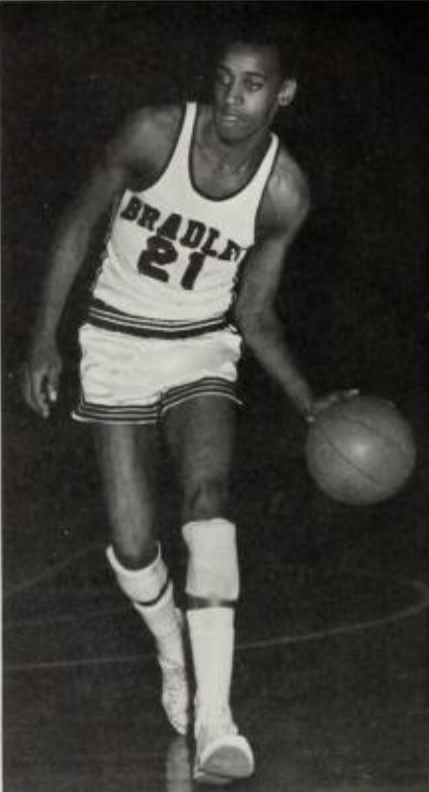
- Mason from the 1958 Anaga

Personal information
- Born: April 23, 1936 Centralia, Illinois, U.S.
- Died: July 4, 2006 (aged 70) Springfield, Illinois, U.S.
- Listed height: 6 ft 2 in (1.88 m)
- Listed weight: 165 lb (75 kg)

Career information
- High school: Centralia (Centralia, Illinois)
- College: Bradley (1956–1960)
- NBA draft: 1960: 6th round, 41st overall pick
- Drafted by: Cincinnati Royals
- Playing career: 1962–1974
- Position: Shooting guard / small forward

Career history
- 1962–1974: Harlem Globetrotters

Career highlights
- Second-team All-American – NABC (1960); First-team All-MVC (1959)
- Stats at Basketball Reference

Bobby Joe Mason (April 23, 1936 – July 4, 2006) was an American basketball player. He was an All-American college player at Bradley University and gained worldwide fame as a member of the Harlem Globetrotters.

== Career ==
Mason was a three-sport star at Centralia High School in Centralia, Illinois. He came to Bradley and, after losing nearly a season to academic eligibility issues, became a prominent player and a part of two National Invitation Tournament championships with the Braves. In 1958, he was named second-team All-Missouri Valley Conference, and was named to the first-team in 1959. Following the season, he was drafted by the National Basketball Association's Minneapolis Lakers, but chose to return to Bradley to use the rest of his eligibility.

Mason played 18 games for the Braves in 1959–60, until his eligibility ran out upon graduation. He left the team prior to their run to the 1960 NIT championship. Despite his abbreviated season, Mason was named a second-team All-American by the National Association of Basketball Coaches alongside teammate Chet Walker.

He was again drafted in the 1960 NBA draft, this time by the Cincinnati Royals (sixth round, 41st pick), however he did not play in the NBA. He instead joined the Harlem Globetrotters, playing for the touring team from 1962 to 1974. In addition to earning captain honors, he was a cast member on the 1974 Saturday morning television series The Harlem Globetrotters Popcorn Machine.

== Death ==
Mason died on July 4, 2006, at 70.
