= Fred Mason =

English footballer

Frederick Oliver Mason (1 August 1901 – after 1930) was an English footballer born in Solihull, now in the West Midlands. He played as a full back in the Football League for Cardiff City, Rochdale and Merthyr Town, and then moved to Ireland where he played for Dundalk and Derry City.
