= Frances Mason =

British musician

- Origin: United Kingdom
- Genres: Classical
- Occupations: Performer, teacher
- Instrument: Violin

Frances Mason is a British classical violinist, whose main interest is in chamber music but who has also performed as a soloist.

While a child, she studied with violinist Albert Sammons. She subsequently studied under Alan Loveday at the Royal College of Music, London. While there, she was awarded the Violin Prize and both the Tagore and the Worshipful Company of Musicians Medals. Later, she won awards in the Carl Flesch International Violin Competition and in the BBC Violin Competition, and won the National Federation of Music Societies Award for Young Concert Artists.

She has appeared as soloist four times in the BBC Promenade Concerts ("The Proms"), 1965–68.

She has played in the Zorian String Quartet, the Julian Bream Consort, and the Dartington Piano Trio. She has been leader of the Music Group of London, of the Rasumovsky String Quartet, and of the Tagore String Trio.

She has made several recordings, both under her own name and as part of an ensemble.

She has taught at the Royal College of Music, where she holds the title of professor.
