= USS Charlie B. Mason =

Patrol vessel of the United States Navy

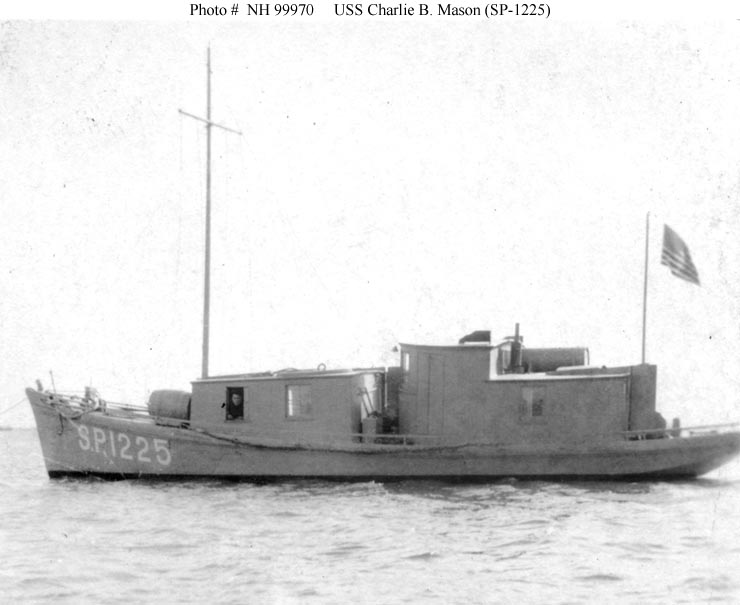
- USS Charlie B. Mason (SP-1225) sometime in 1917 or 1918.

History

United States
- Name: USS Charlie B. Mason
- Namesake: Previous name retained
- Completed: 1900
- Acquired: 1 June 1917
- Commissioned: 1 June 1917
- Decommissioned: 21 December 1918
- Fate: Returned to owner 21 December 1918
- Notes: Operated as private motorboat Charlie B. Mason 1900-1917 and from 1918

General characteristics
- Type: Patrol vessel
- Length: 45 ft (14 m)

USS Charlie B. Mason (SP-1225), frequently but apparently incorrectly referred to as Charles B. Mason, was a United States Navy patrol vessel in commission from 1917 to 1918.

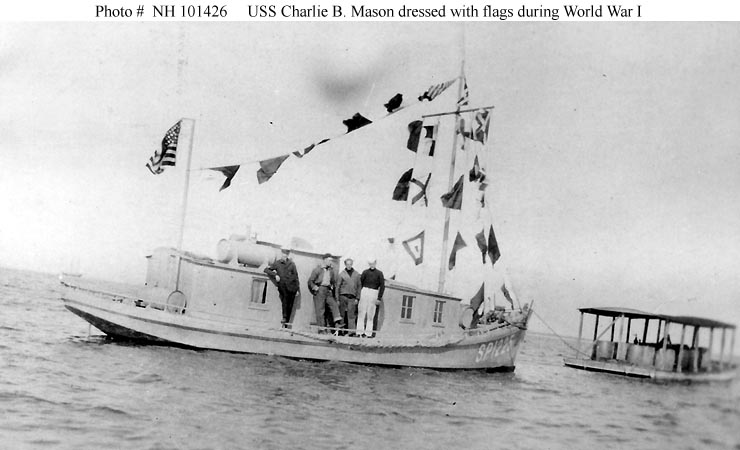
Charlie B. Mason (SP-1225) dressed with flags.

Charlie B. Mason was a motorboat built in 1900 at Hopkins, Virginia, probably for use as a commercial fishing boat. On 1 June 1917, the U.S. Navy chartered her from her owner, John K. Colona of Chincoteague, Virginia, for use as a section patrol boat during World War I. She was commissioned the same day as USS Charlie B. Mason (SP-1225).

Assigned to the 5th Naval District, Charlie B. Mason operated on patrol duty for the rest of World War I. She was decommissioned on 21 December 1918 and returned to Colona the same day.
