= Michelle Mason =

Michelle Mason Bizri is an associate professor of philosophy at the University of Minnesota, where she has taught since 2000. She has published numerous works in normative moral psychology, where her main contributions have been to defend the view that particular person-focused, esteem-based attitudes have a significant role to play in moral evaluation.

== Education and career ==
Mason Bizri received her Ph.D. in philosophy from the University of Chicago in 2001. Her doctoral thesis was entitled Moral Virtue and Reasons for Action. Before receiving her doctorate, Mason Bizri accepted an assistant professorship at the University of Minnesota. In 2002–2003, she accepted a position as faculty fellow in Harvard University's Program in Ethics and the Professions. She was named McKnight Land-Grant Professor for 2005–2007 and promoted to associate professor in 2007. In 2013, she became associate editor at Ethics. In 2015, she began a recurring visiting professorship at Brown University.

== Research areas ==
Mason Bizri's work has focused on ethics and moral psychology, with a special interest in the so-called reactive attitudes and how modern philosophical commitments in normative ethical theory constrain the class of morally justifiable reactive attitudes. Notably, she has defended the view that attitudes such as properly focused shame and contempt (as well as moralized forms of pride and love) should be included in the latter class.
