= Dick Mason =

New Zealand cricketer (1881–1936)

- Auckland in January 1904, Mason on ground at left

Personal information
- Full name: Frederick Richard Mason
- Born: 4 February 1881; Napier, New Zealand
- Died: 11 May 1936 (aged 55); Auckland, New Zealand
- Batting: Right-handed

Domestic team information
- Years: Team
- 1902/03–1914/15: Auckland

Career statistics
Competition	First-class
Matches	19
Runs scored	520
Batting average	16.77
100s/50s	0/1
Top score	81
Balls bowled	432
Wickets	2
Bowling average	112.50
5 wickets in innings	0
10 wickets in match	0
Best bowling	1/23
Catches/stumpings	14/–
- Source: Cricinfo, 27 November 2020

Frederick Richard Mason (4 February 1881 – 11 May 1936) was a New Zealand cricketer. He played 17 first-class matches for Auckland between 1902 and 1915, and represented New Zealand twice in 1904–05.

== Life and career ==
Mason was born in Napier and studied at Giles' Business College in Auckland before becoming an accountant.

Mason was a right-handed batsman who usually batted in the middle order. He was described later as "one of the most attractive batsmen in the Auckland side, when he got going". His highest first-class score was 81 on New Year's Day 1915, in his final match.

Mason made his first-class cricket debut for Auckland against Lord Hawke's team in 1902–03, scoring 26 in the first innings, which was Auckland's highest score in the match. When the Australian team toured in 1904–05, Mason made 79 against them out of Auckland's first-innings total of 175. He was selected for the two unofficial Test matches that followed shortly afterwards, but was not successful. He was also prominent in two Auckland victories in 1911–12; in the second match he took part in an unbroken tenth-wicket partnership of 35 that took Auckland to victory over Wellington.

Mason also represented Auckland at hockey between 1904 and 1912, captaining the team in 1911 and 1912. The hockey reporter for the Auckland Observer described him in 1910 as "the finest centre forward in the Dominion".

Mason died in Auckland Hospital in May 1936 after a long illness, aged 55. He left a widow and a son.
