= Maso =

Maso may refer to:

- Maso (goddess)
- Maso (spider), a genus of spiders in the family Linyphiidae
- La Masó, municipality in Spain
- Bartolomé Masó, Cuba, a municipality
- An informal term to describe Macedonia

== People with the given name ==
- Maso di Banco (died 1348), Italian painter
- Maso da San Friano (1536–1571), Italian painter
- Maso Finiguerra (1426–1464), Italian goldsmith, draftsman, and engraver

== People with the surname ==
- Bartolomé Masó (1830–1907), Cuban patriot
- Carole Maso, American author
- Jo Maso (born 1944), French former rugby footballer
- Pedro Masó (1927–2008), Spanish director, producer, and scriptwriter
- Rafael Masó (1880–1935), Catalan architect
- Yamazaki Maso (born 1966), Japanese noisician & performer
