= Ralph L. Mason =

American politician (c. 1896–1977)

Member of the Maryland Senate from the Worcester County district
- In office June 23, 1952 – 1958
- Preceded by: John O. Byrd
- Succeeded by: John L. Sanford

Personal details
- Born: Ralph Leonard Mason Newark, Maryland, U.S.
- Died: October 28, 1977 (aged 81) Salisbury, Maryland, U.S.
- Party: Democratic
- Spouse: Dorothy Gibson
- Children: 2
- Occupation: Politician; bank president

Ralph Leonard Mason (c. 1896 – October 28, 1977) was an American politician from Maryland. He served as a member of the Maryland Senate from 1952 to 1958.

== Early life ==
Ralph Leonard Mason was born in Newark, Maryland, to Julia (née Ross) and John L. Mason. He graduated from Beacom Business College.

== Career ==
Mason became director of the Home Bank of Newark in 1928. He was president of the bank from 1933 to his death. Mason worked in canning, poultry and the farming industry.

Mason was appointed to the Maryland Senate on June 23, 1952, to fill the vacancy following the death of John O. Byrd. He was a Democrat and represented Worcester County in the senate until 1958. He was president pro tempore from 1956 to 1958.

== Personal life ==
Mason married Dorothy Gibson. They had two sons, Thomas G. and Ralph L. Jr. He was a member of Trinity United Methodist Church.

Mason died on October 28, 1977, aged 81, at Peninsula General Hospital Medical Center in Salisbury.
