= Norm Mason =

Australian rules footballer

Personal information
- Full name: Norman Percy Mason
- Born: 15 October 1914; Finley, New South Wales
- Died: 17 November 1996 (aged 82); Preston, Victoria
- Height: 185 cm (6 ft 1 in)
- Weight: 81 kg (179 lb)

Playing career^{1}
Years	Club	Games (Goals)
1938	South Melbourne	2 (0)
- ^{1} Playing statistics correct to the end of 1938.

Norman Percy Mason (15 October 1914 – 17 November 1996) was an Australian rules footballer who played with South Melbourne in the Victorian Football League (VFL).

He later served in the Australian Army for six months in World War II.
