= Frank Mason =

Frank Mason may refer to:

== Sports ==
- Frank Mason III (born 1994), American basketball player
- Frank Mason (cricketer) (1926-2012), West Indian cricketer
- Frank A. Mason (1862–1940), American football coach and attorney
- Frank Mason (jockey) (1879–1969), English horse racing jockey

== Others ==
- Frank Mason or Algis Budrys (1931–2008), Lithuanian-American science-fiction author
- Frank Henry Mason (1875–1965), English painter
- Frank Herbert Mason (1921–2009), American painter
