= Pat Mason =

American baseball player and coach

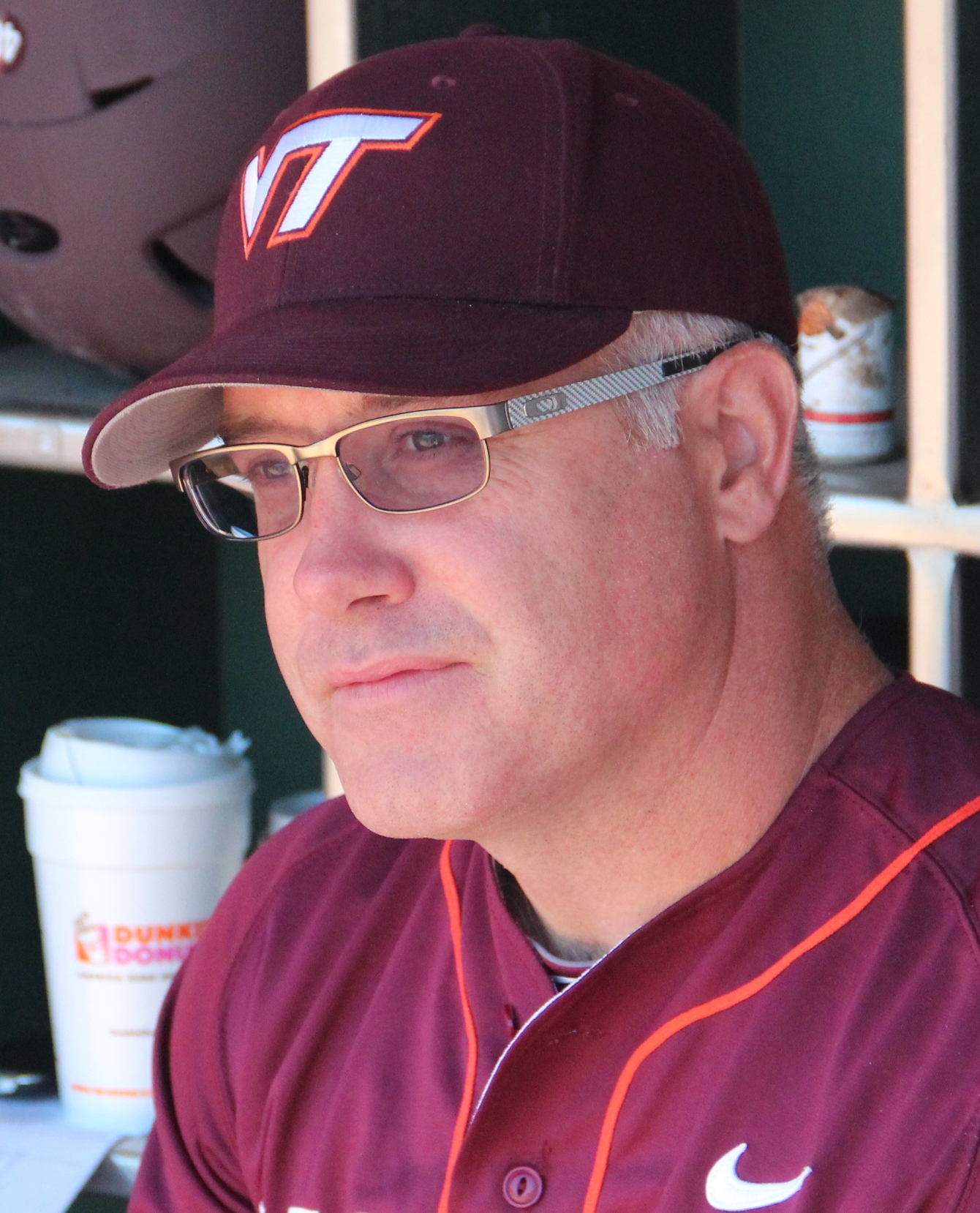
- Mason in 2014

Playing career
- 1994–1997: Northeastern
- Position: Catcher

Coaching career (HC unless noted)
- 2000–2003: Boston College (asst.)
- 2004: Framingham State (asst.)
- 2005–2010: Northeastern (asst.)
- 2011–2013: Virginia Tech (asst.)
- 2014–2017: Virginia Tech
- 2018–2019: Northeastern (volunteer asst.)

Head coaching record
- Overall: 90–126–1 (.417)

Patrick Mason was an American college baseball coach and former catcher. He was the volunteer assistant coach at Northeastern University. Mason played college baseball at Northeastern University for coach Neil McPhee from 1994 to 1997 and played in the Heartland League for one season in 1997. He served as the head coach at Virginia Tech from 2014–2017. Mason was a catcher for Northeastern for four years, before a brief minor league career. He helped lead the Huskies to a pair of conference titles in 1994 and 1997. He then earned an assistant coaching position at Boston College, his first position under Pete Hughes. After four season with the Eagles, he spent one year at Framingham State before returning to his alma mater for six seasons. Mason was reunited with Hughes at Virginia Tech in 2011, earning the associate head coach position in 2012. Following Hughes' departure for Oklahoma following the Hokies' first-ever selection as a regional host in 2013, Mason was promoted to head coach. After a 90–126–1 record in 4 season at Virginia Tech, Mason was fired.

On September 25, 2017, Mason returned to Northeastern as a volunteer assistant coach.

== Head coaching record ==
The following is a table of Mason's yearly records as an NCAA head baseball coach.

Record table
Season	Team	Overall	Conference	Standing	Postseason
Virginia Tech Hokies (Atlantic Coast Conference) (2014–2017)
2014	Virginia Tech	21–31	9–21	7th (Coastal)	
2015	Virginia Tech	27–27	13–16	T-3rd (Coastal)	
2016	Virginia Tech	19–36	6–24	7th (Coastal)	
2017	Virginia Tech	23–32	9–21	T-6th (Coastal)	
Virginia Tech:		90–126–1	37–82		
Total:		90–126–1			
National champion Postseason invitational champion Conference regular season champion Conference regular season and conference tournament champion Division regular season champion Division regular season and conference tournament champion Conference tournament champion

== See also ==
- Career statistics from Baseball Reference (Minors)
