= Newton E. Mason =

United States Navy admiral

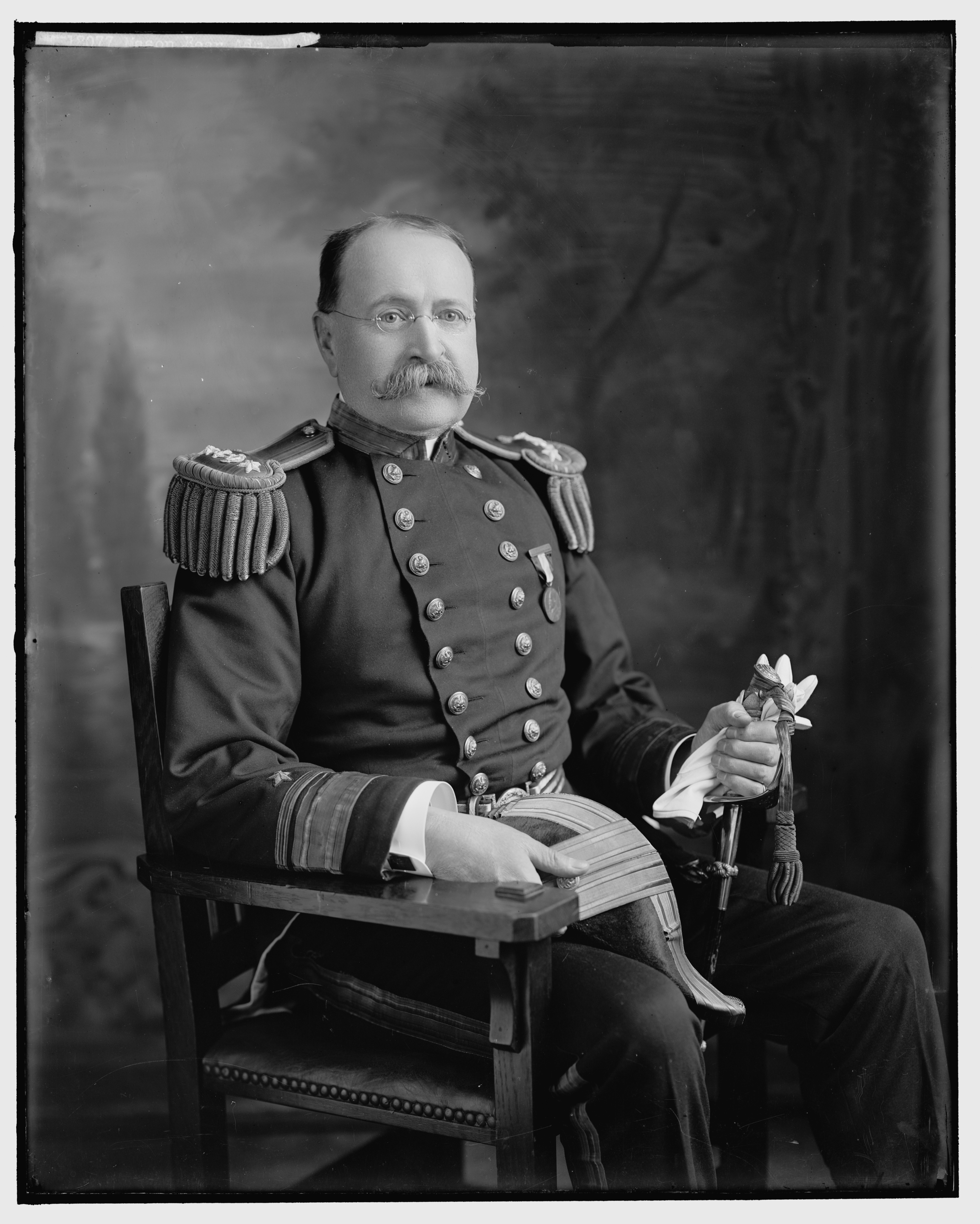
- Born: 14 October 1850; Monroeton, Pennsylvania, U.S.
- Died: 23 January 1945 (aged 94); Coronado, California, U.S.
- Burial place: Arlington National Cemetery
- Military career
- Allegiance: United States
- Branch: United States Navy
- Service years: 1869–1912; 1917–1918
- Rank: Rear Admiral
- Commands: USS Cincinnati
- Conflicts: Spanish–American War; Battle of Santiago de Cuba; World War I

Rear Admiral Newton Eliphalet Mason (14 October 1850 – 23 January 1945) was a United States Navy officer. His career included combat in the Spanish–American War and service during World War I, significant experience in ordnance duty, and a very long tour as Chief of the Bureau of Ordnance.

== Early life ==
Mason was born in Monroeton, Pennsylvania, on 14 October 1850, the son of Gordon Fowler Mason and Mary Anne Mason, and was educated at the Susquehanna Collegiate Institute in Towanda, Pennsylvania. He entered the United States Naval Academy at Annapolis, Maryland, on 24 July 1865.

== Naval career ==
Mason graduated from the Naval Academy in June 1869. His first assignment was aboard the sailing frigate USS Sabine for a special cruise from 1869 to 1870, and he was promoted to ensign on 12 July 1870. He underwent torpedo instruction in 1871, was promoted to master on 12 July 1871 or in 1872 (sources vary), and served aboard the screw frigate USS Wabash in the European Squadron from 1871 to 1872.

From 1873 to 1877, Mason served in the North Atlantic Squadron, first aboard the monitor USS Manhattan in 1873, then aboard the gunboat USS Kansas from 1874 to 1875, the monitor USS Catskill from 1875 to 1876, and the screw sloop-of-war USS Ossipee from 1876 to 1877, and he was promoted to lieutenant on 8 November 1874. He was aboard the receiving ship USS St. Louis at League Island in Philadelphia, Pennsylvania, from 1878 to 1880 and participated in the stormy and very difficult 27 March-20 May 1880 voyage of the sailing sloop-of-war USS Constellation to Ireland to transport relief supplies in the wake of the 1879 famine there. He then had duty in the Asiatic Squadron from 1880 to 1884, first aboard the sidewheel gunboat USS Monocacy from 1880 to 1883, then on the screw steamer USS Pensacola from 1883 to 1884.

Returning to the United States, Mason had ordnance duty in Washington, D.C., from 1884 to 1889, first at the Washington Navy Yard from 1884 to 1885 and then at the Bureau of Ordnance from 1885 to 1889. While at the bureau, he assisted in designing the first gun turret mounts and ammunition hoists ever used in the U.S. Navy, which were installed aboard the monitor USS Miantonomoh.

More duty in the North Atlantic Squadron followed, first aboard the gunboat USS Petrel from 1889 to October 1891, then on the monitor USS Miantonomoh from October 1891 to November 1892. Mason then returned to the Bureau of Ordnance for duty from November 1892 to June 1893, followed by a tour as Inspector of Ordnance, overseeing the Naval Ordnance Proving Grounds at Indian Head, Maryland, from June 1893 to 1896. He was promoted to lieutenant commander on 10 November 1896.

In November 1896, Mason reported to the new armored cruiser USS Brooklyn, in time for her commissioning on 1 December 1896, and saw action aboard her off Cuba during the Spanish–American War in 1898, including the Battle of Santiago de Cuba on 3 July 1898. Leaving Brooklyn in February 1899, he was the Inspector of Ordnance at League Island Navy Yard in Philadelphia from February to October 1899, then served as Inspector of Ordnance at the Naval Torpedo Station at Newport, Rhode Island, beginning on 6 October 1899. He was promoted to commander on 2 November 1899.

Mason's tour at the torpedo station ended in July 1902, and on 16 September 1902 he became commanding officer of the protected cruiser USS Cincinnati in the North Atlantic Fleet. During his tour, Cincinnati took the place of a battleship in the battleline during drills, then steamed across the Mediterranean Sea to transfer to the Asiatic Squadron, where she became part of a cruiser squadron.

Mason left Cincinnati in April 1904 and on 1 August 1904 began a lengthy tour as Chief of the Bureau of Ordnance which lasted until 31 May 1911, During the tour je was promoted to captain on 30 September 1904 and to rear admiral on 12 November 1908. On 27 February 1908, he testified before the United States Senate about alleged structural defects in U.S. Navy battleships. He became a member of the General Board of the United States Navy on 25 May 1911, and remained on the board until his retirement.

Mason retired from the Navy upon reaching the mandatory retirement age of 62 on 14 October 1912.

During the 1917-1918 participation of the United States in World War I, Mason was recalled to active duty to serve on the War Industries Board. While on this duty, he was the ordnance member of the Priorities Committee, which was created on 14 May 1917 and charged with deconflicting delivery priorities for the General Munitions Board of the Council of National Defense.

== Personal life ==
Mason married the former Isadora "Dora" Edmonia Hancock (16 October 1870 – 6 January 1927) on 4 April 1894. They had at least one son, Gorden Hancock Mason (14 December 1896 – 4 December 1918), who became a Navy officer.

Mason was a member of the Army and Navy Club of Washington, D.C., the Sons of the American Revolution, and the Pennsylvania Commandery of the Military Order of Foreign Wars.

== Death ==
Mason died on 23 January 1945 in Coronado, California, and is buried with his wife and son at Arlington National Cemetery in Arlington, Virginia.

== Gallery ==
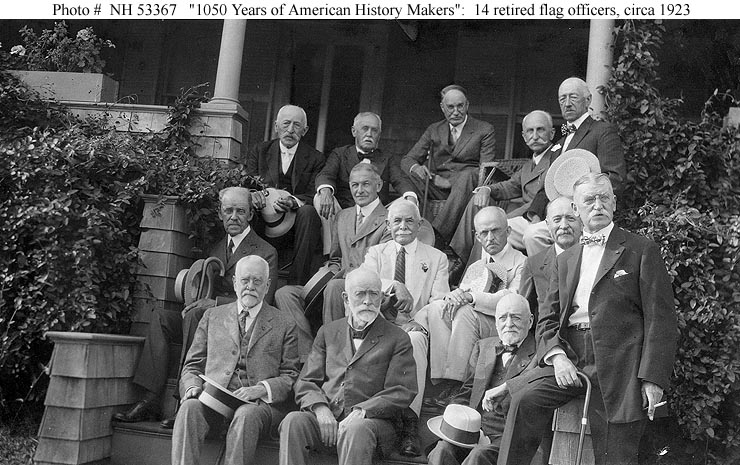
Mason is farthest right in the middle row of this photograph of retired flag officers, ca. 1923.
