= Beth Mason =

American politician in New Jersey (b.1960)

Personal details
- Born: Elizabeth Abruzese; October 20, 1960 (age 65) Richmond, Virginia, U.S.
- Party: Democratic
- Spouse: Richard Mason
- Education: Virginia Commonwealth; University

Elizabeth Abruzese Mason (born c. 1960) is an American politician, management consultant, and advocate for open government in New Jersey. A member of the Democratic Party, she served as Second Ward Councilwoman and City Council President in Hoboken, New Jersey from 2007 until 2015.

== Early life and education ==
Born Elizabeth Abruzese, she grew up in Richmond, Virginia, and was raised Catholic. One of her parents worked as a computer programmer, while the other worked as a secretary. She attended Virginia Commonwealth University, where she served as student body president. At the age of 19, she converted to Judaism. In 1983 or 1984, she moved with her husband Ricky Mason to Hoboken, New Jersey.

== Business career ==
Mason worked in an advertising agency, where she helped to launch the Trivial Pursuit board game and the Sci Fi Channel (now called Syfy). She then worked as a management consultant specializing in change management, with clients such as MCI/WorldCom, St. Luke's-Roosevelt Hospital, and the New York City public school system under Mayor Michael Bloomberg.

== Political career ==
Mason was appointed to the Hoboken Planning Board by Mayor David Roberts in 2001. In January 2003, she resigned from the position, citing the mayor's "unfulfilled promises" and his reappointment of a board member who voted in favor of a project opposed by his administration. She proceeded to run her first campaign for the Hoboken City Council, as part of the Hoboken Alliance for Accountability in Government, but was defeated in a run-off election in June 2003 by incumbent Second Ward councilman Richard DelBoccio.

=== Lawsuits under the Open Public Records Act ===
In March 2004, Mason filed the first of eight lawsuits she filed against the city of Hoboken before she was elected to the City Council in May 2007. In October 2004, Mason was elected president of the New Jersey Foundation for Open Government, an advocacy group. In February 2008, she told The New York Times that the lawsuits were intended to uncover how Hoboken was spending its $79 million budget. According to the city's legal counsel, over a 12-month period, Mason had made at least 125 requests for records under the New Jersey Open Public Records Act, costing the city $200,000 in legal fees.

Both the American Civil Liberties Union and the New Jersey Press Association had filed briefs on her behalf, and as of February 2008, she had won two of the eight cases, while settling some of the others; she continued to press the cases even after she was elected. In one case, Mason successfully sued the city to lower the price it charged for using its copy machines from 16 cents per page down to 7 cents; in another, the school board acknowledged that it had violated both the Open Records and the Open Public Meeting Acts. At the time, even Mayor Roberts conceded that her lawsuits had had some positive impact, by encouraging transparency in government. In July 2008, Mason won a lawsuit in State Superior Court, which ruled that the Hoboken Municipal Hospital Authority had failed to properly advertise meetings and disclose documents related to its purchase of St. Mary Hospital.

=== Campaign for mayor ===
Mason ran for Hoboken Mayor in 2009, finishing in third place. The top two candidates Peter Cammarano and Dawn Zimmer faced off in a runoff election. Mason endorsed Zimmer, but Cammarano prevailed in a tight race, winning with just 161 votes.

After Cammarano was arrested by the FBI as part of a major corruption and international money laundering conspiracy probe known as Operation Bid Rig, Mason again faced Zimmer in the special election, along with five other opponents: businessman Frank Raia, former Hoboken Municipal Court Judge Kimberly Glatt, Hoboken Republican Club co-founder Nathan Brinkman, management consultant Everton A. Wilson, and former corrections officer Patricia Waiters. Zimmer won with 43% of the vote, while Mason finished in second place with 23%.

== Personal life ==
Mason met her husband Rick on her first day of college. They married during his senior year and moved to New Jersey after he was accepted to NYU Law School. They had two daughters.
