= M. L. Mason =

Iowa Supreme Court justice (1906–1990)

Larry Mason

Justice of the Iowa Supreme Court
- In office July 19, 1965 – July 14, 1978

Personal details
- Born: 1906
- Died: 1990 (aged 83–84)

M.L. "Larry" Mason (1906–1990) was a justice of the Iowa Supreme Court from July 19, 1965, to July 14, 1978, appointed from Cerro Gordo County, Iowa.

Political offices
Preceded by G. King Thompson	Justice of the Iowa Supreme Court; 1965–1978	Succeeded by
