= Percy Greene =

American journalist (1897–1977)

- Born: Percy Green; September 7, 1897; Jackson, Mississippi, U.S.
- Died: April 16, 1977 (aged 79); Jackson, Mississippi, U.S.
- Occupations: Newspaper editor, newspaper owner, journalist, political figure
- Spouse: Frances Lee Reed
- Children: 2

Percy Greene (1897–1977) was an American newspaper editor, and journalist. Greene created the Jackson Advocate, Mississippi's first and oldest black-owned newspaper. In the 1940s and 1950s, Greene had been a staunch civil rights activist; but by the 1960s, Green supported segregation. He worked for the Mississippi State Sovereignty Commission, a state agency tasked with fighting desegregation and controlling civil rights activism.

== Early life ==
Percy Greene was born on September 7, 1897, in Jackson, Mississippi. He was one of twelve children born to George Washington Green and Sarah Stone. He used the last name "Green" until around 1921. At the age of 17, Greene joined the United States Army and served at the 25th Infantry Regiment a racially-segregated unit during World War I.

Greene studied law under black attorney-physician Sidney D. Redmond. Greene failed the state bar exam after getting into an altercation with a white man. Greene also attended Jackson College (now Jackson State University). He is in the Jackson State University Hall of Fame for his football talent.

On June 16, 1921, Greene married Frances Lee Reed. The couple had two daughters.

== Career ==
"Negros of Mississippi don't want social rights, they want equal rights"

— Percy Greene (1948)

His early jobs included mail carrier for the U.S. Postal Service, magazine salesman with Tuskegee Institute, and the Civilian Conservation Corps. He also had a stint working for The Mississippi Enterprise. In 1927, Greene founded the National Association of Negro War Veterans, because black veterans were not allowed to join other veterans organizations at the time. He also founded the Colored Veteran, a newspaper for the National Association of Negro War Veterans.

In 1938, Greene started the Jackson Advocate newspaper, Mississippi's oldest black-owned newspaper (as of 1998). By 1948, the Jackson Advocate circulated 3,000 papers, and that number rose to 10,000 papers in 1973. In 1978 after Greene's death, the newspaper was sold to Charles W. Tisdale who continued operations until his death in 2007.

Greene advocated for equal rights, justice and opportunities and spoke about the Mississippi poll tax and the intimidation blacks suffered at the polls. He spoke all over Mississippi and was recognized in the Pittsburgh Courier on their "Top Ten Honor Roll" two years in a row. Eventually he began speaking nationally, in cities like Chicago, Detroit, Los Angeles, New York, and Washington D.C. According to The Pittsburgh Courier the governor of Mississippi, Theodore G. Bilbo, asked Greene to leave the state because he fought against racism "too hard".

President Harry S. Truman, after hearing about Greene’s speech in Washington, D.C., called the Jackson Advocate office and asked what Percy needed in Mississippi and how he could help. Greene said "We need the vote Mr. President. We need the vote…without intimidation, or poll tax... we need the right to vote and the protection of the federal government." The following year, 1948, Greene was photographed by Life magazine and other publications as he voted for the first time. In February 1948, Greene keynoted a Mississippi Citizens Committee, and they supported President Harry S. Truman's civil rights program.

In 1951, Paul B. Johnson Jr. ran for governor of Mississippi, and Greene publicly supported the Johnson ticket, rallying the black voters to support him; this angered white voters who rallied to Mr. Johnson's opponent. When Johnson narrowly lost the election he blamed Greene and said Greene gave him the "kiss of death". After the May 17, 1954 Brown v. Board of Education decision when the U.S. Supreme Court declared school segregation unconstitutional, Greene felt it was the wrong decision and his politics dramatically changed. He was part of a small black middle class in the state, and they wanted to maintain their class status. He supported voting rights and equal education for blacks, and also felt that segregation should continue.

He was critical of the NAACP, and of other civil rights organizations. He was dubbed the "Anti-NAACP editor" and "Uncle Tom", among other names. The Mississippi State Sovereignty Commission paid Greene to attend the 1960 National Association of Colored Publishers and Editors conference, in part to report back on the NAACP activities. Green had been employed by the Mississippi State Sovereignty Commission, and promoted the organization’s views with articles, speeches, telegrams, and letters - some prepared for him by Erle Johnston, the Commission Director.

=== Death ===
Percy Greene died of a stroke on April 16, 1977 in his home in Jackson, Mississippi. He is buried at Elmwood Cemetery in Jackson.
