= Erle Johnston =

Public figure in Mississippi, United States (1917–1995)

- Born: Erle Ennis Johnston Jr. October 10, 1917; Garyville, Louisiana, U.S.
- Died: September 26, 1995 (aged 77); Jackson, Mississippi, U.S.
- Occupations: Public official, newspaperman, author, mayor

Erle Ennis Johnston Jr. (October 10, 1917 – September 26, 1995) was an American public official, newspaperman, author, and mayor in Mississippi. He was campaign associate for Ross Barnett and wrote a biography of the segregationist governor. In 1960, Barnett appointed him public relations director of the pro-segregation Mississippi State Sovereignty Commission. Johnston became its executive director and continued to hold the public relations duties. He held the position under Governor Paul B. Johnson Jr. before resigning in 1968. He worked at The Scott County Times newspaper, before buying it. Johnston was mayor of Forest, Mississippi, from 1981 to 1985.

== Biography ==
Erle Ennis Johnston Jr. was born on October 10, 1917, in Garyville, Louisiana. He attended Grenada High School in Grenada, Mississippi.

In 1960, Ross Barnett appointed him public relations director of the Mississippi State Sovereignty Commission, a state agency tasked with fighting desegregation and controlling civil rights activism. It is believed that Johnston prepared some of Percy Greene's articles, speeches, telegrams, and letters; Greene was an African-American newspaper editor in Jackson, Mississippi that had been employed by the Mississippi State Sovereignty Commission.

In May 1962, Johnson gave a commencement speech at his former high school, Grenada High School, titled "The Practical Way to Maintain a Separate School System in Mississippi" in which he criticized the "extremism" of the NAACP and Citizens Councils. He oversaw production of the Sovereignty Commission's film The Message from Mississippi (1960).

He wrote the books, I Rolled with Ross: A Political Portrait (1980), Mississippi’s Defiant Years, 1953–1973 (1990), and Politics: Mississippi Style (1993).

He was interviewed July 30, 1980, for Eyes on the Prize (1985), the civil rights movement documentary television series. The University of Southern Mississippi has a collection of his papers.

Johnston died September 26, 1995, from heart failure while in hospital in Jackson, Mississippi.
