= Secret police =

Intelligence agency which operates in secrecy

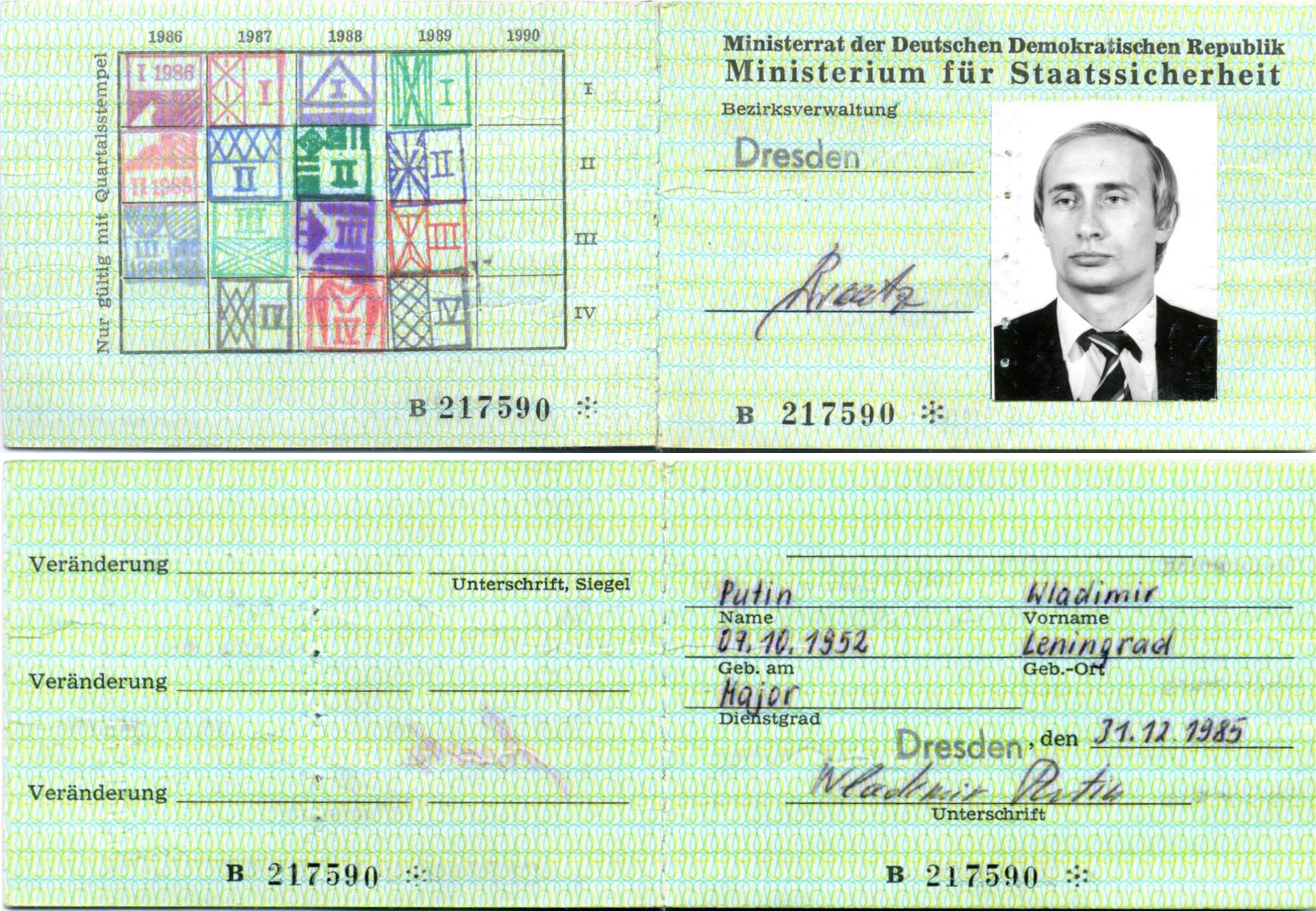
Vladimir Putin's secret police identity card, issued by the East German Stasi, while he was working as a Soviet KGB liaison officer from 1985 to 1989. Both organizations used similar forms of repression.

Secret police (or political police) are police, intelligence or security agencies that engage in covert operations against a government's political, ideological or social opponents and dissidents. Secret police organizations are characteristic of police states governed by authoritarian and totalitarian regimes. They protect the political power of a dictator or regime and often operate outside the law to repress dissidents and weaken political opposition, frequently using violence. They may enjoy legal sanction to hold and charge suspects without ever identifying their organization.

== Functions and methods ==
Ilan Berman and J. Michael Waller describe the secret police as central to totalitarian regimes and "an indispensable device for the consolidation of power, neutralization of the opposition, and construction of a single-party state". In addition to these activities, secret police may also be responsible for tasks not related to suppressing internal dissent, such as gathering foreign intelligence, engaging in counterintelligence, organizing border security, and guarding government buildings and officials. Secret police forces sometimes endure even after the fall of a totalitarian regime.

Arbitrary arrest and detention, abduction and forced disappearance, torture, and assassination are all tools wielded by secret police "to prevent, investigate, or punish (real or imagined) opposition." Because secret police typically act with great discretionary powers "to decide what is a crime" and are a tool used to target political opponents, they operate outside the rule of law.

People apprehended by the secret police are often arbitrarily arrested and detained without due process. While in detention, arrestees may be tortured or subjected to inhumane treatment. Suspects may not receive a public trial, and instead may be convicted in a kangaroo court-style show trial, or by a secret tribunal. Secret police known to have used these approaches in history included the secret police of East Germany (the Ministry for State Security or Stasi) and Portuguese PIDE.

== Control ==
A single secret service may pose a potential threat to the central political authority. Political scientist Sheena Chestnut Greitens writes that:

When it comes to their security forces, autocrats face a fundamental 'coercing dilemma' between empowerment and control. ... Autocrats must empower their security forces with enough coercing capacity to enforce internal order and conduct external defense. Equally important to their survival, however, they must control that capacity, to ensure it is not turned against them.

Authoritarian regimes therefore attempt to engage in "coup-proofing" (designing institutions to minimize risks of a coup). Two methods of doing so are:

- Increasing fragmentation (i.e., dividing powers among the regime security apparatuses to prevent "any single agency from amassing enough political power to carry out a coup") and
- Increasing exclusivity (i.e., purging the regime security apparatus to favor familial, social, ethnic, religious, and tribal groups perceived as more loyal).

== History ==
=== Africa ===
==== Egypt ====
Egypt is home to Africa and the Middle East's first internal security service: the State Security Investigations Service. Initially it was formed during the British occupation of Egypt as the Intelligence wing of the regular police. After the 1952 coup, the State Security apparatus was reformed and reorganized to suit the security concerns of the new socialist regime of Gamal Abdel Nasser. The SSIS was made a separate branch of the Ministry of Interior and separated from the regular police command. During the Nasser era, It was intensively trained by the Soviet KGB on coercive interrogation techniques, mass surveillance, public intimidation and political suppression. The SSIS was responsible for suppressing opposition groups to Nasser and his successors (Sadat and Mubarak).

Torture was a systematic practice by that repressive apparatus. During the war on terror, the SSIS received suspected terrorists that were sent to Egypt from the United States and interrogated them using torture. After the 2011 revolution, demonstrators demanded that the service be dissolved and several buildings (including the headquarters in Nasr City) were stormed by protesters who gathered evidence of torture tools, secret cells and documents showing surveillance on citizens. On March 15 2011, Egypt's Minister of Interior announced the dissolution of the State Security and declared the new National Security Agency would replace it and be responsible for its internal security and counter-terrorist duties.

==== Ethiopia ====
From 1974 to 1987, Ethiopia was ruled by a communist military junta known as the Derg (in 1987 the country formally reformed into a presidential republic, but the same people remained in power until May 1991). The Derg built a police state with a brutal military government. The brutality of its regime was particularly evident in the 1976-1978, during military campaign, called Red Terror, against perceived opponents. To exercise total control over the country, the Derg needed a secret police. And it formed one in August 1978: it became known as the Central Revolutionary Investigation Department (CRID). CRID was responsible for suppressing dissent and identifying targets for state repression in Ethiopia. The department also has been monitoring opposition in government-controlled areas and regime dissidents. CRID is considered to be the most advanced institution of violence in Derg's Ethiopia.

==== Uganda ====
In Uganda, the State Research Bureau (SRB) was a secret police organisation for President Idi Amin. The Bureau tortured many Ugandans, operating on behalf of a regime responsible for more than five hundred thousand violent deaths. The SRB attempted to infiltrate every area of Ugandan life.

==== Zimbabwe ====
In Zimbabwe, the Central Intelligence Organisation (CIO) was the secret police of President Robert Mugabe who is responsible for detaining, torturing, mass beating, raping and starving thousands of civilians on the orders of Mugabe.

=== Asia ===
==== China ====
In East Asia, the Embroidered Uniform Guard (Chinese: 錦衣衞; pinyin: Jǐnyīwèi) of the Ming dynasty was founded in the 1360s by the Hongwu Emperor and served as the dynasty's secret police until the collapse of Ming rule in 1644. Originally, their main functions were to serve as the emperor's bodyguard and to spy on his subjects and report any plots of rebellion or regicide directly to the emperor. Over time, the organization took on law enforcement and judicial functions and grew to be immensely powerful, with the power to overrule ordinary judicial rulings and to investigate, interrogate, and punish anyone, including members of the imperial family. In 1420, a second secret police organization run by eunuchs, known as the Eastern Depot (東廠; Dōng Chǎng), was formed to suppress suspected political opposition to the usurpation of the throne by the Yongle Emperor. Combined, these two organizations made the Ming dynasty one of the world's first police states.

The Ministry of State Security (国家安全部; Guójiā Ānquán Bù) in modern China controls a network of provincial and local State Security Bureaus, integrated with local Public Security Bureaus which make up part of the policing system of China. The MSS has its own branch of the People's Police, known as the State Security Police, with officers which have the dual tasks of law enforcement and repressing political dissent. State security bureaus and public security bureaus are functionally co-located within the same buildings as each other. The MSS and the Ministry of Public Security control the overall national police network of China and the two agencies share resources and closely coordinate with each other.

==== Hong Kong ====
In British Hong Kong, the Special Branch was established in 1934 originally as an anti-communist squad under MI5 with assistance from MI6. The branch later joined the Crime Department of the Royal Hong Kong Police Force in 1946 and focused on preventing pro-KMT rightists and pro-CCP leftists from infiltrating the colony.

The National Security Department in the current HKSAR is a secret police agency created after the enactment of the Hong Kong National Security Law. The NSD has accused and arrested dissenting voices in Hong Kong for "endangering" the national security, including pro-democracy politicians, protestors, and journalists. Some websites were also reportedly banned by the department, including Hong Kong Watch.

==== Iraq ====
In the Middle East, located in Baghdad. Shurta was one of the most powerful intelligence and secret police organizations of the Abbasid era which was led by the Abbasids in the 8th and 9th centuries during the Golden Age of Islam.

==== Japan ====
In Japan, the Kempeitai existed from 1881 to 1945 and were described as secret police by the Australian War Memorial. It had an equivalent branch in the Imperial Japanese Navy known as the Tokkeitai. However, their civilian counterpart known as the Tokkō was formed in 1911. Its task consisted of controlling political groups and ideologies in Imperial Japan, resembling closer the other secret police agencies of the time period. For this it earned the nickname "the Thought Police".

==== South Korea ====
The Korean Central Intelligence Agency or KCIA is a secret police agency which acted extra-judicially and was involved in such activities as kidnapping a presidential candidate and the assassination of Park Chung-hee, among other things.

==== Syria ====
The General Intelligence Directorate or the GID was the secret police organization of the Assad regime which ruled Ba'athist Syria that repressed political dissidence and aided in the hunting for anti-Assad rebels until it was dissolved in December 2024 during the 2024 Syrian Rebel Offensives against Syrian Government forces. It culminated in the toppling of President Bashar al-Assad when he was forced to flee to Russia when Damascus was encircled by rebel forces.

==== Taiwan ====
In Taiwan, the National Security Bureau, established in 1954, was the regime's main intelligence agency. The Taiwan Garrison Command acted as a secret police/national security body which existed as a branch of the Republic of China Armed Forces. The agency was established at the end of World War II and operated throughout the Cold War. It was disbanded on 1 August 1992. It was responsible for suppressing activities viewed as promoting democracy and Taiwan independence.

=== Europe ===
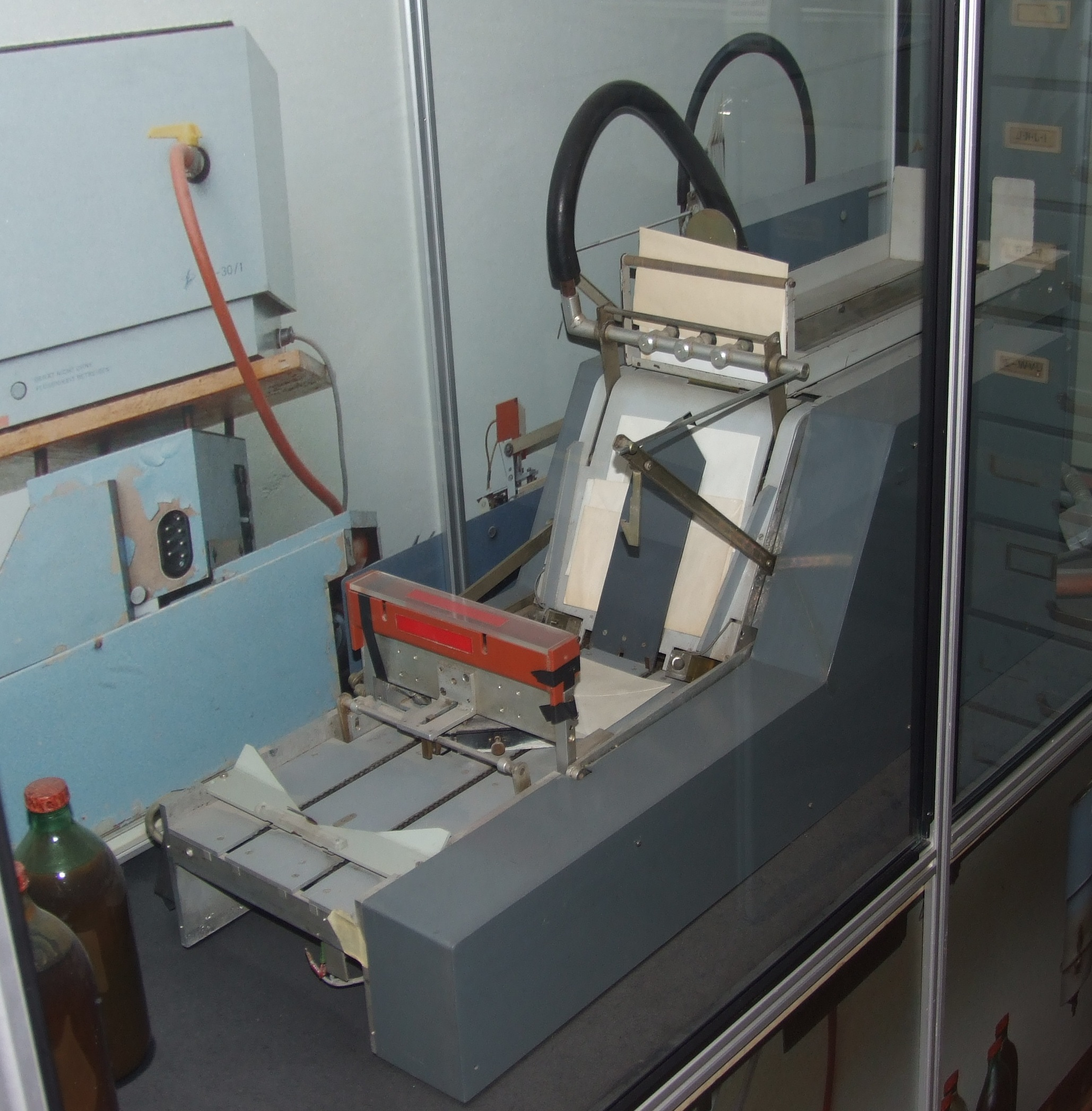
A machine used by the East German Ministry for State Security to re-glue envelopes after mail had been opened for examination

The institutionalisation of state secret security services began in the 16th century with greater professionalisation, bureaucratisation and specialisation of state security, as intensified competition between states drove governments to maximise their control of resources. The Inquisition served as a model for many such state agencies.

The French revolutionary Minister of Police Joseph Fouché devised a system of spying on the whole of society, which became emulated all over Europe by secret police or political police.

Secret police organizations originated in 18th-century Europe after the French Revolution and the Congress of Vienna. Such operations were established in an effort to detect any possible conspiracies or revolutionary subversion. The peak of secret-police operations in most of Europe was 1815 to 1860, "when restrictions on voting, assembly, association, unions and the press were so severe in most European countries that opposition groups were forced into conspiratorial activities." The Geheime Staatspolizei of Austria and the Geheimpolizei of Prussia were particularly notorious during this period. After 1860, the use of secret police declined due to increasing liberalization, except in autocratic regimes such as Tsarist Russia.

==== Germany ====
In Nazi Germany from 1933 to 1945, the Geheime Staatspolizei (Secret State Police, Gestapo) and Geheime Feldpolizei (Secret Field Police, GFP) were a secret police organization used to identify and eliminate opposition, including suspected organized resistance. Its claimed main duty, according to a 1936 law, was "to investigate and suppress all anti-State tendencies". One method used to spy on citizens was to intercept letters or telephone calls. They encouraged ordinary Germans to inform on each other. As part of the Reich Security Main Office, it was also a key organizer of the Holocaust. Although the Gestapo had a relatively small number of personnel (32,000 in 1944), "it maximized these small resources through informants and a large number of denunciations from the local population".

After the defeat of the Nazis in World War II, Germany was split into West and East Germany. East Germany became a socialist state and was ruled by the Socialist Unity Party of Germany, which was closely aligned with the Soviet Union and the rest of the Eastern Bloc. Its secret police organization, the Ministry for State Security (Ministerium für Staatsicherheit), commonly referred to as the Stasi, made use of an extensive network of civilian informers. From the 1970s, the main form of political, cultural and religious repression practiced by the Stasi was a form of silent repression called Zersetzung ("Decomposition"). This involved the sustained use of covert psychological harassment methods against people, which were designed to cause mental and emotional health problems, and thereby debilitate them and cause them to become socially isolated. Directed-energy weapons are considered by some survivors and analysts to have also been used as a constituent part of Zersetzung methods, although this is not definitely proven.

==== Hungary ====
The House of Terror museum in Budapest displays the headquarters for the Arrow Cross Party, which killed hundreds of Jews in its basement, among other targets considered "enemies of the race-based state". The same building was used by the State Protection Authority (or ÁVH) secret police. The Soviet-aligned ÁVH moved into the former fascist police headquarters and used it to torture and execute state opponents.

==== Italy ====
In fascist Italy (1922–1943) and the Italian Social Republic (RSI), OVRA were a fascist Italian secret police organization.

==== Portugal ====
The PIDE was the Portuguese security agency and secret police that existed from 1933 to 1969 during the Estado Novo regime of António de Oliveira Salazar. In 1969, the name was changed to Directorate-General of Security. It was dissolved with the Carnation Revolution in 1974.

==== Russia ====
Ivan the Terrible implemented Oprichnina in Russia between 1565 and 1572. In the Russian Empire, the secret police forces were the Third Section of the Imperial Chancery and then the Okhrana. Agents of the Okhrana were vital in identifying and suppressing opponents of the Tsar. The Okhrana engaged in torture and infiltration of opponents. They infiltrated labor unions, political parties, and newspapers. After the Russian Revolution, the Soviet Union established the Cheka, OGPU, NKVD, NKGB, and MVD. Cheka, as an authorized secret police force under the rule of the Bolsheviks, suppressed political opponents during the Red Terror. It also enacted counterintelligence operations such as Operation Trust, in which it set up a fake anti-Bolshevik organization to identify opponents. It was the temporary forerunner to the KGB, a later secret police agency used for similar purposes. The NKVD participated in the Great Purge under Stalin.

=== North America ===
==== Cuba ====
In Cuba, President Fulgencio Batista's secret police, known as the Bureau for the Repression of Communist Activities (or BRAC), suppressed political opponents such as the 26th of July Movement through methods including violent interrogations.

Under the Communist Party of Cuba, the Ministry of the Interior has served a number of secret policing functions. As recently as 1999, the Human Rights Watch reported that repression of dissidents was routine, albeit harsher after heightened periods of opposition activity. The Bureau of Democracy, Human Rights, and Labor under the US State Department reported that Cuba's Ministry of the Interior utilizes a network of informants known as the Committees for the Defense of the Revolution (or CDR) to monitor government opponents. Secret state police have operated in secret among CDR groups, and most adult Cubans are officially members. CDR are tasked with informing on other Cubans and monitoring activity in their neighborhoods.

==== Mexico ====
During the Truman Doctrine, Mexican president Miguel Alemán Valdés created DFS to combat communist opposition. The agency was later replaced by DISEN in 1985 after DFS agents were working for the Guadalajara Cartel. In 1989, it was replaced by CISEN.

==== United States ====
In Mississippi, the Mississippi State Sovereignty Commission (or "Sov-Com") was a state agency given unusual authority by the governor of Mississippi from 1956 to 1977, to investigate and police private citizens in order to uphold racial segregation. This authority was used to suppress and spy on the activities of civil rights workers, along with others suspected of sentiments contrary to white supremacy. Agents from the Sov-Com wiretapped and bugged citizens of Mississippi, and historians identify the agency as a secret police force. Among other things, the Sov-Com collaborated with the Ku Klux Klan and engaged in jury tampering to harass targets. The agency ceased to function in 1973, but was not officially dissolved until 1977. The Sov-Com served as a model for the Louisiana State Sovereignty Commission, the Florida Legislative Investigation Committee, and the Alabama State Sovereignty Commission.

In private writings in 1945, President Harry S. Truman wrote that the Federal Bureau of Investigation (under Director J. Edgar Hoover) was tending towards becoming a secret police force:

We want no Gestapo or Secret Police. F.B.I. is tending in that direction. They are dabbling in sex life scandles [sic] and plain blackmail when they should be catching criminals. They also have a habit of sneering at local law enforcement officers.

Beginning a decade later in 1956, Hoover's FBI began the COINTELPRO project, aimed at suppressing domestic political opponents. Among other targets, this included Martin Luther King Jr.

During Donald Trump's second presidency (2025–incumbent), United States Immigration and Customs Enforcement (ICE) and/or the United States Department of Homeland Security (DHS) been accused of being a secret police force, with critics of Trump and DHS/ICE stating that the agency has been targeting their perceived enemies within the United States.

=== South America ===
==== Brazil ====
During the Getúlio Vargas dictatorship, between 1930 and 1946, the Department of Political and Social Order (DOPS) was the government's secret police.

During the military dictatorship in Brazil, DOPS was employed by the military regime along with the Department of Information Operations - Center for Internal Defense Operations (or DOI-CODI) and the National Intelligence Service (or SNI), and engaged in kidnappings, torture, and attacks against theaters and bookstores.

==== Chile ====
The National Intelligence Directorate, or DINA, was a powerful secret police agency under the rule of Augusto Pinochet, which was charged with killings and torture related to repression of political opponents. Chilean government investigations found that over 30,000 people were tortured by the agency.

==== Venezuela ====
During the dictatorship of Marcos Pérez Jiménez, the Seguridad Nacional secret police investigated, arrested, tortured, and assassinated political opponents to the Venezuelan government. From 1951 until 1953, it operated a prison camp on Guasina Island, which was effectively a forced labour camp. The Seguridad Nacional was abolished following the overthrow of Pérez Jiménez on 23 January 1958.

During the crisis in Venezuela and Venezuelan protests, Vice Presidents Tareck El Aissami and Delcy Rodríguez have been accused of using SEBIN to oppress political demonstrations. SEBIN director and general Manuel Cristopher Figuera reported that SEBIN would torture political demonstrators during interrogation sessions.

== See also ==
- Chekism
- Committee of Public Safety
- Counterintelligence state
- Death squad
- Extrajudicial punishment
- Gestapo
- High policing
- List of historical secret police organizations
- List of secret police organizations
- Mass surveillance
- McCarthyism
- NKVD
- Police state
- Thought Police
- Secret service
- Frumentarii
