= Maurice L. Malone =

American lawyer and politician

Maurice L. Malone was a lawyer, automobile dealer, state legislator in Mississippi and served as director of the Mississippi State Sovereignty Commission, a segregationist state agency that targeted civil rights activists, produced propaganda materials, and schemed to undermine the U.S. Supreme Court ruling Brown v. Board of Education. He represented George County. He lived in Lucedale. He served as president of Perkinston Junior College's board of trustees. He succeeded Ney Gore as director of the Sovereignty Commission. He ran for re-election as a state representative.
