= Police Union of German States =

- Formation: 1851
- Founded at: Dresden
- Dissolved: 1866
- Type: Secret police
- Region served: Central Europe
- Official language: German

The Police Union of German States was the first known initiative for international law enforcement cooperation. Established in 1851 in response to the Revolutions of 1848, the organization served as an information exchange among the secret police forces of a number of German-speaking countries.

== History ==
=== Background ===
In 1833 a centralized internal security service was established by the German Confederation. Headquartered in Frankfurt, the Central Investigating Agency consisted of several former investigating magistrates tasked with gathering information on seditious and subversive organizations—as well as the press, publishers, and bookstores—obtained by the police services of the member states of the Confederation. Information collected by the Central Investigating Agency was shared with the police of the German states concerned, as well as the Federal Convention. The same year, Austria established the Information Office in Mainz, which performed largely similar functions. The Central Investigating Agency and Information Office were both strictly intelligence agencies, with no police power of their own. The two institutions would occasionally exchange intelligence with each other.

The successful suppression of seditious elements within German-speaking states led to the permanent suspension of the Central Investigating Agency in 1842, its services no longer needed.

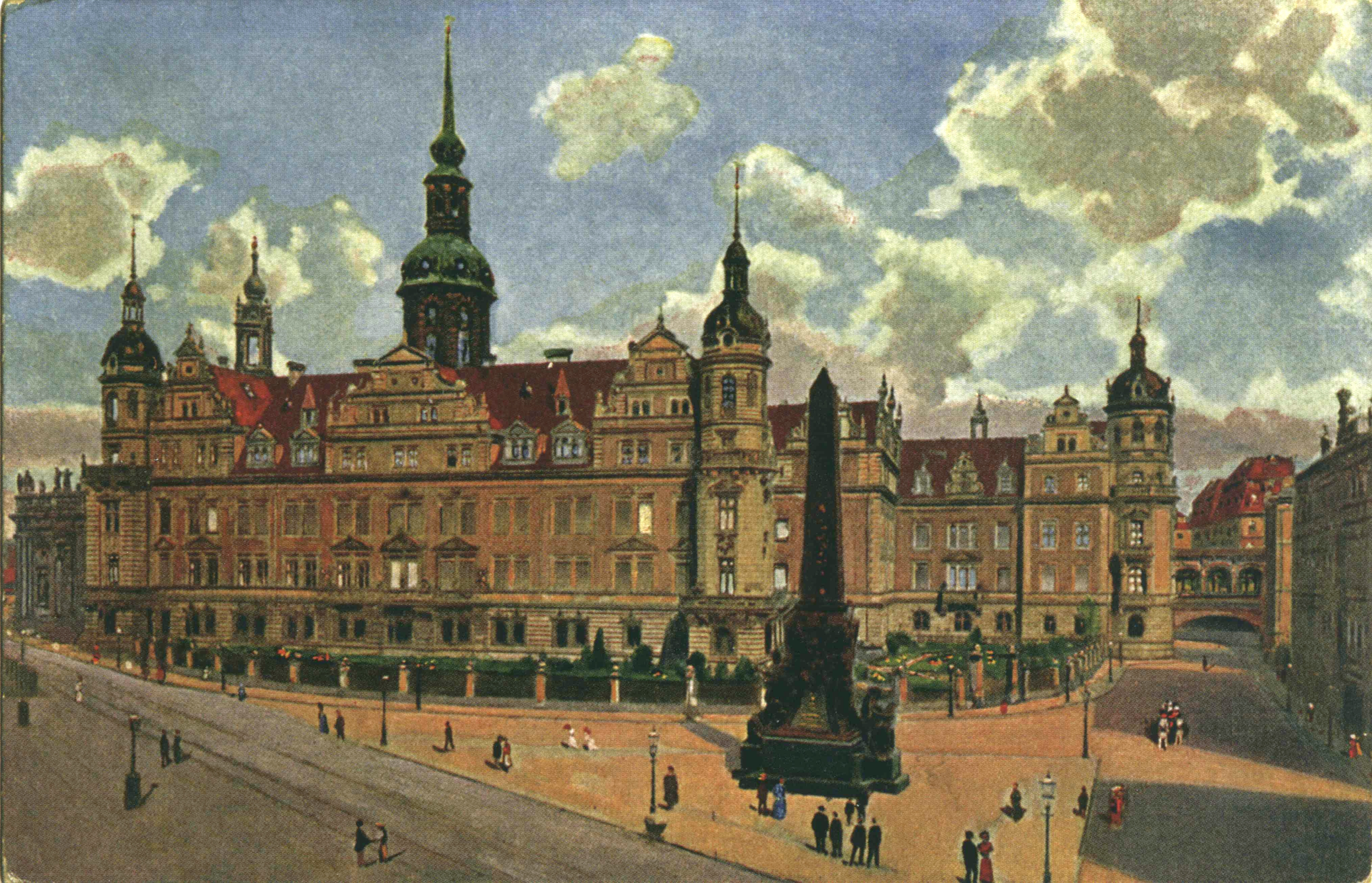
The Police Union of German States was established after an 1851 meeting of secret police chiefs in Dresden.

=== Formation ===
During 1848, Europe was rocked by a series of revolts and revolutions with Austria, Prussia, Hungary, Bohemia, the Two Sicilies, and France all experiencing various levels of domestic unrest. In response to the events of three years prior, in 1851, the police president of Berlin – Karl Ludwig Friedrich von Hinckeldey – sent letters to law enforcement officials in Hanover, Saxony and Vienna calling for cross-border cooperation in the policing of political radicals. As a result of von Hinckeldey's letter, a conference was held on 9 April 1851 in Dresden attended by staff from the secret police services of the independent states of Prussia, Austria, Saxony and Hanover. Before the end of the year, these forces were joined in cooperation with those of Bavaria, Baden and Württemberg and the Police Union of German States was informally created. (Note: The union was an informal grouping that was never solemnized by formal treaties or compacts.)

Early proposals to expand the police union to include political and secret police agencies outside the German-speaking world ultimately did not bear fruit, though occasional instances of cooperation – usually through middlemen – with law enforcement agencies in Belgium, Denmark and Britain are recorded.

=== Dissolution and legacy ===
The union was dissolved in 1866 with the outbreak of the Seven Weeks' War between the Austrian Empire and the Kingdom of Prussia, the two dominant countries from which the Police Union drew its membership.

The Police Union of German States has been described as the first known instance of formally institutionalized international law enforcement cooperation.

== Operations and activities ==
The union's activities were strictly focused on the maintenance of political order, with routine crime and criminals outside its area of interest. Information on political radicals and subversive organizations were exchanged between officials of the member agencies at meetings held one to three times annually. Between meetings, information would be disseminated about wanted political opponents among the member agencies through weekly magazines that would be published by the union for distribution to its participating forces. The union also recruited agents in New York, London, Brussels, and Paris to gather intelligence on dissidents and radicals operating beyond the reach of its member agencies.

== See also ==
- Bavarian Political Police
- Europol
- Geheime Staatspolizei (Austria)
- Prussian Secret Police
