= Oxford, U.S.A. =

Film about the de-segregation of Ole Miss

Oxford, U.S.A. is a 16 mm documentary film about the integration of the University of Mississippi in 1962. It promotes the segregationist cause by arguing that the federal government violated the U.S. Constitution when it prohibitted segregation in public schools. Three prints of the film were purchased by the Mississippi Sovereignty Commission, a state agency established to defend and promote Mississippi's segregation practices against federal intervention in the wake of the U.S. Supreme Court's Brown v. Board of Education decision. A leader of the commission was scheduled to speak after a showing of the film. The commission also funded the 1960 film The Message from Mississippi promoting the segregationist "way of life".

The forty three minute, 16 mm film, produced by Patrick M. Sims of Sims Associates, a Dallas, Texas based company, includes news footage and interviews with officials and politicians including Governor Ross Barnett, Lieutenant Governor Paul B. Johnson, Jr., and Attorney General Joe T. Patterson. According to the University of Mississippi libraries, the film was advertised with screenings on April 24, 26, and 27, 1963.

Sovereignty Commission Director's reports catalogue its speakers bureau, pamphlets, newspaper propaganda program, and plans for an advertisement promoting the segregationist cause as well as screenings of the film.
