= Wendell Harris (politician) =

Louisiana politician

Wendell P. Harris (March 13, 1917 - February 5, 1994) was a state legislator in Louisiana. He served in the Louisiana Senate. He was involved with the Louisiana Un-American Activities Committee (LUAC) and the Louisiana Sovereignty Commission. His son was Wendell Preston Harris Jr. an American football player.

Harris won a seat on the Louisiana Senate in early 1960 representing East Baton Rouge Parish as a Democrat beating the Republican nominee Dr. Roger E. Peak by a large margin. At the start of the session he put forward two bills to alter the election process in the state. He was known as an ardent segregationist. In 1961 he was indicted with two others for wiretapping ministers who denounced segregation. In August 1963 he announced that he would stand for another term in the senate, but he lost to J. D. Deblieux. The wiretapping charges were dismissed in 1964 by a district judge, but new federal charges were filed a few days later. The case was abandoned against Harris and the two others involved December 1966.

Harris died on February 5, 1994, aged 76, at the Lake Regional Medical Center in Louisiana.
