= Geheime Staatspolizei (Austria) =

Secret police of the Archduchy of Austria (1786)

The Geheime Staatspolizei (Secret State Police) was the secret police service of the Archduchy of Austria.

The Secret State Police was established in September 1786, during a general reorganization of the Austrian police, under the leadership of Johann Anton von Pergen. In addition to von Pergen, the force initially consisted of two additional officers—or three personnel in total—and was tasked with domestic counterintelligence as well as the monitoring of political subversives and public opinion. However, at the insistence of the Archduke Joseph II, the force was to be conservative in its operations—particularly in the monitoring of mail—so as "not to damage the reputation of the post and civil freedom". Indeed, Joseph II's sanction for the creation of the Secret State Police was borne more out of his insatiable craving for information than a desire to suppress criticism, as he believed the public should be permitted to critique the government.

The Secret State Police gathered its information through the monitoring of mail, the recruiting of domestic servants as informants, and the collection of information from the regular police. Some of the methods, such as the monitoring of mail, produced information used to guide investigations but inadmissible in court under Austrian law. The Secret State Police occasionally secretly detained Staatsverbrecher (political criminals) suspected of high treason who could not be subject to public detention and trial without the risk of igniting public sympathy. To avoid transforming them into social or political icons, their guilt and punishment was secretly and singularly determined by the Archduke.

== See also ==
- Police Union of German States
- Prussian Secret Police
- Gestapo
