= Judson A. Thigpen =

American politician

Judson A. Thigpen Sr.

Mississippi House of Representatives
- In office 1964–1972

Personal details
- Born: December 20, 1892
- Died: February 20, 2001 (aged 108)
- Children: Judson A. Thigpen Jr.
- Occupation: Politician, U.S. Navy veteran, Businessman, Tree farmer

Military service
- Branch/service: United States Navy

Judson A. Thigpen Sr. (December 20, 1892 – February 20, 2001) was an American known for his diverse career, including his involvement in politics, military service, and business ventures.

== Biography ==
Judson A. Thigpen Sr. was born on December 20, 1892. He served as a member of the Mississippi House of Representatives from 1964 to 1972. He was also part of a family tradition of public service, with his son following in his footsteps as a state legislator. His father and grandfather had also served in the Mississippi House of Representatives.

In addition to his political career, Thigpen had a diverse set of occupations. He served in the U.S. Navy and worked as a petroleum distributor. He also owned a tree farm and operated a store.

Thigpen is noted for his proposal to abolish the inactive Mississippi Sovereignty Commission. Furthermore, a Baseball Annex at Delta State University was named in honor of his son, Judson A. Thigpen Jr.
