= Ruth Perry (disambiguation) =

Ruth Perry (1939–2017) was a Liberian politician.

Ruth Perry may also refer to:

- Ruth Perry (librarian), American librarian, journalist, and civil rights activist
- Ruth Perry (literary scholar) (born 1943), American literary scholar
- Ruth E. Hodge (born 1937), American archivist, author, educator, and community activist, whose birth name was Ruth Perry
- Ruth Perry (headteacher) (died 2023), British headteacher whose death sparked concerns about inspections by the education watchdog Ofsted
