= The Message from Mississippi =

Segregationist film from Mississippi

The Message from Mississippi is a state-sponsored 1960 segregationist propaganda film produced by the Mississippi Sovereignty Commission, a state government agency established to promote and defend segregation in the wake of the Brown v. Board of Education U.S. Supreme Court decision desegregating public schools. In the film, Mississippi governor Ross Barnett says that Blacks in Mississippi preferred the state's segregated way of life.

The Sovereignty Commission's work included investigations of civil rights groups and propaganda to support segregation including pamphlets and funding for media programming. The commission also produced the film Oxford, U.S.A. following events at the University of Mississippi when it was integrated with federal forces.

Approximately $30,000 was paid to Dobbs-Maynard Advertising Agency in Jackson, Mississippi to make the film when all approvals were finally received. Further expenditures were requested to promote the film and a special committee was established to investigate spending on the film.

== Reception ==
A review in the Los Angeles Times of Dawn Porter's documentary film Spies of Mississippi, which was adapted from a book by Rick Bowers, describes Message from Mississippi as "an astonishing work of delusional contemporary propaganda." The article quotes the film's claim that: “Out of the statewide pattern of segregation, mutual respect and cooperation among the races has arisen a productive, law-abiding way of life.”

== Legacy ==
PBS aired a snippet from the film as part of its American Experience programming on the Jim Crow era. The Message also may have been the name of a project of the Commission according to some personal records that have been archived.
