= Alabama State Sovereignty Commission =

American state government agency

The Alabama State Sovereignty Commission was a government agency established in the U.S. state of Alabama to combat desegregation, which operated from 1963 to 1973. The agency doubled as an intelligence network, and kept files on civil rights activists.

== History ==
The Mississippi State Sovereignty Commission was founded in 1956, and was the organizational template for the Louisiana State Sovereignty Commission, and the Alabama State Sovereignty Commission.

In 1963, the Alabama State Sovereignty Commission was established with a seven member board led by Alabama Governor George Wallace and Bull Connor. It was budgeted $50,000 USD and exempted from public records laws. The Alabama Legislative Commission to Preserve the Peace (Commission to Preserve the Peace) was established by the Alabama Legislature the same year. Wallace appointed members J. Kirkman Jackson, James Hardin Faulkner, and Joseph S. Meade, all lawyers from Birmingham; and Jack Giles Sr., a Huntsville lawyer; state senator Walter Givhan of Dallas County, Alabama; and C. Herbert Lancaster of the Alabama Citizens Council movement; as well as St. Clair News-Aegis newspaper publisher Edmund R. Blair. Blair had campaigned for Wallace.

The Commission acquired photographs of the Montgomery Rights March held in March 1965. The film production agency, Keitz & Herndon (Rod Keitz and Larry Herndon) produced a film about the march for the Commission, titled State of Alabama (1965). Journalist Bryan Lyman writing in the Montgomery Advertiser in 2019 described the film as "bizarre and offensive mix of conspiracy theories, endless crowd shots and racist caricatures of prominent civil rights leaders, including Rev. Martin Luther King Jr." The Alabama Department of Archives and History holds the film. The 1987 film "Eyes on the Prize" includes an excerpt from the film.

The Commission published the Sovereignty Commission Bulletin. The first issue headline read, "Ben Brown is Dead, Is Law Enforcement Also Dead?" (published July 1968), Brown had been an activist.

In 1970, the Commission produced an 11 page voting guide. The University of South Alabama holds archival materials about the agency.

== Filmography ==
- State of Alabama (1965), a propaganda film created by film production agency Keitz & Herndon, for the Alabama State Sovereignty Commission on the 1965 civil rights march in Alabama (ASSC project)

== See also ==
- Mississippi State Sovereignty Commission
- Louisiana State Sovereignty Commission
- Florida Legislative Investigation Committee
