= Charley Eugene Johns =

32nd Governor of Florida

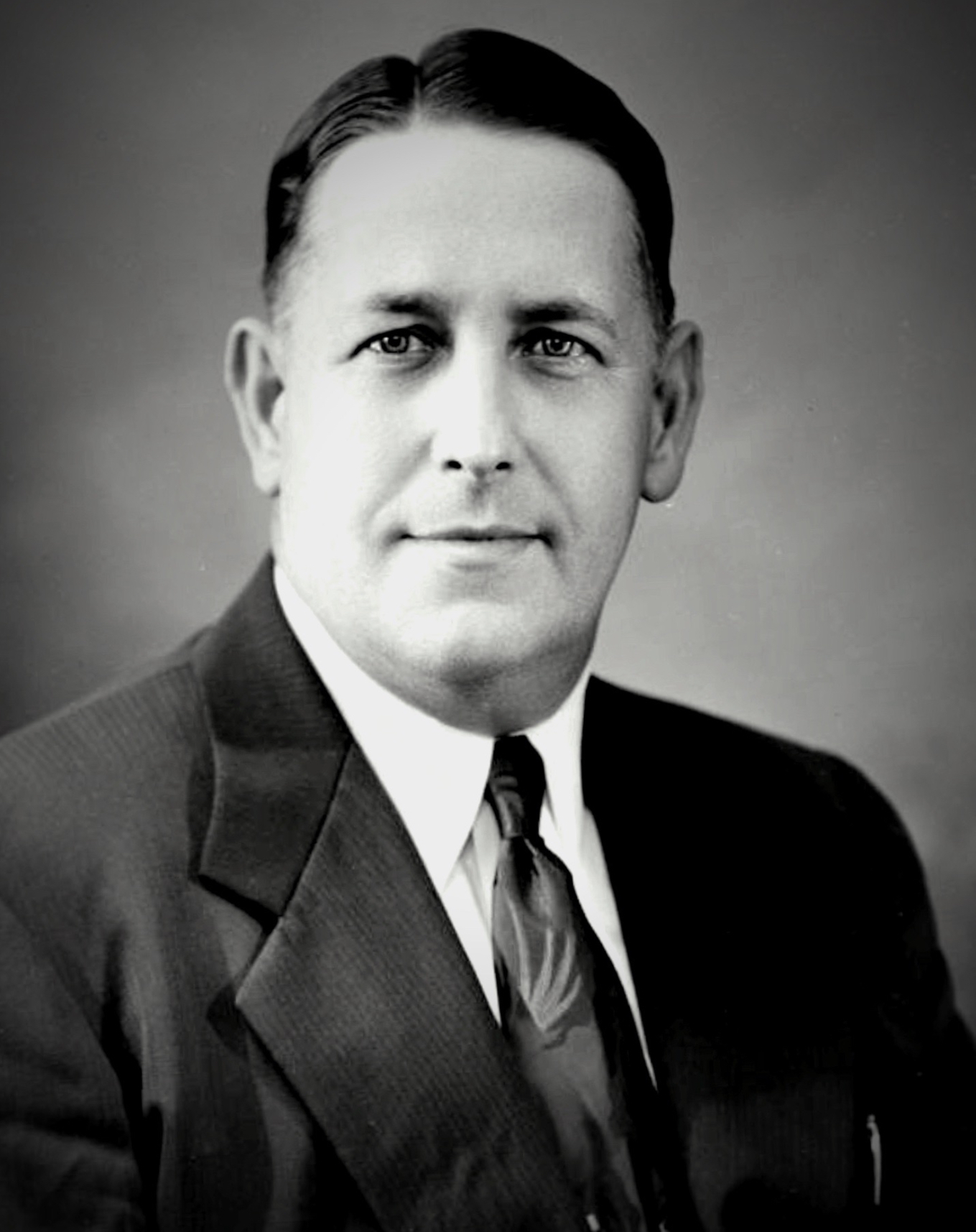

32nd Governor of Florida
- In office September 28, 1953 – January 4, 1955
- Preceded by: Daniel T. McCarty
- Succeeded by: LeRoy Collins

Member of the Florida Senate
- In office 1937–1953, 1955–1966

Members of the Florida House of Representatives
- In office 1935–1937

Personal details
- Born: February 27, 1905 Starke, Florida, U.S.
- Died: January 23, 1990 (aged 84) Gainesville, Florida, U.S.
- Party: Democratic
- Spouse: Thelma Brinson
- Profession: insurance agent, railroad conductor

Charley Eugene Johns (February 27, 1905 – January 23, 1990) was an American politician. Johns was the 32nd Governor of Florida for fifteen months from 1953 to 1955. With the exception of those months, he served in the Florida Senate from 1937 to 1966. From 1956 to 1965, he chaired a Senate committee, commonly known as the Johns Committee, that attempted to link civil rights organizations to communists and conducted a witch hunt against homosexuals in higher education.

== Biography ==
Johns was born in Starke, Florida, on February 27, 1905. He attended the University of Florida briefly, and then worked for ten years as a railroad brakeman and conductor. He set up an insurance agency that would operate for 40 years, occasionally profiting from selling policies to state agencies. He married Thelma Brinson in 1927 and they soon had a son.

He founded and served as president of the Community State Bank in Starke.

He was elected to the Florida House of Representatives and took office for the 1935 session. He was elected to the State Senate as a Democrat to serve in the 1937 session. Johns was a member of the "Pork Chop Gang", (Note: The Tampa Tribune created this moniker in 1955.) a group of 20 conservative legislators from North Florida who favored racial segregation and consolidated political power and money in the northern, more rural parts of the state. A gerrymandered voting system allowed them to control the legislature for decades.

Early in his career as a state senator he promoted, without success, the construction of a portable electric chair that could be transported by truck with an electric generator and set up in the jail or courthouse where a convicted person was sentenced.

Johns became the President of the Senate in April 1953. (Note: The president of the Senate was elected by the members of Senate who were not up for re-election. His older brother Markley Johns (1895–1932) had been elected to that position in the 1933 Senate, but died of pneumonia before the term began.) Upon the death of Governor Dan McCarty on September 28, 1953, Johns became the Acting Governor under the provisions of the state constitution. Commonly referred to as "Governor", his proper title was "Acting Governor". As Acting Governor, Johns promoted highway construction and the elimination of tolls on the Overseas Highway between Miami and Key West. He also failed during the 1953 legislative session in his first attempt to establish "a joint legislative committee to investigate criminal and subversive activities".

In 1954, Johns ran unsuccessfully for the Democratic nomination for the election to complete the remaining two years of McCarty's term, losing the Democratic primary on a vote of 380,323 to 314,198 to LeRoy Collins on May 25. (Note: These were the results of a second primary after none of the three contenders in the first primary won a majority.) He ended his service as governor on January 4, 1955. He took his seat in the Senate once more and that year he introduced and won passage of legislation prohibiting hotels from discriminating on the basis of religion in their advertising. He served in the Senate until 1966. Throughout his Senate career he promoted prison reform.

Johns is most remembered for his support and chairmanship of the infamous Florida Legislative Investigation Committee, nicknamed the "Johns Committee" because of Johns' chairmanship. This committee participated in the Red Scare and Lavender scare by investigating communists, homosexuals, and civil rights advocates among the students and faculty of Florida's university system. They were responsible for revoking teachers' certificates and firing university professors. By 1963, the committee had forced the dismissal or resignation of over 100 professors and deans at the University of Florida, Florida State University and the University of South Florida. The state legislature ended funding for the committee in 1964 after it released a report called Homosexuality and Citizenship in Florida, which infamously became known as the "Purple Pamphlet". Its photographs depicting homosexual acts outraged legislators and prosecutors threatened action against its authors for distributing pornography.

Johns remained proud of the Committee's work. In 1972 he told an interviewer: "I don't get no love out of hurting people. But that situation in Gainesville, my Lord have mercy. I never saw nothing like it in my life. If we saved one boy from being made homosexual, it was justified."

Johns died in a Gainesville hospital on January 23, 1990, after a long illness.

== Notes ==
Political offices
Preceded by Daniel T. McCarty	Governor of Florida; September 28, 1953 – January 4, 1955	Succeeded by LeRoy Collins
