= Johann Anton von Pergen =

Austrian diplomat (1725–1814)

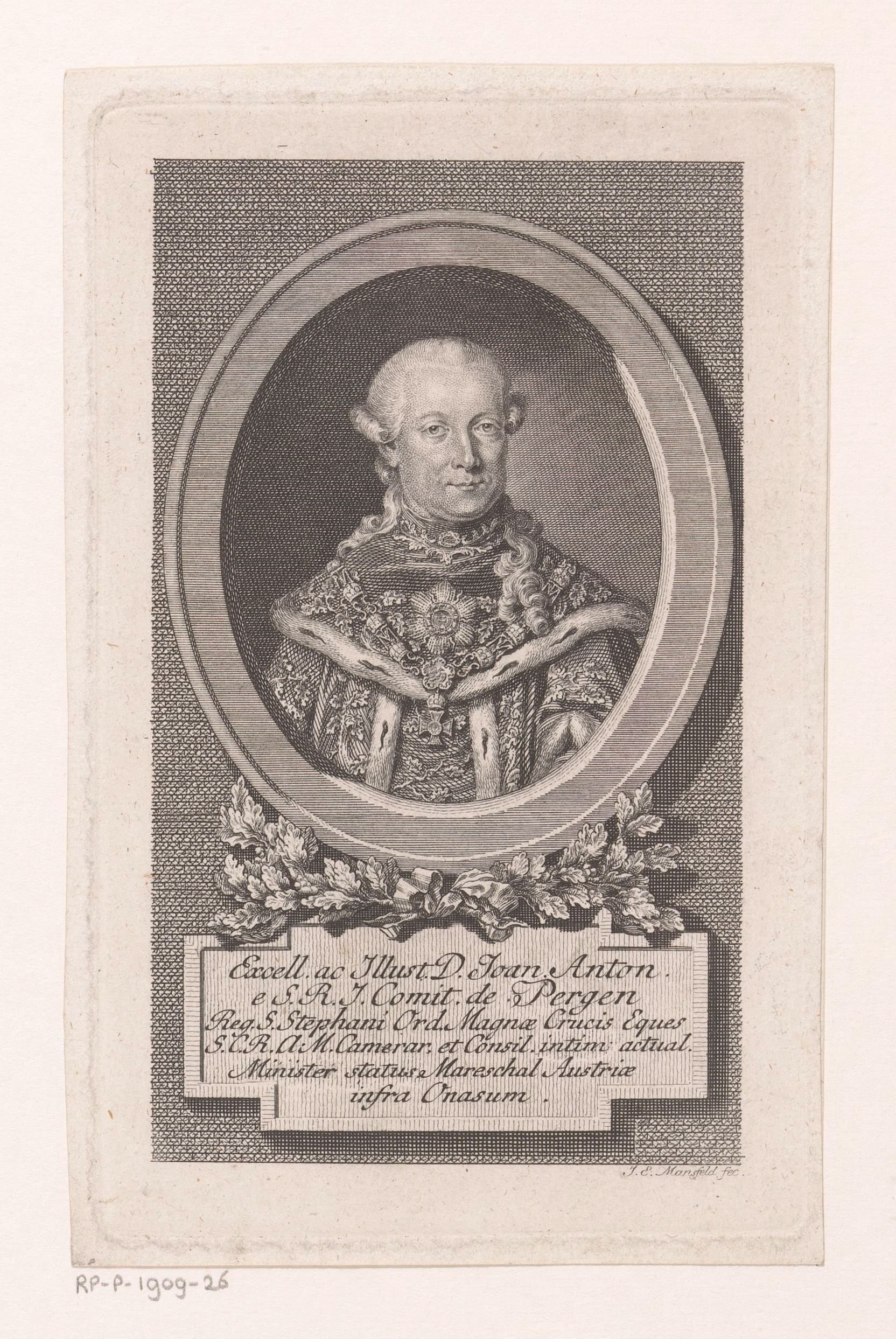
Johann Anton Graf von Pergen

Johann Anton Graf von Pergen (15 February 1725 in Vienna – 12 May 1814 in Vienna) was a diplomat and statesman of the Habsburg monarchy, serving under four consecutive monarchs for more than fifty years. He was one of the most influential individuals in the reformist administration of Joseph II (1780-1790).

As a minister of state, his accomplishments included the modernization of higher education and the suppression of ecclesiastical influence. He was also responsible for the new police organization which ensured the implementation of Joseph's radical ideas. The police force was centralized and he also developed a secret police that ensured no effective opposition. Though replaced by Joseph Sonnenfels under Leopold VII (1790-1792), he was again in charge of suppressing opposition under Francis II (1792-1835).

== Early life ==
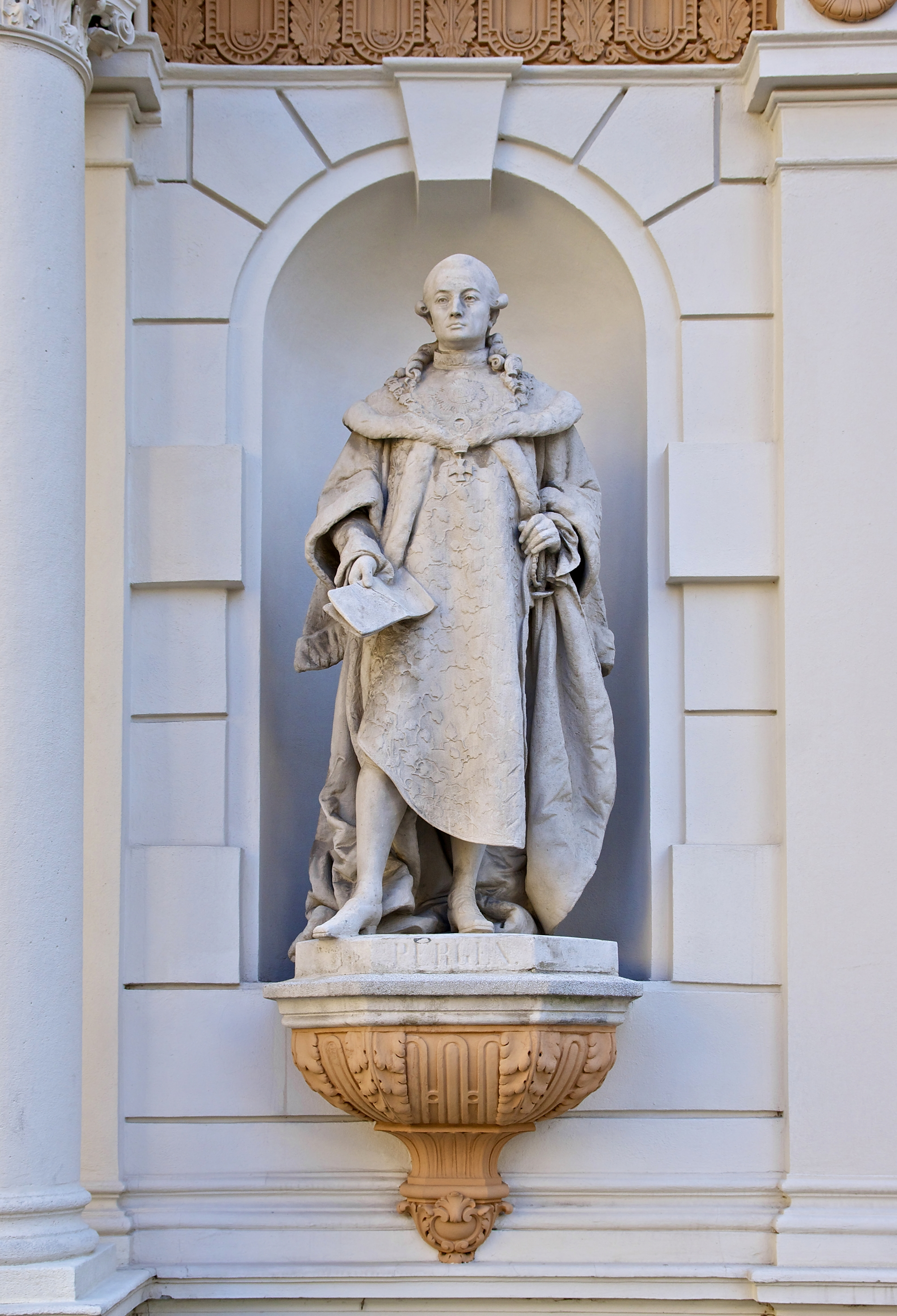
Statue of Von Pergen, at the Minoritenplatz

The Von Pergen family originated from the Habsburg Netherlands and migrated to Austria in the sixteenth century. Von Pergen's father, Johann Ferdinand Wilhelm von Pergen, was a Justice official with the Government of Lower Austria in Vienna. His mother was Maria Elisabeth (née Baroness Orlick von Laziska). One of his brothers was Johann Joseph von Pergen, Bishop of Mantua (1770–1807). He married Philippine Gabriele, a daughter of the president of the Imperial Chamber Court, Philipp Karl von Groschlag, and former lover of the future emperor, Joseph II when living in Frankfurt am Main, before moving to Vienna. Their son, Joseph von Pergen, was a vice-president of the exchequer. They also had three daughters.

Von Pergen himself led a lavish lifestyle and was a patron of the arts, and in 1782 acquired the Schloss Pottenbrunn whose park he embellished with romantic buildings.

== Early career ==
Educated by Jesuits, he then studied law. After graduating in 1747, he became secretary of the imperial embassy in Mainz. He then served at the embassy in the United Kingdom, before resuming his post in Mainz. In 1750 he was assigned to accompany the British minister Richecourt on his diplomatic trip to Germany as a companion. A short time later he was called to Vienna in 1751 and appointed by Maria Theresa (1740-1780) as treasurer to the Archdukes Karl and Leopold (later Leopold VII).

In 1753 he was imperial envoy to Mainz. His responsibilities included diplomatic relations with the other Rhineland Electors and the Imperial circles. On the occasion of the election of the Burgrave of Friedberg, he successfully mediated between the Protestant and Catholic Knights. In the election of the provost of the abbey of Ellwangen in 1756 he served as the Imperial Commissioner. In the same year he was again imperial envoy to Mainz.

During the Seven Years' War he administered the Prussian-occupied territories in the West between 1757 and 1763. He was president of the Imperial occupation administration in his capacity as minister plenipotentiary of the Lower Rhenish-Westphalian Circle. He also served at several German courts as imperial commissioner. With the royal election of 1763/64 he was the second choice of imperial ambassador.

== Later career ==
In 1766, he served under Georg Adam von Starhemberg, as Second Minister of State, Member of the State Council (Staatsrat) and Vice Chancellor.

From 1766 he also served as Kaunitz' deputy foreign minister. With regards to imperial policy Pergen stood in opposition to Kaunitz, whose policies represented an expansive development of the role of the Habsburg monarchy. Pergen had a good knowledge of the estates of the realm from his time in Mainz and other embassies, and warned against a single policy for Austria. In 1766 he wrote a memorandum on the importance of the imperial crown for the House of Austria. In this he argued that the Emperor (Joseph) should demonstrate Liebe zu Teutschland, and advised him to "defend the System with all [...] possible strength." This advice was not heeded by the Emperor. Aug 1770 On the urgency of removing Jesuits Pergen wrote, "..... Lay teachers immediately replace all Jesuits and other clerics, before the latter inflict more cultural damage on future generations".

In 1770 Pergen was mainly responsible for education reform, under which the state itself should take responsibility for the school system. In contrast the clergy would lose its role in teaching and be replaced by laity, or at least secular priests. In addition, most subjects in the secondary schools would be taught in German. The schools would develop curricula, and teacher training should be established. This would be financed from an endowment fund. This was anti-clerical and represented the reforms of the Enlightenment, which proved difficult to implement in the face of resistance from Maria Theresa and conservative-minded circles in the court.

Between 1772 and 1774 he was Governor of the areas acquired in the first partition of Poland, in parts of Galicia (Kingdom of Galicia and Lodomeria), working with the local Polish nobility.

== Organization of police ==
In 1775 Pergen became Landmarshall (Oberslandmarschall) for Lower Austria, till 1780. After the organizational reforms of Joseph II, he was a member of the Lower Austrian government from 1782. He was also Head of Police, and therefore responsible for public safety in Vienna.

He also had the job of introducing a state police in all the provinces and to reform the prison system. Pergen wanted to unify the system of internal security in the hereditary lands in a centralized and modernized form. He emphasised the role of discipline, based on the French model. The Emperor originally wanted him to just organise the secret police, while the responsibility for the rest of the police would fall to the Chancellery (Hofkanzlei). As Joseph's unpopularity increased he came to rely more and more on Pergen who hired more agents. In addition he controlled the Kabinettskanzlei which guarded the secrecy of state correspondence. He was able to use this for his own espionage and had all suspicious mail directed there.

In the larger cities police departments were already established, where subsidiary directories were established with Vertraute (secret agents). Spies and agent provocateurs listened for discontent. The secret police were to act independently of the administration, being accountable only to the head of state. His goal of a central, independent police administration was realised by 1789, by which time he was a Minister of State with an appropriate department to administer. The Vienna Police Chief's Directorate was now under the police department of the province. This role gave Pergen considerable power and influence with the emperor. In 1791, when Leopold had become emperor, he retired due to an eye condition.

== Counter revolutionary ==
In 1793, after recovering from his eye condition he was recalled as Minister of Police by Francis II. An opportunist, he had no problems with switching allegiances from enlightened absolutism to serving the new anti-enlightenment emperor. He re-introduced the centralized police system as it had existed under Joseph II. In 1801, he was also responsible for censorship and from then on Francis II and his successors would receive the latest police reports every morning.

Pergen worked on the theory that state order was best preserved by vigilance against conspiracy. Even the outbreak of revolution in France was explained by him as a conspiracy. In particular he saw Freemasons as a danger to the state. Due to the fear of a spillover of the French Revolution to Austria, he advocated monitoring the population even more meticulously. Changes to extend the powers of the police were not made public, but only made in Cabinet regulations or secret instructions to the competent authorities. This period was to see even tighter censorship, and monitoring of foreigners and Jacobin or liberal tendencies.

Pergen laid the foundations by his organization, for Josef von Sedlnitzky during the era of Metternich from 1814 to 1848, to pursue his antiliberal policies. He finally retired in 1804.

== Honors ==
For his services he was awarded the Großkreuz des Königlich-Ungarischen St. Stephansordens in 1788. At the former Lower Austrian governor's office in Vienna is a memorial by Josef Kassin (1897).

== Bibliography ==
- Paul P. Bernard: From the Enlightenment to the Police State. The Public Life of Johann Anton Pergen. Chicago, 1991
  - Review J Mod Hist
  - D Beales Review German History 1993
- Peter Fuchs: Pergen, Johann Anton Graf von. In: Neue Deutsche Biographie 20 (2001), p. 185 ff.
- Constant von Wurzbach: Biographisches Lexikon des Kaisertums Österreich. Teil 22 Wien, 1870 p. 1-4
