= Homosexuality and Citizenship in Florida =

Anti-homosexual propaganda pamphlet from the FLIC

- The "Purple Pamphlet"
- Language: English
- Genre: LGBTQ
- Publisher: Florida Legislative Investigation Committee (FLIC)
- Publication date: 1964
- Publication place: United States

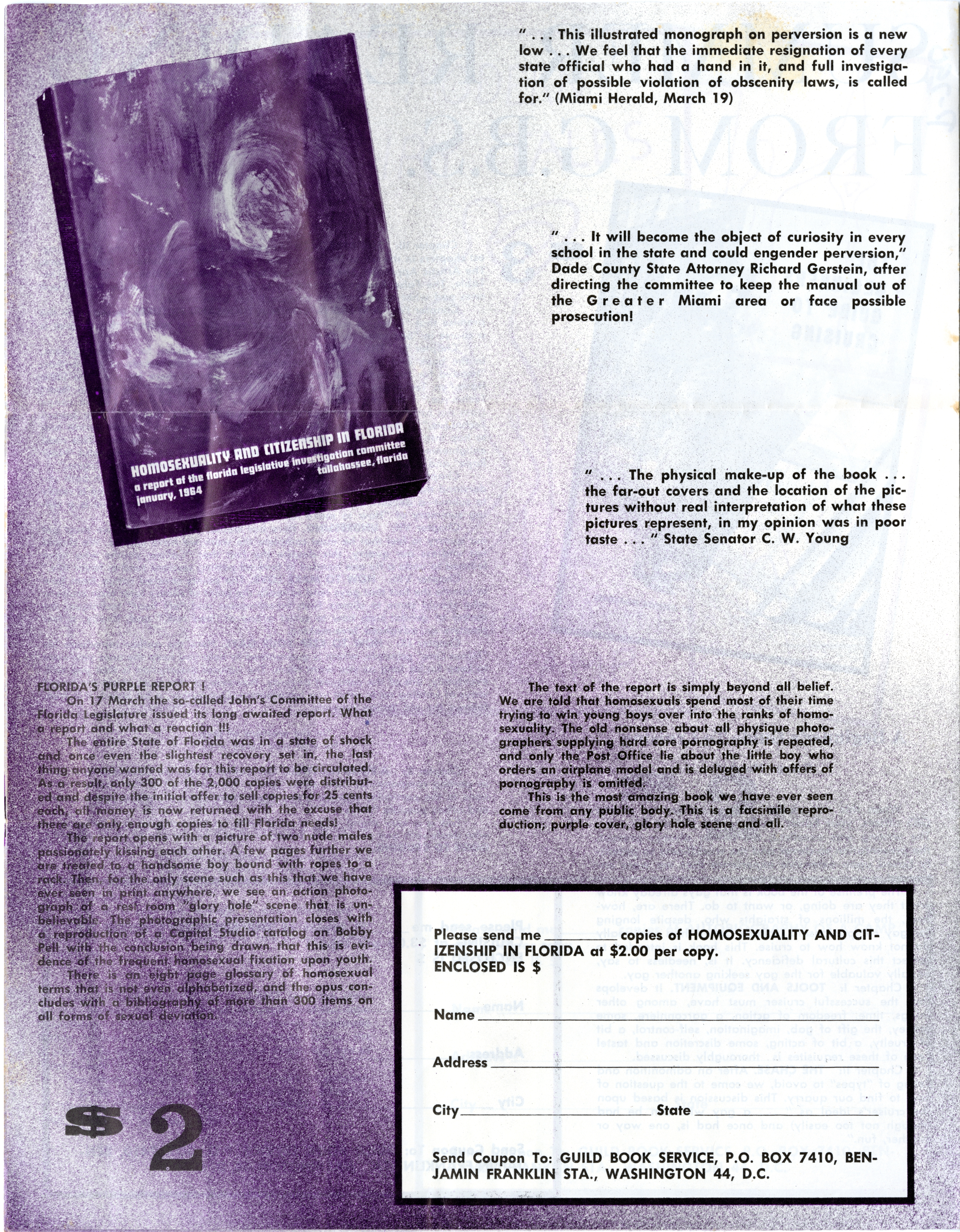
Advertisement for the Purple Pamphlet by Guild Press, a publisher of homosexual erotica

Homosexuality and Citizenship in Florida, also known as the Purple Pamphlet, was an anti-homosexual propaganda pamphlet published in January 1964 by the Florida Legislative Investigation Committee (FLIC) of the Florida Legislature led by State Senator Charley Johns. The booklet contained several pornographic images and a glossary of terminology used in the gay community. It was sold for 25 cents a copy, with a discount for bulk orders of 100 copies or more.

The Johns Committee had for several years conducted a witch hunt for homosexuals in public schools, universities, and state government agencies, believing they were part of a Communist strategy to "subvert the American way of life by controlling academic institutions and by corrupting the nation's moral fiber." By publishing its findings, the Committee hoped to persuade the Legislature to enact comprehensive anti-homosexual legislation, and to "shock Floridians into accepting its program."

[The report] viewed homosexuals as the carriers of a degenerative disease that posed a greater menace to society than child molesters. [...] The committee expected readers to select a theory conforming to its own views, and the pamphlet portrayed gays as sex fiends who spent every free moment searching for anonymous partners, recruiting youth, or transmitting venereal diseases.

Instead of becoming a best-seller as its authors hoped, the Purple Pamphlet provoked a backlash of criticism for its explicit photographs of gay men involved in sexual activities. A Dade County official threatened to bring legal action against the committee, and the Florida Attorney General "warned the FLIC to cease distribution of this 'obscene and pornographic' material." A gay book club in Washington, D.C., sold reprints of the pamphlet for two dollars apiece.

The backlash from the pamphlet controversy destroyed the committee, which disbanded on July 1, 1965, after the Legislature refused to continue to fund its activities. The records of the FLIC's investigations were sealed by the Legislature until 2028, although in the early 1990s, redacted copies were placed in the Florida state archives for public inspection.

== See also ==
- Lavender scare
- LGBTQ rights in Florida
- Save Our Children
