= Robert B. Patterson =

American football player (1921–2017)

- Born: December 13, 1921; Clarksdale, Mississippi, U.S.
- Died: September 21, 2017 (aged 95); Carrollton, Mississippi, U.S.
- Occupations: Executive Secretary, Association of Citizens' Councils of Mississippi
- Known for: Founder of the Citizens' Councils, 1954

Robert Boyd "Tut" Patterson (December 13, 1921 – September 21, 2017) was an American plantation manager and former college football star who is known for founding the first Citizens' Councils, a white supremacist organization, established in Indianola, Mississippi in 1954, in response to the Brown v. Board of Education decision. In 1966 he helped found Pillow Academy, near Greenwood.

As a boy in Clarksdale, he was close friends—"playing, fishing, hunting, wrestling"—with Aaron Henry, who grew up to become a founder of the Regional Council of Negro Leadership, the Mississippi Freedom Democratic Party, the Council of Federated Organizations and the Mississippi branch of the NAACP.

Patterson graduated from the Mississippi State College School of Agriculture in 1943. At 17 he hitchhiked from Clarksdale to Starkville to try out with the Bulldogs, "hoping to earn a scholarship to play football and study farming." He failed in the tryouts as a center, but when placed as an end he succeeded so emphatically that he was awarded a four-year scholarship. He was on the 1940 Orange Bowl championship team, the only undefeated team in the school's history. In 1942 he was made captain. That year he played in the Blue-Gray College All Star game and was selected as an All Southeastern Conference end. He was named to the MSU Sports Hall of Fame in 1995.

At Mississippi State he was a founding father to the Epsilon Epsilon chapter of Alpha Tau Omega. He was a member of Alpha Zeta agricultural fraternity as well as ROTC and the honors clubs Phi Eta Sigma, Blue Key and Omicron Delta Kappa, and was president of the school's athletic society the M-Club in his senior year.

Patterson was a veteran of World War II, at 24 attaining the rank of major. He was a paratrooper with the 82nd Airborne Division. He made 16 parachute jumps, including into Normandy, and fought with General James M. Gavin in the Battle of the Bulge. The 82nd Airborne was one of the first American occupying troops in Berlin; Patterson was appointed Division Provost Marshal for Berlin by General Gavin, who later played an important part in integrating the Army.

In the 1950s, Mississippi's State Department of Education, along with a number of civic organizations such as the Farm Bureau Federation, Mississippi Economic Council, the Sons and Daughters of the American Revolution, and the American Legion all lobbied vigorously for a robust defense of segregated schools. Since the founding of Mississippi's public education system in the 1870s, white students attended much better funded and organized schools while African Americans had few choices but to attend hopelessly underfunded and poorly equipped schools. The National Association for the Advancement of Colored People (NAACP) began a legal strategy that bore fruit by 1954. Several state challenges to dual schools or Jim Crow school systems, as they were called in the former Confederate states, reached the U.S. Supreme Court under the heading Brown v. Board of Education, Topeka, Kansas. In 1954, a 9-0 majority decision struck down a long standing legal precedent in which "separate but equal" schools made segregation consistent with the U.S.Constitution (especially components of the Fourteenth Amendment's equal protection clause). The decision mostly affected the Deep South states and a few midwestern ones as the Court declared that "segregation has no place in public education." As states scrambled to unify racially separate schools, many Deep South states such as Mississippi sought delay and obfuscation, oftentimes condemning the Court for foisting integrated public education onto a public that ostensibly did not want it. Yet prominent citizens in civic organizations as well as in the agricultural economy such as Patterson made sure the "all deliberate speed" to unify schools in the Court's decision would be delayed indefinitely.

In Sunflower County, Mississippi near Indianola, and acting on a local judge's call for organized resistance to the Brown decision, Patterson formed the state's and region's first Citizens' Council on July 11, 1955. Nearly 100 towns-folk met that evening and decided on a plan to resist implementation of any federal judiciary rulings to integrate local Sunflower County and Indianola schools. In the meantime, state leaders in Jackson sought legal relief from the Court's decision and had already implemented a plan to build up Black schools so as to ward off any ruling by the federal judiciary, arguing that the improved newer schools truly made public education equal among whites and Blacks in Mississippi.

Patterson's initial meeting in July of 1955 touched off a brief, but region wide movement of white supremacists. Citizens' Councils sprang up quickly across Mississippi, Louisiana, Tennessee, Arkansas, eastern Texas, Alabama, Georgia, Florida, and South Carolina. The organization took as its motto the slogan "States' Rights/Racial Purity" that appeared on signs, billboards, pamphlets, letter heads, and member regalia. Membership typically followed Patterson's example, and came from the ranks of the South's upper crust of attorneys, judges, lawmakers and other civil servants, but also heads of agricultural industries, automobile dealers, accountants, teachers, university professors and administrators, engineers, scientists, and administrators. Because of its middle class membership, many critics began calling the White Citizens' Councils organization the "uptown Klan." Citizens' Councilors sought more peaceful organized resistance to integrated schooling mandated by the courts when compared to the Ku Klux Klan's tactics. The latter preferred murder, arson, bombings, and terroristic campaigns, while the Citizens' Councils relied on economic intimidation.

Following the Court's Brown decision, a number of African American parents began registering their children in Mississippi's white schools. While Klan members harassed, threatened, and even ran whole families out of town in retaliation, Councilors applied "economic intimidation." Any Black parent registering their children for white school admission faced being fired from their jobs, having loans called in, and evicted from their homes. Patterson led this effort in Mississippi's state chapter of the White Citizens' Councils. As an early organizer, he served the White Citizens' Councils organization as a fund raiser, speaker, treasurer, and public relations associate. In the 1960s, Patterson formed the nucleus of a team that produced its own newspaper, The Citizen, and a television-style program, Forum, that was designed to resemble the evening news. Each of these communications techniques broadcast Council ideology of strict racial segregation, white supremacy, and Black inferiority. The communications tools spread virulent racial stereotypes about African Americans while selling the wonders of a segregated society as having few if any problems associated with race relations. Patterson was also instrumental in sending speakers such as African American Manning Johnson to northern venues to proclaim that African Americans enjoyed segregated society. The Councils were insistent that integration was being forced onto Mississippians and southerners because of a conspiracy of international communism, the American Left, and Zionist activists, maintaining that African Americans were mere "dupes" caught into a web of intrigue and deception. The Councils' media relations department and Patterson also used their communications tools such as the newspaper and Forum television program to applaud South African apartheid.

The White Citizens' Councils claimed some 2 million members between 1959 and 1960, although the organization never made its membership rolls public to confirm that number. Membership was pervasive in Deep South states, and also enjoyed vigorous membership in North Carolina, Virginia, and Kentucky, especially as desegregation contests in local areas increased attention on the school integration crisis. The Councils proved violent in many hot spots where desegregation attempts occurred such as in Little Rock in 1957 to 1960, New Orleans in 1960 and 1961, in Clinton, Tennessee in the same years. Alabama and New Jersey Councilors moved into Clinton, Tennessee to exploit the school desegregation attempts there, even threatening to bomb the school if Black students entered. Governor Frank Clement even sent in 600 National Guard troops to keep order. In the Little Rock example, angry whites beat white and Black journalists trying to report on the school crisis there, and many were Council members that organized the counter protest in 1957 outside of Central High. Governor Orval Faubus then ordered the school to violate a federal court order that touched off a state-federal issue that resolved only after President Dwight D. Eisenhower sent in U.S. Army troops and federalized the Arkansas National Guard to restore order. In New Orleans, Councilors organized a group of angry parents who called themselves "the Cheerleaders" to oppose the admission of Black student Ruby Bridges at Frantz Elementary School (Bridges had to have federal protection for her entire first grade year). New Orleans Councils also organized what was called the "high school riot" in which white high school students disrupted traffic downtown and attacked the mayor's office, destroying property and screaming racial epithets.

Each of these school desegregation attempts caused crises before 1961, and Patterson and the Mississippi Councils used their newspaper and Forum television program to exploit the violence oftentimes caused by segregationists and not the Black students hoping to desegregate a local white school. In other words, Patterson helped craft a media message to Mississippians that if schools integrated or even allowed some token desegregation, then the result would be uproar, violence, and instability that would invite federal authority to come in and rule the white people of the state in a tyrannical fashion. In keeping with his ideas about state-federal power and the limits therein, Patterson also joined a Councils offshoot segregationist organization in the 1960s called the Federation for Constitutional Government. Between 1955 and 1971 when Mississippi's public schools finally achieved some meaningful integration (and the state formally unified its school system), Patterson and the Councils' activities had successfully staved off desegregation for sixteen years.

== Bibliography ==
- Evers, Myrlie; Peters, William (1967). For Us, The Living. Doubleday. ISBN 978-0-87805-841-9.
