= Hugh Boren =

Mississippi politician (1898–1964)

Hugh Allen Boren (June 20, 1898 – October 16, 1964) was an assistant to Mississippi Governor Ross Barnett, a state legislator, and an investigator for the Mississippi Sovereignty Commission. In 1944, he served in the Mississippi House of Representatives.

He was born in Ratliff, Mississippi. He became a lawyer in Tupelo, Mississippi. He served as an assistant to Governor Barnett.

He touted the achievements of "Negroes" in Tupelo and downplayed any strife. He minimized the illness of Clyde Kennard, a Korean War veteran who attempted to attend the University of Mississippi. Kennard was conspired against by the Sovereignty Commission, arrested on false charges, and became terminally ill while held in state prison.
