= Ruth Perry (librarian) =

Civil rights activist

Ruth Willis Perry was an American librarian, journalist, and civil rights activist. She is known for her work with the Miami chapter of the National Association for the Advancement of Colored People (NAACP) and her stand against the Johns Committee, also known as the Florida Legislative Investigation Committee, which investigated alleged subversive actions by the NAACP.

== Early life ==
Her grandfather was a slaveholding Confederate officer, who was with Robert E. Lee at Appomattox. Her father, Francis Morris Willis, was a successful dentist, who held an interest in politics. Perry grew up in both Ithaca, New York, and Williston, South Carolina. She spent her summers in Williston but attended elementary through high school in Ithaca, where churches and schools were integrated. She had a degree in English from Converse College in South Carolina and a degree in library science from Drexel University.

== Civil rights work ==
Perry joined the local branch of the NAACP when she moved to Miami in 1945, and she later became secretary of the state branch of the NAACP. While working for the Miami NAACP, Perry helped increase the number of members in the 1950s and 1960s. As secretary of the Miami branch, she maintained the lists of members which would become a central aspect of the Johns Committees interactions with her. While working at the NAACP, Perry corresponded with Thurgood Marshall, chief counsel and director of the national NAACP Legal Defense and Educational Fund, about the 1956 Miami bus boycott and a 1956 lawsuit seeking to end segregation in Miami's Dade County.

In her role as the Florida secretary of the NAACP Perry was called three times to testify before the Johns Committee, also known as the Florida Legislative Investigation Committee. The committee investigated subversive activities and focused on communist activities within the NAACP. She was first subpoenaed in 1957. Despite threats against her from the White Citizens Council, she refused to cooperate with the committee. At the advice of Thurgood Marshall, she and the NAACP's attorney Grattan E. Graves Jr. had shipped the records to the NAACP headquarters in New York State. In 1958, Perry was again called to testify before the Johns Committee, and again refused to cooperate with their request for information about the membership. She was scolded by the Johns Committee for not providing the records and Cliff Herrell, a member of the Johns Committee, called her not fit to be a citizen of the state of Florida and fined her for contempt. Perry was subpoened a third time in 1959. This time she stated that the records were with Theodore Gibson, the president of the Miami branch, thereby supporting the NAACP's preparation for a court case before the Supreme Court of the United States. In 1963, the Supreme Court heard the case of Gibson v. Florida Legislative Investigation Committee, and Perry was questioned at length about the records and membership information held by the Miami NAACP branch. The NAACP was ultimately protected from the Johns Committee requests by the ruling from the Supreme Court.

== Journalism ==
Perry hosted a radio show and wrote newspaper columns. Her radio show on WMBM, Miami's African-American radio station, aired on Sunday afternoons starting in June 1953. As the audience grew from her broadcast, she got anonymous calls and letters who described the show as "vilifying and malicious". The many that disagreed with her broadcast assumed she was African-American and she considered if her detractors would have been angrier had they known she was white. Her radio show's final broadcast was in August 1956, and during the final episode she noted she had no respect for those who anonymously criticized others.

When the show received threats from people who wanted her silenced, The Miami Times newspaper provided her the opportunity for a regular column. Her column, 'Along Freedom's Road', ran from 1956 to 1962. Her columns called for an end to segregation, to give full equity to African-Americans rights, and denounced Klan violence and other forms of terrorism.

== Personal life ==
Perry and her husband, Walter Dean Perry, had a daughter named Caroline who was born in 1940.
