= The Mississippi Enterprise =

US newspaper

- Type: Weekly
- Publisher: Willie J. Miller
- Launched: 1938
- City: Jackson, Mississippi
- OCLC number: 15339733
- Free online archives: Chronicling America

The Mississippi Enterprise was one of two African American newspapers in Jackson, Mississippi. Arrington High worked at the paper. Publication years include 1939–1980. The paper covered lynchings and murders of African Americans. It advocated for African Americans to support African-American businesses in Mound Bayou, Mississippi, a historically African-American community founded by freed slaves. The Library of Congress has an archive of the paper.

It was one of five African-American newspapers in Mississippi in the 1950s.

== See also ==
- Jackson Advocate
