= Jack Giles Sr. =

American politician (1915–1982)

Jack Giles Sr. (November 21, 1915 – July 10, 1982) was a state senator in Alabama. He represented Madison County, Alabama. He was appointed to the Alabama Sovereignty Commission by George Wallace. He lived in Huntsville, Alabama.
