= Keitz & Herndon =

American advertising and film production company

Keitz and Herndon was an American television production company that made cartoons, advertisements, short educational films, and commercials founded in 1952 in Oak Cliff neighborhood in Dallas, Texas. Most notably they created the "Frito Kid" mascot for Fritos; and the animated television series, JOT.

== History ==
The partnership was formed by Rod Keitz (né Roderick Keith Keitz; 1927–2016), and Larry Herndon (né Lawrence Fred Herndon; 1926–2014). The firm was established in Oak Cliff in 1952; and later worked from their 4409 Belmont Avenue office in Belmont Park, Dallas.

Keitz and Herndon represented various national and Texas-based brands. They produced advertising in 1955 for Lone Star Gas; by 1956 the company worked on car sales, bus transportation, and oil ads; and in 1957 they produced ads for various food companies. Donald E. Wills joined the firm as an animation artist.

One of the former employees filmed President John F. Kennedy's visit to Texas on November 22, 1963, when Kennedy was shot and killed while riding in a motorcade.

The company partnership was honored by the Dallas Producers Association in 2008.

== Filmography ==
- "State of Alabama" (1965), a propaganda film made for the Alabama State Sovereignty Commission on the 1965 civil rights march in Alabama (ASSC project)
- "Atmosphere for Learning" (1965), for Austin College
- Animation short for the theater snack bar Dr Pepper advertisements
- JOT, a television cartoon series sponsored by Southern Baptist Radio and Television Commission that ran from 1965 to 1974, and 1980 to 1981
- Burleson Honey advertisements
- Lone Star Brewing Company ads
- "Frito Kid", the official mascot of Fritos corn chips
- Quality Dairy Company ads
