= Jackson Advocate =

Newspaper in Jackson, Mississippi

- Type: Weekly newspaper
- Founder: Percy Greene
- Founded: 1938
- Language: English
- ISSN: 0047-1704
- OCLC number: 4701538
- Website: jacksonadvocateonline.com

Jackson Advocate is an African-American weekly newspaper in Jackson, Mississippi.

== History ==
The newspaper was founded in 1938 by Percy Greene. Greene, a veteran of World War I and a Civil Rights leader in the 1940s and 1950s, was determined to make a contribution to the struggle of African-American people in the South during a time when they were severely oppressed by legal segregation and Jim Crow laws. In 1940 Greene and 30 other publishers formed a consortium of African-American newspapers to bring relevant information to black readers in the USA. That association led to the Negro Newspaper Publishers Association, which promoted coverage of injustices against and accomplishments by African Americans.

In 1978, Charles Wesley Tisdale became the owner and publisher of the Jackson Advocate, positions which he held until his death aged 80 in 2007.

== Awards ==
The paper has earned numerous awards and citations in its 68 years of service in reporting news and events in the African-American community, including the Mississippi Legislative Black Caucus Award for Excellence, the Southern Christian Leadership Conference Journalism Award, and the National Black Chamber of Commerce Newspaper of the Year. In 1988 Newsday magazine referred to the Advocate as a "national treasure".
