= Prussian Secret Police =

19th and 20th-century political police in Prussia

Prussian Secret Police Preußische Geheimpolizei

Agency overview
- Formed: 1854; 172 years ago
- Dissolved: 1933; 93 years ago

Jurisdictional structure
- Operations jurisdiction: Prussia
- General nature: Civilian police; Secret police

Operational structure
- Headquarters: Prussia

The Prussian Secret Police (German: Preußische Geheimpolizei) was the secret police of Prussia in the 19th and early 20th centuries.

== Forerunners ==
King Frederick William III founded the Königlich Preußische Polizeipräsidium zu Berlin (lit. "Royal Prussian Police Presidium") in 1809 with Justus von Gruner as its first president.

Karl Ludwig Friedrich von Hinckeldey, the Police Commissioner of Berlin, was appointed by King Friedrich Wilhelm IV in the wake of the 1848 revolutions and promoted to Generalpolizeidirektor (lit. "General Police Director") in 1854, which gave him authority outside of the Ministry of the Interior.

In 1851, Hinckeldey founded the Police Union of German States alongside representatives of the police forces of Austria, Prussia, Bavaria, Saxony, Hanover, Baden, and Württemberg, to establish police cooperation within the German Confederation. The union met at least once annually from 1851-1866 and published weekly reports to secretly disseminate information on any people or groups seen as being a threat to political stability, from the press to the Freemasons. This practice of information-sharing encouraged the other governments to establish political police divisions and surveillance networks similar to what Hinckeldey oversaw in Berlin, which included informants, undercover agents, and regular raids on press offices.

The flag of Prussia from 1892-1918.

== Reorganization under a new name ==
The Prussian Secret Police was renamed in 1933 as the Gestapo. Prussia itself was dissolved as an administrative entity following World War II.

== See also ==
- Wilhelm Stieber
