= Ney Gore =

American lawyer and legislator (1921–1976)

Ney McKinley Gore Jr. (June 30, 1921 - 1976) was a lawyer and state legislator in Mississippi and a director of the Mississippi Sovereignty Commission. He represented Quitman County in the Mississippi House of Representatives.

He was director of the Mississippi State Sovereignty Commission in 1956 and 1957. He wrote to U.S. Senator Everett Dirksen who served on the U.S. Senate judiciary subcommittee on civil rights urging him to visit Mississippi.

He married and had son Lee Gore, a lawyer, and Ney M. Gore III, a doctor.
