= Florida Legislative Investigation Committee =

Anti-Communist committee that focused on homosexuals

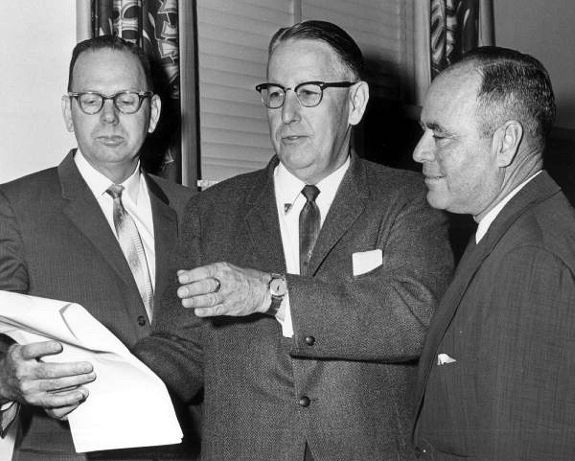
Johns Committee namesake and chairman Charley Johns (center), with B. R. Tilley (left), President of St. Johns River Junior College, and A. E. Mikell (right), superintendent of the Levy County schools, 1963

The Florida Legislative Investigation Committee (commonly known as the Johns Committee) was established by the Florida Legislature in 1956, during the era of the Second Red Scare and the Lavender Scare. Like the more famous anti-Communist investigative committees of the McCarthy period in the United States Congress, the Florida committee undertook a wide-ranging investigation of allegedly subversive activities by academics, civil rights groups, especially the NAACP, and suspected communist organizations.

After failing to find communist ties to Florida civil rights organizations, it focused on homosexuals, who were widely believed to pose a threat to both youth and national security. Students were expelled and faculty fired or forced to resign from Florida universities, especially the University of Florida.

Charley Johns, who chaired the committee, led the Pork Chop Gang, a group of rural legislators who dominated the Florida Legislature. Like many other states, Florida allotted an equal number of state senators to each county, regardless of population, just as the federal Constitution specified an equal number of senators for each state. But in 1964, the United States Supreme Court ruled in Reynolds v. Sims that electoral districts for state senators must be roughly equal in population. Thus, the Pork Chop Gang's power disappeared with reapportionment under the revised Florida Constitution of 1968.

The Sun-Sentinel reported in 2019 that the committee "persecuted civil rights leaders, university professors, college students, public school teachers and state employees for imagined offenses against redneck sensibilities.... Niceties like due process or the right to counsel or civil liberties were ignored.... They employed entrapment and blackmail." It said that the Johns Committee resembled the contemporaneous Mississippi State Sovereignty Commission, "but the Sovereignty Commission, bad as it was, lacked the Johns Committee's unrelenting cruelty". The Florida Legislative Investigation Committee has been described as Florida's version of McCarthyism and a Florida version of the House Un-American Activities Committee.

== Legislative mandate ==
Commonly referred to as the Johns Committee after its first chairman, state senator and former acting governor Charley Eugene Johns, the origins of the committee are tied to the panic caused by Brown v. Board of Education, the Supreme Court's unanimous 1954 decision that racial segregation in schools (allegedly separate but equal) was unconstitutional. Many Floridians viewed Brown v. Board of Education as "a day of catastrophe—a Black Monday—a day something like Pearl Harbor". The legislature passed a resolution declaring the Supreme Court decision "null, void and of no force or effect".

== Investigation of the NAACP ==
Johns had originally sought legislative support for a committee to investigate vice crimes. Having failed, he recast his proposed committee in response to "hysteria over the prospect of desegregation" as an investigation of the NAACP's activities in Florida. The committee's broadly worded mandate was to "investigate all organizations whose principles or activities include a course of conduct on the part of any person or group which could constitute violence, or a violation of the laws of the state, or would be inimical to the well being and orderly pursuit of their personal and business activities by the majority of the citizens of this state." Johns said he expected the NAACP would be its only target, but it quickly turned its attention to Florida Agricultural and Mechanical University, a historically black college, where faculty and students had supported the Tallahassee bus boycott of 1956–1957.

The committee sought to find communist links to the NAACP and subpoenaed Ruth Perry three times in an effort gain access to the membership records. The committee was further rebuffed when the NAACP got a ruling from the United States Supreme Court denying the Johns Committee access to their membership lists (which they had mailed out of state, for safekeeping). The committee also investigated the activities of other politically active organizations, such as the Southern Christian Leadership Conference and the Ku Klux Klan, as well as both pro-Castro and anti-Castro groups."

== Assault on homosexuals ==
Stymied in their investigation of the NAACP, the committee turned to the issue of homosexuals, specifically at the University of Florida. In 1961, the legislature directed the Johns Committee to broaden its investigations to include homosexuals and the "extent of [their] infiltration into agencies supported by state funds," particularly at the University of Florida, Florida State University, and the University of South Florida. Having the power to subpoena witnesses, take sworn testimony, and employ secret informants, the committee spread terror among the closeted lesbian and gay population in state colleges, often using uniformed policemen to pull students and professors out of classes for interrogation. Sodomy was a crime under Florida law at that time and remained so until the United States Supreme Court's Lawrence v. Texas ruling in 2003. Admission of homosexuality constituted moral turpitude and was grounds for firing or expulsion from college.

However, the Johns Committee had already begun interrogating suspected homosexual students and faculty on Florida campuses before the legislature gave specific authorization for it. In 1958, committee chairman Johns illegally sent a covert investigator to the University of Florida after his son, Jerome Johns, told his father that "effeminate instructors had perverted the curriculum." Other students identified professors as homosexuals after observing them eating lunch together or wearing Bermuda shorts on campus. Investigator Strickland hired student informants with FLIC funds, used highway patrolmen to remove professors from the classroom, and telephoned some instructors late at night, demanding that they provide testimony in Strickland's motel room at his convenience. He also prohibited the accused from confronting their complainants, seldom informed subjects of their legal or constitutional rights, and rarely offered them sufficient time to secure an attorney or prepare a defense.

Students, too, faced the committee's wrath. While faculty and staff suffered immediate dismissal if suspected of homosexuality, gay students could remain on campus only if they visited the infirmary and submitted to psychiatric treatments throughout their academic career.… The FLIC compelled personnel at the UF medical center to disclose information found in patient records and…also reserved the right to seize clinical records as it did when investigators seized paperwork on thirty-five female students who had given birth out of wedlock at the UF facility.

One victim, University of Florida honors graduate Art Coppleston, described the experience of interrogation this way:

I arrived at the University of Florida on my 25th birthday in September 1957. Having completed four years in the Air Force, I was anxious to move ahead quickly with my education, and get on to a working career. …I was called in to be interrogated three or four times during the next two years. Each time, it was the same setting, and the same set of questions. Each time I was unceremoniously marched out of class, in front of the instructor and all my classmates, by a uniformed policeman. Once this occurred during a final exam in accounting. …At each interrogation, I refused to tell them anything. Each time I was amazed that, while I was truly terrified by their tactics and their threats, I was able to stonewall their questions and refuse to give them the answers they were so desperate for. I came to realize that they, as a group, were really a very dumb bunch of redneck, illiterate people, clumsily wielding a vast amount of power over others.

The investigations ruined many lives and careers. For example, in March 1959, the chairman of the University of Florida geography department, Professor Sigismond Diettrich, a married man, attempted suicide after being interrogated by the committee's agents and then forced to resign by the university's president. In April, the university fired at least 15 faculty members and librarians. This was done in semi-secret, with no public announcement, so the students of the university had only a murky notion what was happening. Over the next year, the university continued "investigations and expulsions of students and faculty" because, to pacify the Johns Committee, it had committed itself to "legitimate self-policing".

By 1963, the Johns Committee could boast of having caused the firing of 39 professors and deans, as well as the revoking of teaching certificates for 71 public school teachers, all suspected or admitted homosexuals. Scores of students were interrogated and subsequently expelled from public colleges across the state, as well.

"Florida State University and the University of South Florida attempted to make things difficult for investigators. But the University of Florida and its president, J. Wayne Reitz, have been criticized for cooperating fully with the Johns Committee." He permitted Johns Committee uniformed investigators to come on campus and to make tape recordings of interrogation sessions with faculty and students. Many faculty were too afraid of exposure to resist the violation of their civil liberties:

The American Association of University Professors informed professors of their rights, but those who had something to fear were too afraid to ask for an arrest warrant or subpoena. Either of these would mean that their private lives could be played out for the public to read about in the newspaper.

The Johns Committee also investigated faculty at the University of South Florida, a newer university the Pork Choppers looked on with disfavor.

== Attack on academic freedom ==
The Johns Committee's investigators also interfered with academic freedom on state college campuses:

Once in Tampa [at the University of South Florida], the committee singled out faculty for allegedly picking up on male students, scheduling speeches by "known communist sympathizers," teaching evolution as fact and assigning "obscene" books of "intellectual garbage" like the classic Catcher in the Rye. …Many deans objected to the committee's activities, and local editorials blasted the report as "a disgrace" and "a shameful document." USF suspended Sheldon N. Grebstein, assistant professor of English, after the Committee denounced him for handing out "indecent" reprints of literary criticism aimed at Beat writers.

The committee's review of the University of South Florida's curriculum condemned The Grapes of Wrath and Brave New World as "trashy and pornographic". It determined that some faculty members "were not qualified to teach" because they included the theory of evolution in biology classes.

== Purple Pamphlet ==
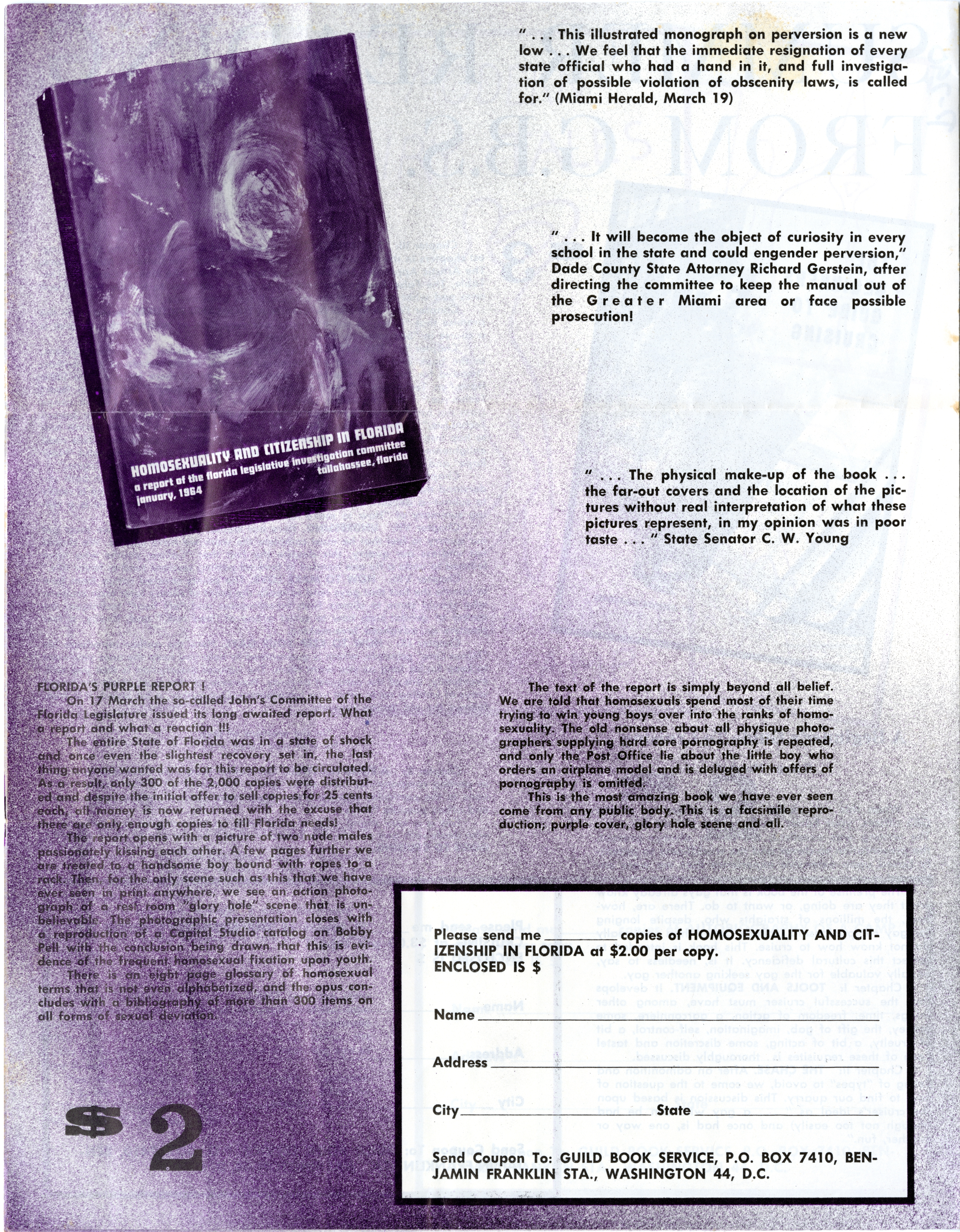
Advertisement for the Purple Pamphlet by Guild Press, a publisher of homosexual erotica

Criticism of the Johns Committee's work intensified after the 1964 publication of its report, Homosexuality and Citizenship in Florida, informally called "the Purple Pamphlet" on account of its cover, which immediately became notorious for including pictures of homosexual activity. More than 2000 copies of the report were printed, some of which were later reportedly sold as pornography in New York City. The report included such dire warnings as these:

The best and current estimate of active homosexuals in Florida is 60,000 individuals. The plain fact of the matter is that a great many homosexuals have an insatiable appetite for sexual activities and find special gratification in the recruitment to their ranks of youth. The homosexual's goal is to "bring over" the young person, to hook him for homosexuality. A veteran investigator of homosexual activities… said, "We must do everything in our power to create one thing in the minds of every homosexual and that is to keep their hands off our children. …if we don't act soon we will wake up some morning and find they are too big to fight. They may be already. I hope not." We hope that many citizen organizations in Florida will use this report… to prepare their children to meet the temptations of homosexuality lurking today in the vicinity of nearly every institution of learning.

== Disbandment and sealed records ==
Lawmakers outraged at what the media were calling "state-sponsored pornography" forbade the printing of further copies and eliminated funding for the Johns Committee at the next legislative session. The committee disbanded and ceased its work on July 1, 1965, having amassed 30,000 pages of secret documents, which were left in the custody of the legislature, to be kept sealed for 72 years. In 1993, bowing to pressure from Florida historians under the state's public records law, the legislature authorized a photocopied set of the records, with all individuals' names blacked out except those of the committee's members, staff, and public officials, to be placed the Florida State Archives. The redacted records are available for public review at the archives in Tallahassee.

== Aftermath ==
Johns remained proud of his work. In 1972 he told an interviewer: "I don't get no love out of hurting people. But that situation in Gainesville, my Lord have mercy. I never saw nothing like it in my life. If we saved one boy from being made homosexual, it was justified."

The committee's targets continued to feel its impact on their lives. When interviewed in 2000 for the documentary film Behind Closed Doors, Art Coppleston said:

I moved on to a successful and somewhat normal life as a gay man. …But, never far in the background, has lurked the shadow of Investigator Tileston and the gnawing feeling that what I am, the very essence of my being, is somehow wrong. Bad. Sinful. Unworthy. I will probably never rid myself of those feelings. But time, and the new knowledge that others know about what went on in Florida some 40 years ago, makes those feelings a lot easier to bear.

In 2019, state representative Evan Jenne and state senator Lauren Book introduced a resolution with "a formal and heartfelt apology". They did not expect immediate approval.

== Documentary films ==
In 2000, University of Florida student Allyson A. Beutke produced a half-hour documentary on the workings of the Johns Committee, Behind Closed Doors, as her master's thesis in mass communication. The film aired on PBS stations in Florida and was shown at the Tampa International Gay and Lesbian Film Festival as part of the "In Our Backyards: Florida Filmmakers" screening in October 2001. The documentary was also screened at the Florida Film Festival in Orlando during June 2002. It also aired on the Education Channel in Tampa as part of the Independents' Film Festival in July 2002. The film earned a Louis Wolfson II Media History Center Film and Video Award.

In 2011, a class of students at the University of Central Florida produced a film that continued work done by Beutke and others, entitled The Committee. It chronicles the legacy of FLIC and Charley Johns, and interviews some of the same figures from Behind Closed Doors. The documentary was nominated for two Suncoast Emmys for 2014 and was awarded an Emmy for Best Historical Documentary for 2014.

== See also ==
- Cocking affair
- Homosexuality and Citizenship in Florida
- Lavender scare
- LGBT rights in Florida
- Mississippi State Sovereignty Commission
- Alabama State Sovereignty Commission
- Louisiana State Sovereignty Commission
