= Louisiana State Sovereignty Commission =

American political organization

The Louisiana State Sovereignty Commission was a government agency of the Louisiana state government established to combat desegregation, which operated from June 1960 to 1967 in the capital city of Baton Rouge, Louisiana. The group warned of "creeping federalism", and opposed school racial integration. It allied with the Louisiana Joint Legislative Committee on Un-American Activities, and coordinated with the Mississippi State Sovereignty Commission.

== History ==
Following the Brown v. Board of Education (1954) ruling by the Supreme Court of the United States, the court declared school segregation unconstitutional. As a response to Brown v. Board of Education, Louisiana Governor Jimmie Davis created this group through the passage of state legislation. The Mississippi State Sovereignty Commission was founded in 1956, and was the organizational template for the Louisiana State Sovereignty Commission, and the Alabama State Sovereignty Commission. A former candidate for governor, Frank Voelker, Jr. had led the Louisiana group in 1962 to 1963. Sam B. Short served as the group's executive director.

The pro-segregation propaganda film A Way of Life (1961), was released for the group as part of the Louisiana: A History series, produced by Avalon Daggett. The film showed a peaceful coexistence of black and white people within the state, and features Louisiana Governor Jimmie Davis speaking on states' rights.

The group employed investigators and was prosecuted for the use of illegal wiretaps in order to victimize Wade Mackie, of the American Friends Service Committee; Irvin Cheney, the former pastor of the Broadmoor Baptist Church in Baton Rouge; and Marvin Reznikoff the Rabbi of the Liberal Synagogue. Yasuhiro Katagiri wrote in his 2009 book the records for Louisiana's group were "apparently burned" after they ceased operations.

== Legacy ==
In declassified FBI documents (through FOIA) reported in 2016, former state governor John McKeithen, with the help of the organization had privately raised money for Ku Klux Klan leaders within the state.

Archival records for the Louisiana State Sovereignty Commission can be found at the Civil Rights Digital Library at the Digital Library of Georgia, the American Archive of Public Broadcasting, and the Mississippi Department of Archives and History.

== Publications ==
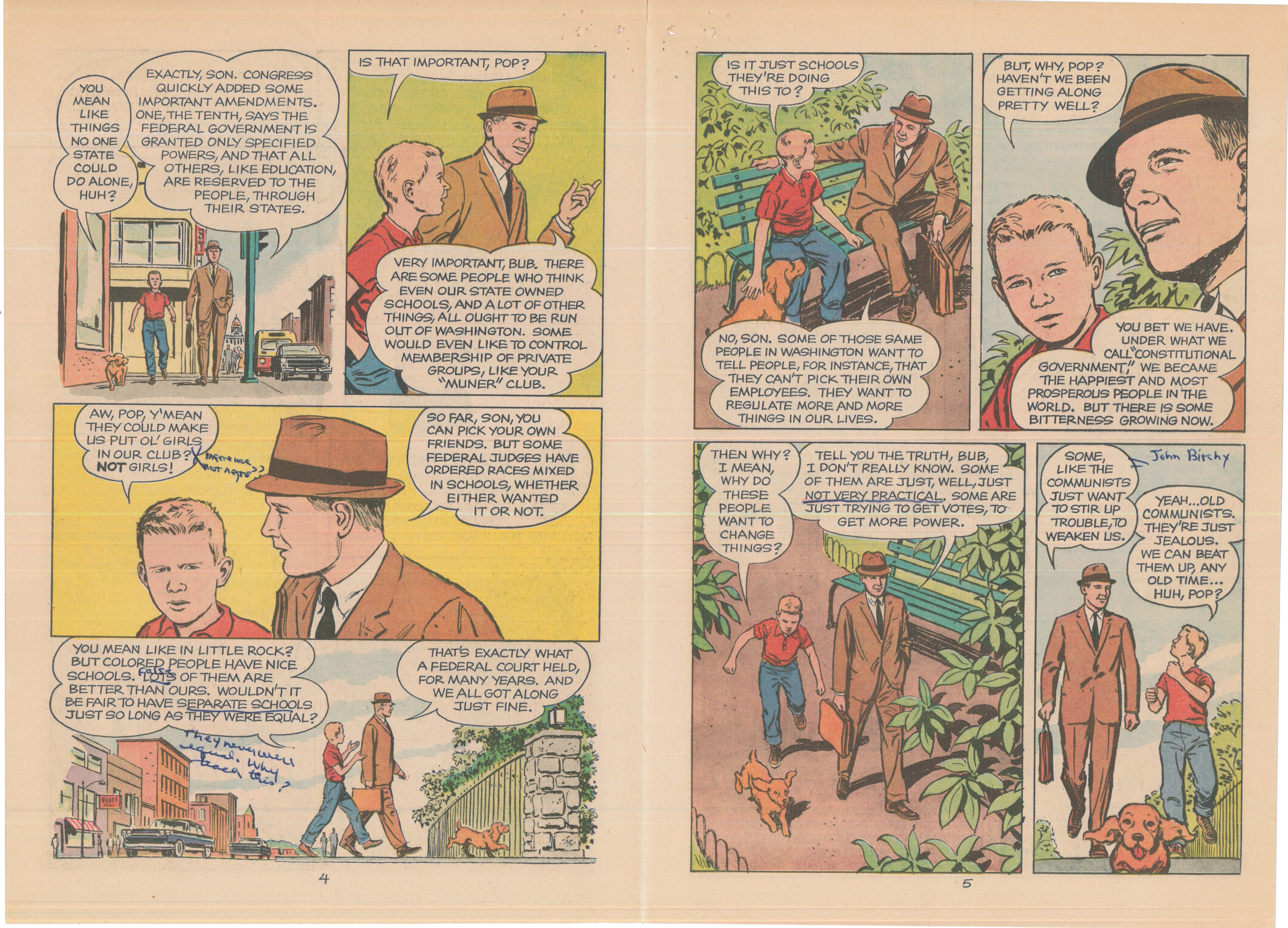
Sample of the comic book, We the People (1961)

- Don't Be Brainwashed: We Don't Have to Integrate Our Schools! (pamphlet). Louisiana State Sovereignty Commission and Louisiana Joint Legislative Committee on Un-American Activities. c. 1960.
- The Unsolid South (pamphlet). Louisiana State Sovereignty Commission.
- We the People (comic book). Louisiana State Sovereignty Commission. 1961.
- Voting Rights and Obligations; The Louisiana Program. Louisiana State Sovereignty Commission. 1962.
- State Sovereignty; Is It a Thing of the Past?. Louisiana State Sovereignty Commission. 1967.

== See also ==
- Alabama State Sovereignty Commission
- Mississippi State Sovereignty Commission
- Florida Legislative Investigation Committee
- School integration in the United States
- States' rights
- White supremacy
