= Mississippi State Sovereignty Commission =

US anti-civil rights movement state agency

- The Great Seal of Mississippi from 1879-2014.

Agency overview
- Formed: 1956
- Dissolved: 1977
- Type: Secret police, public relations
- Jurisdiction: Mississippi
- Status: Defunct

The Mississippi State Sovereignty Commission (also called the MSSC or Sov-Com) was a state agency in Mississippi active from 1956 to 1973 and tasked with fighting integration and controlling civil rights activism. It was overseen by the Governor of Mississippi. The stated objective of the commission was to "[...] protect the sovereignty of the state of Mississippi, and her sister states" from "encroachment thereon by the Federal Government". It coordinated activities to portray the state and racial segregation in a more positive light. Serving governors and lieutenant governors of Mississippi were ex officio members of the commission. The Sovereignty Commission spied on and conspired against civil rights activists and organized pressure and economic retaliation against those who supported the civil rights movement in Mississippi.

The agency was given unusual authority to investigate citizens of the state, issue subpoenas and even exercise police powers, although it was not attached to any law enforcement agency. During its existence, the commission profiled more than 87,000 persons associated with, or suspected to be associated with, the civil rights movement. It investigated the work and credit histories and even personal relations of persons under its surveillance. It collaborated with local white government officials, police officers, and business leaders to pressure and intimidate African Americans into giving up activism. The agency especially used economic pressure, such as causing targets to be fired, evicted from rental housing, or subjected to boycotts of their businesses. The Sovereignty Commission at times enacted consequences through clandestine information sharing with Citizens' Councils, private segregationist organizations that employed both economic coercion and sporadic violence. NAACP field secretary Medgar Evers characterized this partnership as creating "a secret police with huge sums of public money to spend on going around and spying on private citizens".

== Creation ==
After James P. Coleman won Mississippi's gubernatorial election in 1955, he proposed to the Legal Educational Advisory Committee the creation of "a permanent authority for maintenance of racial segregation with a full staff and funds for its operations to come out of tax money." After Coleman took office, the Mississippi House of Representatives proposed House Bill 880, which would create a State Sovereignty Commission. While most legislators and the local media were supportive of the bill, some representatives were skeptical of its power to give funds to private entities, fearing that the body would essentially become a partner of Citizens' Councils, civic groups organized to block desegregation. The House passed the bill over these legislators' objections, though the Mississippi State Senate added an amendment to the measure authorizing the Mississippi State Auditor to review the commission's expenditures. The amended bill was then passed by the House with 107 votes in support and 33 abstentions/absences. Coleman signed it into law on March 30, 1956.

== Structure ==
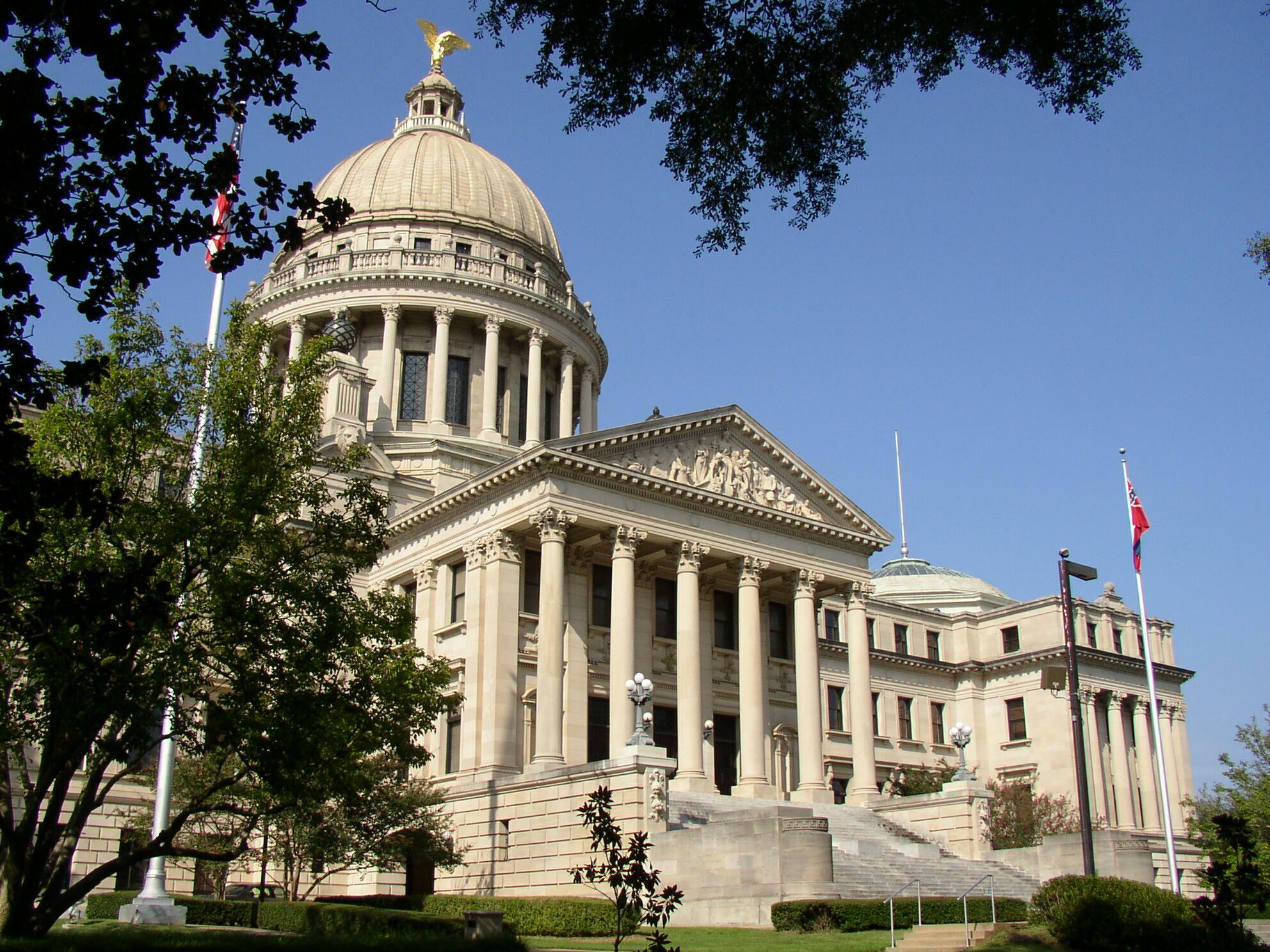
Mississippi State Capitol in Jackson, where the commission was headquartered

The Commission itself was an agency in the executive branch of Mississippi's state government. The State Sovereignty Commission comprised three divisions: executive, public relations, and investigative. The commission was led by a board of twelve members, who determined policy and reviewed its work. It comprised some ex officio members: the governor, lieutenant governor, the Speaker of the Mississippi House of Representatives, and the state attorney general; three members of the House, two members of the Senate, and three others appointed by the governor who served during the governor's term. The governor sat as the chairman of the board and appointed the agency director with the board's approval. The lieutenant governor served as the board's vice-chairman. The commission maintained its offices in the Mississippi State Capitol and retained three secretaries as support staff.

Public relations was originally the main focus of the organization, and from 1956 until 1963 the commission retained a separate director of public relations. The mission crafted for the relations division tasked it with countering negative media attention and perceptions about race relations and segregation in Mississippi. Its investigative division never had more than three full-time investigators, but the commission would sometimes employ part-time investigators or contract work out to private entities. Their job was to "obtain facts which will be of value in protecting the sovereignty of this State and preserving segregation in Mississippi." The Sovereignty Commission's first investigator was Leonard Hicks, who began his position in 1956. In 1958 Zack Van Landingham became an investigator, followed by R.C. "Bob" Thomas, State Representative Hugh Boren, Andy Hopkins, and Tom Scarbrough in 1960. Landingham was a former Federal Bureau of Investigation agent, and modeled the commission's filing system after the one used by the federal agency. Other principal investigators for the Sovereignty Commission were Virgil Downing, Leland Cole, Fulton Tutor, Edgar C. Fortenberry, and James "Mack" Mohead. Many had worked in law enforcement agencies. Their duties included special assignments from the commission director, but they also carried out routine analyses of racial incidents in the state. They frequently relied upon informants, who were sometimes compensated for their expenses or regularly as much as $500 a month.

The Mississippi State Sovereignty Commission served as an organizational template for creation of the Louisiana State Sovereignty Commission (1960–1970), and the Alabama State Sovereignty Commission (1963–1973).

=== Directors ===
- Ney Gore (1956–1957)
- Maurice L. Malone (1958–1960)
- Albert N. Jones (1960–1963)
- Erle Johnston (1963–1968)
- W. Webb Burke (1968–1973)

== Activities ==
=== Overview ===
As the state's public relations campaign failed to dampen rising civil rights activism, the commission put people to work as a de facto intelligence organization, trying to identify citizens who might be supporting civil rights initiatives, be allied with communists, or whose associations, activities, and travels did not seem to conform to segregationist norms. Swept up on lists of people under suspicion by such broad criteria were tens of thousands of African-American and white professionals, teachers, and government workers in agricultural and other agencies, churches, and community organizations. The "commission penetrated most of the major civil rights organizations in Mississippi, even planting clerical workers in the offices of activist attorneys. It informed police about planned marches or boycotts and encouraged police harassment of African-Americans who cooperated with civil rights groups. Its agents obstructed voter registration by blacks and harassed African-Americans seeking to attend white schools."

The commission's activities included attempting to preserve the state's segregation and Jim Crow laws, opposing school integration, and ensuring portrayal of the state "in a positive light." Among its first employees were a former FBI agent and a transfer from the state highway patrol. "The agency outwardly extolled racial harmony, but it secretly paid investigators and spies to gather both information and misinformation." Staff of the commission worked closely with, and in some cases funded, the notorious White Citizens' Councils. From 1960 to 1964, the commission secretly funded the White Citizens Council, a private organization, with $190,000 of state funds.

The commission also used its intelligence-gathering capabilities to assist in the defense of Byron De La Beckwith, the murderer of Medgar Evers in 1963, during his second trial in 1964. Sov-Com investigator Andy Hopkins provided De La Beckwith's attorneys with information on the potential jurors, which the attorneys used during the selection process.

In 1964, the Sov-Com passed on information regarding civil rights workers James Chaney, Michael Schwerner, and Andrew Goodman, to the conspirators in their murders during Freedom Summer. Commission agent A.L. Hopkins met with Neshoba County law enforcement and suggested the disappearance of the three young men was a propaganda ploy.

=== Coleman administration ===
During Governor Coleman's tenure, the commission was primarily deployed as a public relations agency, seeking to control activities and events which were thought to suggest that Mississippi's race relations were poor or that its citizens broke the law. He also forbade the commission from giving funds to Citizens' Councils.

=== Barnett administration ===
Ross Barnett served as governor of Mississippi from 1960 to 1964. During his tenure the commission enlarged its investigative operations, sending agents across the state to report on civil rights activities. It also surveyed literature and libraries and collected information on persons viewed to be expressing liberal ideas or violating traditional racial mores. During this time the commission also channeled money to Citizens' Councils.

=== Johnson administration ===
Millsaps College students protesting the death of Jackson State University student and civil rights worker Benjamin Brown, who was killed by police at a protest. Photo shot by the commission with numbers used to identify individual students.

Paul B. Johnson Jr. served as governor of Mississippi from 1964 to 1968. During his tenure, the agency director, Erle Johnston, owner of The Scott County Times, expanded the public relations role. He tried to form closer ties with business while monitoring proclaimed subversive groups, such as the Congress of Racial Equality, founded by James Farmer. Johnson, for his part, largely ignored the commission during his first two years as governor and did not convene any meetings of its leadership. After a requirement was attached to a state appropriations bill in June 1966 that the commission formally convene before receiving any money, the agency's leadership met on August 8, formally adopting a policy declaring the commission as a "watch dog over subversive individuals and organizations that advocate civil disobedience; as a public relations agency for the state; and as an advisor for local communities on problems resulting from federal laws or court orders." During Johnson's tenure the commission continued to monitor individuals and groups who challenged racial norms and provided advice to other government officials on ways to work around the Civil Rights Act of 1964.

=== Williams administration ===
John Bell Williams served as governor of Mississippi from 1968 to 1972. He paid more direct attention to the commission than his predecessor, regularly convening meetings of its members and typically attending them in person. Williams placed emphasis on the agency's investigative activities, appointing a former FBI agent, W. Webb Burke, as its director in September 1968 but neglecting to fill the public relations director role. In a 1971 internal report, Burke omitted any mention of public relations but summarized the commission's activities as "conducting investigations into matters of interest to the public and which matters pertain to tax supported institutions." During this time the commission followed up on requests from local officials to investigate civil rights-related activities and examined drug use and disruptions on university campuses.

== Demise and legacy ==
=== Closure of the commission ===
In the 1971 state elections, Bill Waller was elected governor and William F. Winter—a former legislator who had opposed the commission's creation—was elected lieutenant governor. At the time they took office, the commission was conducting little business. Both men demurred on making their allotted appointments to the commission and avoided attending its monthly meetings, sending representatives in their stead. After the legislature approved funding for the commission to continue in 1973, Waller vetoed the appropriation. Winter attended the commission's last meeting in June to acknowledge the suspension of funding, and the commission was effectively shut down on June 30.

Six file cabinets containing the body's records were placed in the custody of the Mississippi Secretary of State and then stowed in the underground vault of the Vital Records Center in Flora. In January 1977 a bill was introduced in the Mississippi Legislature to abolish the commission and dispose of its assets. After intense debate over what to do about the agency's records, the legislature decided to have them sealed at the Mississippi Department of Archives and History until July 1, 2027. Governor Cliff Finch signed the bill into law on March 4, and that day the secretary of state's office handed the files over to the Department of Archives and History, comprising the filing cabinets, two cardboard boxes of financial records, a meeting minute book, and two loose manila folders. Several days later a package of other records kept in the governor's office was handed over to the archives. The department locked all the relevant records in its vault.

=== Records releases ===
The year the commission's records were sealed, the Mississippi chapter of the American Civil Liberties Union filed a class-action lawsuit against the state, arguing that it should release the files, as they were compiled from illegal surveillance of citizens. In 1998, United States District Court Judge William H. Barbour Jr. ordered all commission records not involved in litigation to be unsealed, and the majority of records were made available by March 17. After subsequent court orders, the Department of Archives and History released more files on July 31, 2000 and January 18, 2001. In 2002, the department made all of the commission's records accessible on its website.

Once unsealed, the records revealed more than 87,000 names of citizens about whom the state had collected information, or classified as "suspects". Today, the records of the commission are available online for search. The records also revealed the state's complicity in the murders of Chaney, Goodman, and Schwerner at Philadelphia, Mississippi. Its investigator A. L. Hopkins gave information about the workers to the commission, including the car license number of a new civil rights worker. It passed the information to the Sheriff of Neshoba County, who was implicated in the murders.

== In popular culture ==
Dawn Porter directed the 2014 film Spies of Mississippi about the Commission.

The Commission's sealed records play a vital role in the plot of The Chamber (1996 film).

== See also ==
- Cocking affair
- Alabama State Sovereignty Commission
- Louisiana State Sovereignty Commission
- Florida Legislative Investigation Committee

== Works cited ==
- Bolton, Charles C. (2013). William F. Winter and the New Mississippi: A Biography. Jackson: University Press of Mississippi. ISBN 978-1-61703-787-0.
- Irons, Jenny (2010). Reconstituting whiteness: the Mississippi State Sovereignty Commission. Nashville: Vanderbilt University Press. ISBN 978-0-8265-1685-5.
- Katagiri, Yasuhiro (2001). The Mississippi State Sovereignty Commission: Civil Rights and States' Rights. Jackson, MS: University Press of Mississippi. ISBN 978-1-60473-008-1.
