= List of Arizona State University alumni in academia =

Arizona State University (ASU) has graduated a number of notable academics. This includes graduates and non-graduate former students who are notable for their achievements within academics, sometimes before or after their time at ASU. Other alumni, including academics in fields such as the sciences, can be found in the list of Arizona State University alumni and its partial lists.

== Academic administrators ==
Academia: Academic administrators
Name	Class year	Notability	Ref.
Catherine Dunn		President of Clarke College, 1984–2006	
Gregory Adam Haile	1999	President of Broward College, deputy chair of the Federal Reserve Bank of Atlanta	
Jay Golden		President of Wichita State University, 2019–2020	
Karl C. Leebrick	1906	President of Kent State University and Moanaolu Community Junior College	
Mark Naufel	2013	President of the University of Silicon Valley	
Harriet Nembhard	1990	President of Harvey Mudd College	
Sabah Randhawa	1983 (PhD)	President of Western Washington University	
Gary L. Rhodes		President of J. Sargeant Reynolds Community College	
Charles M. Roessel	2007 (EdD)	Photographer, journalist, president of Diné College	
Alexander F. Schilt		President of Indiana University East, University of Houston–Downtown and Eastern Washington University; chancellor of the University of Houston System	
Steadman Upham	1980 (PhD)	President of Claremont Graduate University and the University of Tulsa	
Christine Kajikawa Wilkinson		Senior vice president and secretary of the university, president and CEO of the ASU Alumni Association, inducted into the Arizona Women's Hall of Fame	
Roger L. Worsley		Educator and college president	
Safa Zaki		16th president of Bowdoin College	

== Business and economics ==
Name	Class year	Notability	Ref.
Leonard Berry	1968 (PhD)	Professor of marketing	
Trish Corner		Professor of strategic entrepreneurship	
Reza Hamzaee	1985 (PhD)	Professor of economics	
Dean T. Kashiwagi	1983 (MS), 1991 (Ph.D)	Economist and performance-based systems specialist	
Joseph R. Mason	1990	Professor of finance	
Raymond Fisk	BS, MBA, PhD	Professor of marketing	
Justin Vélez-Hagan	BS, MBA	Adjunct professor and advisor to the Virginia state government	

== Education ==
Academia: Business and economics
Name	Class year	Notability	Ref.
Janet S Gaffney	1984 (PhD)	Professor of education	
Kris Gutiérrez	1982 (MA)	Professor of education	
Jeong-Hee Kim	2000 (MAT), 2005 (PhD)	Professor of education	
Joseph C. Kush	1984 (PhD)	Professor of school psychology	
Douglas E. Lynch	1987	Professor of education	
Robert A. Reiser	1974 (MA), 1975 (PhD)	Professor of education	

== Humanities ==
Academia: Humanities
Name	Class year	Notability	Ref.
Maysoon al-Nahar	2000 (PhD)	Jordanian archaeologist	
Mark Ashurst-McGee	2008 (PhD)	Historian for The Church of Jesus Christ of Latter-day Saints	
Barbara Blackmun	1971 (MA)	Scholar of African art history	
Myla Vicenti Carpio	1995 (MA), 2001 (PhD)	Historian, author of the book Indigenous Albuquerque	
E. David Cook	1968	Professor of faith and learning	
Laura Harris Hales	2020 (MA)	Specialist in the history of The Church of Jesus Christ of Latter-day Saints	
Susan Lee Johnson	1984 (MA)	Professor of history	
J. David Markham	(MAE)	Specialist in Napoleonic history	
Valerie Matsumoto		Asian American historian	
Christopher Mott		English lecturer; played football at ASU	
Eduardo Obregón Pagán		Professor of history at ASU	
Keith W. Perkins		Professor of LDS Church history	
Lydia V. Pyne		Historian and science writer	
John Radzilowski	1999 (PhD)	Professor of history	
Jennifer Reeder		Historian for The Church of Jesus Christ of Latter-day Saints	
Larry Schweikart	1972	Conservative author and popular historian best known for A Patriot's History of the United States	
Jim G. Shaffer	1965, 1967 (MA)	Archaeologist	
Rena Torres Cacoullos	1993	Linguist	
Virginia Tufte	(MA)	Professor of English	
Arthur Unsworth	(Ed.D)	Music school dean	
Gary Varner	1980	Professor of philosophy	
Gary Witherspoon	—N/a	Professor of American Indian studies (attended)	
Emily Zarka	2018 (PhD)	Professor of English literature	

== Social sciences ==
Academia: Social sciences
Name	Class year	Notability	Ref.
Randall Amster		Professor of peace studies	
Dan Blumberg	1993 (PhD)	Geographer	
Thom Brooks		Political philosopher and legal scholar	
Mathilda B. Canter	1961 (MA)	Psychologist known as the "First Lady of Arizona psychology"	
Karma Chávez	2007 (PhD)	Chair, Mexican American and Latina/o Studies, at the University of Texas at Austin	
Raymond Dean	1978 (PhD)	Psychologist	
Matthew Desmond	2002	Sociologist	
James Price Dillard	1978 (MA)	Professor of communication	
Karla Gower	(MA)	Professor of public relations	
John Hunter Gray	1958, 1960 (MA)	Sociologist; participated in a 1963 sit-in in Jackson, Mississippi	
Kishonna Gray	(PhD)	Communication and gender studies researcher	
Annegret Hannawa	2009 (PhD)	Communication scientist	
Julia Heiman	1970	Sexologist	
Tania Israel	(PhD)	Expert in LGBTQ intervention research and dialogue across political disagreement	
Katrina Johnston-Zimmerman		Anthropologist and urbanist	
Ruth Kanfer	1981 (PhD)	Professor of organizational psychology	
Douglas T. Kenrick	1976 (PhD)	Professor of psychology at ASU	
Jon Maner	2003 (PhD)	Professor of psychology	
Daniel R. Montello	1988 (PhD)	Professor of geography	
Robert O. Pihl	(MA and PhD)	Professor of psychology	
Lyn Ragsdale	1974	Political scientist	
Irving J. Rein	(MA)	Professor of communication studies	
Christopher J. Schneider	2008 (PhD)	Sociologist	
Nevzat Soguk	1995 (PhD)	Professor of political science	
Melissa Steyn	1996 (MA)	Diversity studies scholar	
Joshua Tybur	2004	Professor of psychology	
Montgomery Van Wart	(PhD)	Professor of public administration	
Lynn Vavreck	1990, 1992 (MA)	Professor of political science	
