= Joseph Mason =

Joseph Mason may refer to:

== Sportpeople ==
- Joe Mason (footballer, born 1991) (born 1991), English footballer
- Joe Mason (footballer, born 1940) (1940–2019), Scottish former footballer

== Politicians ==
- Joseph Mason (Canadian politician) (1839–1890), merchant and politician in British Columbia, Canada
- Joseph Mason (Illinois politician), member of the Illinois House of Representatives from 1913 to 1917
- Joseph Mason (New York politician) (1828–1914), U.S. representative from New York

== Others ==
- Joseph Mason (artist) (1802–1842), American artist and assistant to John James Audubon
- Joseph Mason (settler) (1840–1881), early American settler of Colorado
- Joe Mason (aid worker) (1903–?), American Red Cross Field Director during World War II
- Joe L. Mason (1915–1974), colonel in the United States Air Force
- Joseph R. Mason, American economist
