= List of compositions by David Maslanka =

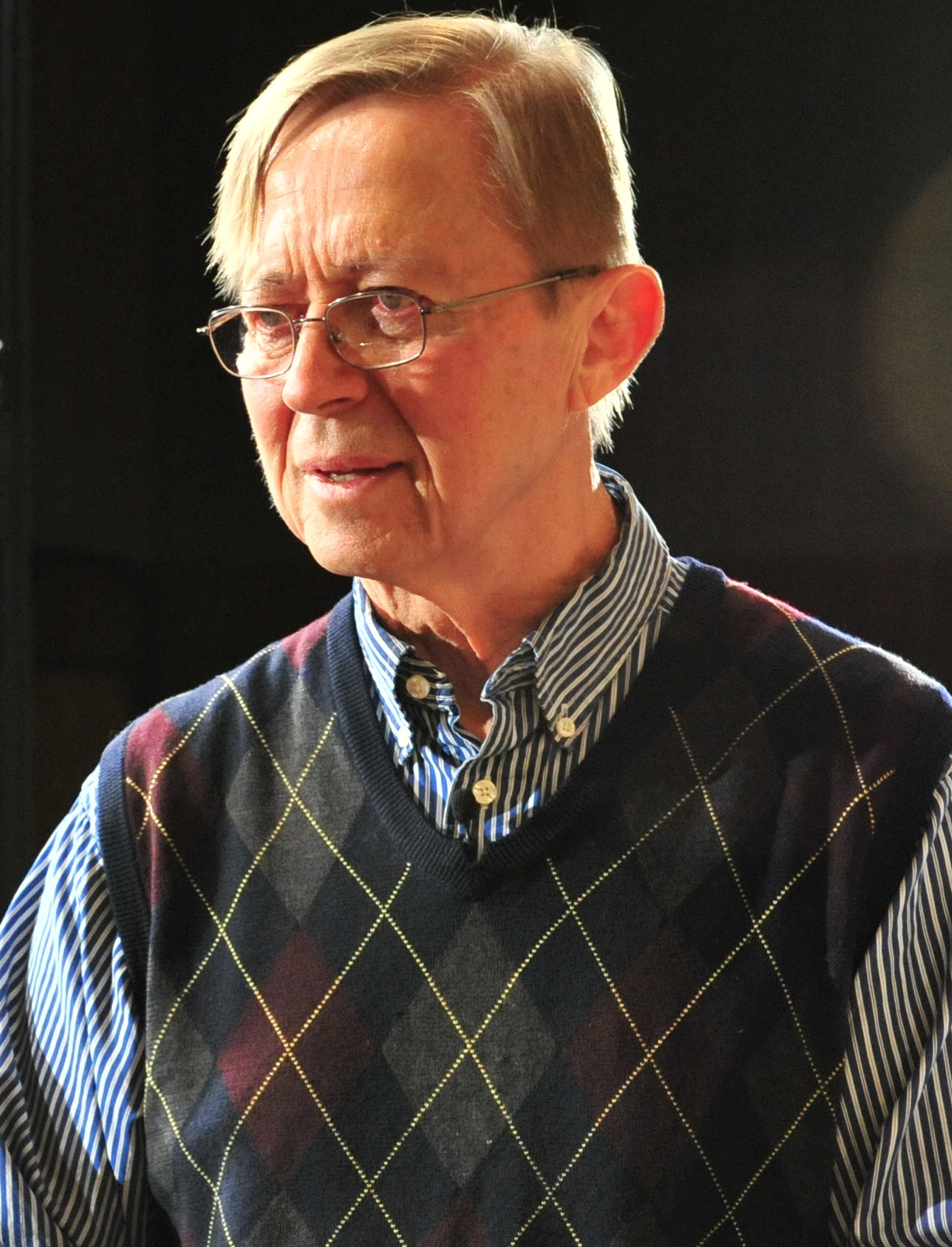

David Maslanka (August 30, 1943 – August 6, 2017) was a U.S. composer who wrote in a variety of genres, including works for choir, wind ensemble, chamber music, and orchestra. Best known for his wind ensemble compositions, Maslanka published nearly 100 pieces, including nine symphonies (seven of them for concert band), nine concertos, and a full mass.

Maslanka's works for winds and percussion have become especially well known. They include (among others) A Child's Garden of Dreams, for symphonic wind ensemble; concertos for alto saxophone, flute, clarinet, solo percussion, tenor trombone; a concerto for two horns; two concertos for piano (with winds and percussion); seven symphonies; a mass for soloists, chorus, boys' chorus, wind orchestra, and organ; and three quintets. His percussion works include Variations on "Lost Love" and My Lady White (both for solo marimba); and three ensemble works, Arcadia II: Concerto for Marimba and Percussion Ensemble; Crown of Thorns; and Montana Music: Three Dances for Percussion.

In addition, Maslanka wrote a variety of chamber, orchestral, and choral pieces.

== Wind ensemble works and concertos ==
Alex and the Phantom Band (2001), for wind ensemble and narrator. The text — written by the composer's daughter, Kathryn — introduces listeners to the various instruments of the band, somewhat after the manner of Benjamin Britten's Young Person's Guide to the Orchestra.

Angel of Mercy (2015), for wind ensemble. Premiered in January 2016 by the St. Olaf Band (Timothy Mahr, conductor) and written to mark the 125th anniversary of that ensemble. Described as "a prayer for peace in our troubled time," this piece features a prominent part for bassoon.

California (2015), for wind ensemble. Premiered in February 2016 by the California CBDA All-State Wind Symphony (Dr. Mallory Thompson, conductor) at the California All-State Music Education Conference in San Jose.

Hymn for World Peace (2014), for wind ensemble. World Premiered May 29, 2015. The title, “Hymn for World Peace,” came from the simple thought that if we want world peace, we can begin as individuals to ask for it. Music making opens hearts and creates peace in individuals and communities. This is a powerful step as musicians that we can take. Commissioned by the Clarence (NY) High School Symphonic Band and Clarence High School Band Boosters in celebration of the 50th annual Concert at Kleinhans Music Hall in Buffalo, NY.

A Carl Sandburg Reader (2007), for baritone and soprano soloists with wind ensemble. A setting of poems by the Illinois poet, songster, and biographer of Abraham Lincoln; commissioned (by the Illinois State University Office of Advancement, Illinois State University Office of Student Affairs, Illinois State University College of Fine Arts, Illinois State University School of Music, and the Illinois State University Band) in honor of the Illinois State University Sesquicentennial.

A Child's Garden of Dreams (1981), for wind ensemble with percussion, harp, piano, and electric organ. Premiered February 1982 by the Northwestern University Wind Ensemble (John P. Paynter, conductor) at Northwestern University in Evanston, Illinois. This five-movement work is based on dreams of a young girl about to die, as related in Carl Jung's book Man and His Symbols. Commissioned by John and Marietta Paynter.

Collected Chorale Settings, arranged for wind, brass, percussion, and strings.

Concerto for Alto Saxophone and Wind Ensemble (1999). Premiered March 2000 by the University of Arizona Symphonic Wind Ensemble (Gregg Hanson, conductor) with Joseph Lulloff, saxophonist. Commissioned by a consortium headed by the University of Texas at Austin and the University of Arizona.

Concerto for Marimba and Band (1990). Premiered November 1990 by the U.S. Air Force Band (Steven Grimo, conductor) with Randall Eyles, marimba soloist, at the Percussive Arts Society International Convention in Philadelphia. This pastoral music largely explores quiet moods and colors — except for one large outburst. Commissioned by the U.S. Air Force Band.

Concerto [No. 1] for Piano, Winds, and Percussion (1976). Premiered February 1979 by the Eastman Wind Ensemble (Frederick Fennell, conductor) with William Dobbins, pianist. Its three movements are technically and emotionally demanding.

Concerto No. 2 for Piano, Winds, and Percussion (2003).

Concerto for Trombone and Wind Ensemble (2007). Commissioned by a consortium of music schools headed by conductor Gary Green and trombonist Timothy Connor of the University of Miami Frost School of Music, this concerto is dedicated to the memory of flutist Christine Nield-Capote. It is scored for an ensemble of 21 wind and brass instruments, as well as double bass, piano, and percussion; and features a prominent obbligato cello part. It is in three large movements, each of an intense and song-like nature.

David's Book: Concerto for Percussionist and Wind Ensemble (2006).

Desert Roads: Four Songs for Clarinet and Wind Ensemble (2004).

Give Us This Day: Short Symphony for Wind Ensemble (2005). Comprises two movements, marked by the composer as "Moderately slow" and "Very fast." The work features a clarinet solo in the first; and oboe, flute, saxophone, and clarinet solos in the second. This short symphony takes its title from the Lord's Prayer and concludes with a Bach chorale setting of the Lutheran hymn Vater unser im Himmelreich.

Golden Light: A Celebration Piece (1990), for wind ensemble. Premiered August 1990 by the Senior Wind Ensemble of the South Shore Conservatory (Malcolm W. Rowell, Jr., conductor) at the Cohasset Music Circus, Cohasset, Massachusetts. While written for a high-school ensemble, this is a demanding study in rhythmic independence and speed, and presents a fair challenge for any wind ensemble. Commissioned by the South Shore Conservatory.

Heart Songs (1997), for young band. Premiered April 1998 by the Harwood Junior High School Symphonic Band (Christopher Ferrell, conductor) of Bedford, Texas. It was commissioned by that ensemble under Joe Gunn.

Hell's Gate (1997), for three saxophones and symphonic wind ensemble. Premiered March 1997 by the Hellgate High School Symphonic Band (John H. Combs, conductor) of Missoula, Montana. Commissioned by that ensemble under John H. Combs, this single-movement work chronicles a soul's journey.

Hosannas (2015), for wind ensemble. Premiered April 26, 2015 by the University of Miami Frost Wind Ensemble (Gary D. Green, conductor). Written as to commemorate the retirement of Professor Green at the University of Miami, and performed under his direction in a valedictory concert, this piece is in seven movements. The final movement features a tenor solo based on a poem by Richard Beale, "A Litany of Courage and the Seasons."

In Memoriam (1989), for wind ensemble. Premiered February 1990 at the Texas Music Educators Association annual conference in San Antonio by the University of Texas – Arlington Wind Ensemble (Ray C. Lichtenwalter, conductor). Commissioned by the conductor in memory of his wife, Susan, this work embraces the hymn "Wer nur den lieben Gott läßt walten" (Whoever Trusts Only in the Dear Lord to Reign).

Illumination (2013).

Laudamus Te (1994), for wind ensemble. Commissioned and premiered (in April 1995) by the Mount St. Charles Academy Symphonic Band (Marc Blanchette, conductor) of Woonsocket, Rhode Island. "Laudamus Te" (We praise You) derives its title from the Gloria of the mass. This dark piece expresses praise growing out of depression and darkness.

Montana Music: Chorale Variations (1993), for symphonic wind ensemble. Commissioned and premiered (in May 1993) by the Bishop Ireton High School Band (Garwood Whaley, conductor) of Alexandria, Virginia. Like Maslanka's "In Memoriam," "Montana Music" embodies a hymn tune (O Sacred Head) in a free-variation context.

Morning Star (1997), for symphonic wind ensemble. Commissioned and premiered (in May 1997) by the Grand Ledge High School Wind Symphony (Michael Kaufman, conductor) of Grand Ledge, Michigan.

Mother Earth: A Fanfare (2003), for wind ensemble.

O Earth, O Stars: Double Concerto for Flute, Cello, and Wind Ensemble (2010). Premiered November 18, 2010 by the Illinois State University Wind Symphony (Stephen K. Steele, conductor) with Kimberly Risinger, flutist, and Adriana La Rosa Ransom, cellist.

Prelude on a Gregorian Tune (1981), for young band. The melody of this gentle, sunny piece is derived from Gregorian chant.

Procession of the Academics (2007), for wind ensemble.

Requiem (2013), for band. Premiered by the Brooklyn Wind Symphony, Jeff W. Ball, Artistic Director, on 15 June, 2013 in New York City.

Rollo Takes a Walk (1980), for band.

Sea Dreams: Concerto for Two Horns and Wind Ensemble (1997). Premiered April 1998 by the Arizona State University Wind Ensemble (Richard Strange, conductor) with Thomas Bacon and James Graves, hornists. Commissioned by a consortium headed by Thomas Bacon.

Song Book (2001), for flute and wind ensemble. This work, a concerto in five movements, derives its title from both the intimate nature of the music and the vocal quality of the solo flute.

Symphony No. 2 (1985), for wind ensemble. Premiered February 1987 by the Northwestern University Symphonic Band and Wind Ensemble (John P. Paynter, conductor) at the national convention of the College Band Directors National Association in Evanston, Illinois. Commissioned by the Big Ten Band Directors Association.

Symphony No. 3 (1991), for wind ensemble. Premiered November 1991 at the University of Connecticut at Storrs by the Uconn Wind Ensemble (Gary Green, conductor). Commissioned by the University of Connecticut Research Council under Gary Green.

Symphony No. 4 (1993), for wind ensemble. Premiered by the University of Texas at Austin Symphonic Wind Ensemble (Jerry Junkin, conductor) in February at the 1994 Texas Music Educators Association convention in San Antonio. Commissioned by a consortium headed by the University of Texas at Austin Symphonic Wind Ensemble under Jerry Junkin.

Symphony No. 5 (2000), for wind ensemble. Commissioned by a consortium headed by Illinois State University Wind Symphony under Stephen K. Steele.

Symphony No. 7 (2004), for wind ensemble. Commissioned by a consortium headed by Illinois State University under Stephen K. Steele; and premiered March 10, 2005 by the Illinois State University Wind Symphony (Stephen K. Steele, conductor) at the Illinois State University Center for the Performing Arts in Normal, Illinois.

Symphony No. 8 (2008), for wind ensemble. Commissioned by a consortium headed by Stephen K. Steele; and premiered November 20, 2008 by the Illinois State University Wind Symphony (Stephen K. Steele, conductor) at the Illinois State University Center for Performing Arts in Normal, Illinois.

Symphony No. 9 (2011), for wind ensemble. Premiered November 17, 2011 by the Illinois State University Wind Symphony (Stephen K. Steele, conductor) at the Illinois State University Center for Performing Arts in Normal, Illinois.

Symphony No. 10, "The River of Time" (2018), for wind ensemble. Premiered April 3, 2018 by the University of Utah Wind Ensemble (Scott Hagen, conductor) at the Libby Gardner Concert Hall in Salt Lake City. The first movement and half of the second movement were completed by the composer. At the composer's urging — Maslanka would die of cancer on August 7, 2017 — his son Matthew then finished the remainder of the work based on his sketches. The second and fourth movements were completed based upon detailed sketches by the composer; the third movement, inspired by less finished sketches, was composed primarily by Matthew.

Tears (1994), for wind ensemble. Premiered October 1994 by the Intercollegiate Honor Band (Allan McMurray, conductor) at a convention in Madison of the Wisconsin Music Educators Association (WMEA). Tears is a single-movement, thirteen-minute work commissioned by the WMEA.

Testament (2001), for wind ensemble. Written in response to the terrorist attacks of 9/11, Testament is a statement of belief in the healing power of music. Commissioned by a consortium including the L.D. Bell High School Band (Joseph Grzybowski, conductor) of Hurst, Texas.

The Seeker (a symphonic movement) (2016), for wind ensemble. Premiered April 2017 by the Virginia All State Symphonic Band (Dr. Gary Green, conductor). In Buddhist tradition, the bodhisattvas are the seekers after enlightenment. It can be said that we are all seekers on this path, the path of self-understanding, of the heart of compassion, of caring for the world.

Traveler (2003), for wind ensemble. Commissioned by the University of Texas at Arlington chapters of Kappa Kappa Psi and Tau Beta Sigma.

A Tuning Piece: Songs of Fall and Winter (1995), for wind ensemble. Premiered July 1995 at the Kappa Kappa Psi National Convention by the Intercollegiate Honor Band (James Croft, conductor). Based on several hymn tunes, this is a piece about metaphorically tuning and attuning, growing out of perceptions of life after age 50. Commissioned by Kappa Kappa Psi.

UFO Dreams: Concerto for Euphonium and Wind Ensemble (1998). Premiered March 1999 by euphonium soloist Matthew Maslanka and the Hellgate High School Wind Ensemble (John H. Combs, conductor) of Missoula, Montana, on a commission by that ensemble. The three-movement work's title puns upon the name of the solo instrument.

Unending Stream of Life: Variations on "All Creatures of Our God and King" (2007), for wind ensemble. Commissioned by the Sacred Wind Ensemble (Dr. Scott Bersaglia, conductor).

Variants on a Hymn Tune (1994), for euphonium and young wind ensemble. Premiered February 1995 at the Music Educators National Conference Northwestern Convention in Spokane, Washington by the composer's son Matthew, as euphonium soloist, with the Missoula All-City Winds (John Schuberg, conductor), on a commission by that ensemble.

== Orchestral works ==
11:11 – A Dance at the Edge of the World (2001), for orchestra. This single-movement, sixteen-minute work grew out of the composer's persistently seeing the time 11:11 on digital clocks.

A Child's Garden of Dreams: Book II (1989), for large orchestra. This four-movement work was inspired by the dreams of a young girl as reported by Carl Jung in his book Man and His Symbols. Its premiere was given by the Appalachian Symphony Orchestra (in Boone, North Carolina) at the Hayes School of Music on Dec. 7, 2008.

Concerto for Alto Saxophone and Orchestra (2008). A transcription by the composer of his 1999 concerto scored for wind ensemble.

Death and the Maiden (1974), chamber opera in three scenes. Story by Ray Bradbury, Libretto by John A. Wiles, Jr. Never staged, this work instead became a source of music for a number of the composer's other pieces.

In Lonely Fields (1998), for seven percussionists and orchestra. Commissioned by the Robert Hohner Percussion Ensemble of Mt. Pleasant, Michigan.

Music for String Orchestra (1992). Commissioned and premiered (in May 1992) by the String Orchestra of the Rockies, in Missoula, Montana. This three-movement work runs some seventeen minutes in duration.

Symphony No. 1 (1970), for orchestra.

Symphony No. 6, "Living Earth" (2003), for orchestra. Comprises five movements with the following subtitles: I. Living Earth (1); II. Rain; III. November: Geese on the Wing; IV. Dreamer; and V. Living Earth (2). Commissioned by James Allen Anderson and the Rho Tau chapter of Phi Mu Alpha Sinfonia for the Appalachian Symphony Orchestra (Boone, North Carolina).

World Music, for orchestra.

== Choral works ==
'City Tree (1973), for women's chorus SSAA and harp. This setting of a poem by William Matheson premiered in May 1973 by the Women's Chorus of the State University of New York at Geneseo.

Collected Chorale Settings, for mixed chorus SATB.

Four Lullabies, for women's chorus SA and piano. With Barberi Paull.

The Four Seasons, for mixed chorus SATB. With Barberi Paull.

Hear My Prayer O Lord (Psalm 102), for chorus and piano. This energetic and joyful Psalm setting is written for two-part choir, either men or women.

The Hungry Heart (1997), for mixed chorus SATB. Commissioned and premiered (in December 1997) by the University of Montana Chamber Chorale (Gary Funk, conductor) in Missoula, Montana.

I Wake and Feel the Fell of Dark (1977), for mixed chorus SATB. Premiered May 1977 under conductor Robert Isgro by the Chamber Singers of the State University of New York at Geneseo. A setting of the dense, dark poem by Gerard Manley Hopkins.

Liberation (2010), for chorus and symphonic wind ensemble. Premiered March 14, 2010 at the Okazaki Japanese Wind Ensemble Conductors Conference. The American premiere followed on April 18, 2010 by the Illinois State University Symphonic Winds (Stephen K. Steele, conductor).

A Litany for Courage and the Seasons (1988), six songs on poems of Richard Beale for chorus, clarinet, and vibraphone. Premiered April 1988 by the University of Connecticut Concert Choir (Peter Bagley, conductor). Commissioned by Robert Isgro and the Geneseo Chamber Singers.

Mass (1996, rev. 2005), for SATB chorus, boys' chorus, soprano and baritone soli, organ, and symphonic wind ensemble. Premiered April 1996 at St. Thomas the Apostle Church, Tucson, by the University of Arizona Wind Ensemble (Gregg Hanson, conductor). A complete setting (in Latin) of the mass, intercut with solo songs on poems of Richard Beale. Commissioned by a consortium headed by the University of Arizona Wind Ensemble under Gregg Hanson.

The Nameless Fear, or, The Unanswered Question Put Yet Another Way (1973), for mixed chorus SATB, speakers, harpsichord, guitars, flute, bassoon, and percussion. Premiered March 1973 by the Chamber Singers of the State University of New York at Geneseo (James Walker, conductor).

The One and Only Book of Madrigals, for mixed chorus SSATB and SATTB.

Seven Lyrics From Sappho, for mixed chorus SATB. The composer writes that this was "written as an experiment while I was composing [my] Quintet No. 1. Each morning as a warm-up, I would sit and write an entire brief choral movement, not getting up until the movement was finished."

== Solo and chamber works ==
Anne Sexton Songs (1977), for mezzo-soprano and piano. Three songs after the American poetess, premiered by singer Sheila Allen in July 1977 at Tanglewood.

Orpheus (1977), for two bassoons and marimba. Programmatic work depicting Orpheus' descent into the underworld to rescue Eurydice.

Music for Doctor Who (1979), for bassoon and piano. A short work written for bassoonist John Steinmetz, utilizes multiphonics. This work depicts a particular scene of an episode of Doctor Who where The Doctor, portrayed by Tom Baker, escapes confinement by pretending to electrocute himself. A clip of the scene is available on David Maslanka's website

Arcadia, for cello quartet. A single-movement work which, the composer says, "was pronounced too difficult by the people for whom I wrote it, and … has never been performed."

Mountain Roads (1998), for saxophone quartet. Commissioned and premiered (in November 1998) by the Transcontinental Saxophone Quartet at Lawrence University Conservatory in Appleton, Wisconsin. The work is modelled on the form of a Baroque cantata.

Recitation Book (2006), for saxophone quartet. Commissioned for the Masato Kumoi Saxophone Quartet in 2006. A five-movement work on the theme of death.

Sonata for Alto Saxophone and Piano (1989). Premiered January 1989 by Susan Jennings (saxophone) and Bruce Patterson (piano) at the yearly United States Navy Band International Saxophone Symposium, held at George Mason University in Fairfax, Virginia. A huge and demanding piece in three movements, with musical roots in Liszt, Gesualdo, and Pettersson.

Little Concerto for Six Players (1990), for flute, oboe, clarinet, bassoon, violin, and piano.

Tears: Montana Music No. 5 (1994), for viola, cello, bassoon, and piano. Dedicated to bassoonist John Steinmetz.

Songs For The Coming Day (2012), for saxophone quartet. Commissioned by the Masato Kumoi Saxophone Quartet and consortium. A nine-movement work of "songs without words."

Sonata for Horn and Piano

Sonata for Bassoon and Piano (2004), a substantial four-movement piece dedicated to bassoonist Per Hannevold.

This is the World (2009), a five-movement piece for two pianos and two percussionists. The work uses the painting Nighthawks by Edward Hopper as inspiration.

Songbook for Marimba and Alto Saxophone. A seven-movement piece based on old hymns and Bach chorales.

Quintet for Winds No. 1 (1984) - first performed by the Aspen Wind Quintet

Quintet for Winds No. 2 (1986) - written for the Manhattan Wind Quintet

Quintet for Winds No. 3 (1999) - commissioned by the Missouri Quintet

Quintet for Winds No. 4 (2008) - commissioned and premiered by the Sarasota Wind Quintet.

== Percussion works ==
Arcadia II: Concerto for Marimba and Percussion Ensemble (1982). Premiered December 1987 by soloist Todd A. Johnson and the Central Michigan University Percussion Ensemble (Robert Hohner, conductor). Unrelated to the Maslanka work Arcadia for cello quartet.

Arcadia: Transcribed for Marimba Quartet by Jeffery A. White.

Crown of Thorns (1991), for keyboard percussion ensemble. Commissioned and premiered (November 1991) by the Percussion Ensemble of the University of Oklahoma at Norman (Richard Gipson, conductor).

Hohner (2001), for large percussion ensemble, is a single-movement, ten-minute work composed as a memorial to conductor and teacher Robert Hohner.

Montana Music: Three Dances for Percussion (1992), for percussion ensemble. Commissioned and then premiered (December 1993) by the Central Michigan University Percussion Ensemble (Robert Hohner, conductor) at the Midwest International Band and Orchestra Clinic in Chicago. The dances are slow, melodic, and nocturnal.

Montana Music: Fantasy on a Chorale Tune (1993), transcribed by Jeffery A. White for vibraphone and marimba duet.

My Lady White (1980), for solo marimba. Commissioned by Harvey Vogel. Premiered May 1980 in Dallas, Texas, by soloist Lauren Vogel. Three movements, each a reflection of a poetic image. The title references a poem of that name by Chaucer.

Time Stream (2002). for steel drum band, is an eight-minute piece based on the Bach chorale Christ lag in Todesbanden.

Variations on "Lost Love" (1997), for solo marimba. Commissioned by the New York State Music Educators Association. Premiered October 1997 by soloist Leigh Howard Stevens at Ithaca College.
