= 2015 Camellia Bowl =

2015 Raycom Media Camellia Bowl
- 2nd Camellia Bowl
Ohio Bobcats	Appalachian State Mountaineers
(8–4)	(10–2)
MAC	Sun Belt
29	31
Head coach: Frank Solich	Head coach: Scott Satterfield
	1	2	3	4	Total
Ohio	0	17	7	5	29
Appalachian State	7	0	0	24	31
- Date: December 19, 2015
- Season: 2015
- Stadium: Cramton Bowl
- Location: Montgomery, Alabama
- MVP: Appalachian State RB Marcus Cox
- Favorite: Appalachian State by 4.5
- National anthem: USAF Technical Sergeant Paige Wroble
- Referee: Todd LaPenta (AAC)
- Halftime show: Appalachian State University Marching Mountaineers and Ohio University Marching 110
- Attendance: 21,395
- Payout: US$$100,000 per team

United States TV coverage
- Network: ESPN
- Announcers: Dave Neal, Anthony Becht, Paul Carcaterra

The 2015 Raycom Media Camellia Bowl was a post-season American college football bowl game between the Ohio Bobcats of the Mid-American Conference (MAC) and the Appalachian State Mountaineers of the Sun Belt Conference. Played on December 19, 2015, at Cramton Bowl in Montgomery, Alabama, it was the second edition of the bowl game and the final matchup of the 2015 NCAA Division I-Football Bowl Subdivision (Division I-FBS) football season for both teams.

The Ohio Bobcats entered the game with an 8–4 record, having finished second in the East Division of the MAC behind the Bowling Green Falcons. The Appalachian State Mountaineers, in their first year of FBS bowl eligibility following a two–year transition from the Division I-Football Championship Subdivision (Division I-FCS), entered with a 10–2 record and had finished second in the Sun Belt, having lost only to the Clemson Tigers and the conference champion Arkansas State Red Wolves. Appalachian State entered the game as 4.5 point favorites and were expected to have an edge due to their strong rushing offense.

The Mountaineers led 7–0 at the end of the first quarter but trailed 17–7 at halftime following three Ohio scores in the last two minutes of the second half. After an Ohio touchdown in the third quarter extended the lead to 24–7, the Mountaineers rallied to take a 28–24 lead early in the fourth. The Bobcats took a 29–28 lead with 1:31 left in the fourth quarter but the Mountaineers were able to drive down the field and score a game-winning 23-yard field goal as time expired to secure a 31–29 win. Appalachian State running back Marcus Cox, who rushed for 162 yards and a touchdown, was named the game's most valuable player.

== Team selection ==
The Camellia Bowl, created and owned by ESPN, was created in 2014 and designed to match up a team from the Sun Belt Conference with a team from the Mid-American Conference. The game's creation was requested by the two conferences, both lower-tier conferences in the Division I Football Bowl Subdivision (FBS) that desired additional bowl bids. Its payout of $100,000 per team was the smallest of any bowl game for the 2015 season.

Seven teams from the MAC and four from the Sun Belt were bowl-eligible. All 11 were selected for bowls, tying records for both conferences. For the 2015 Camellia Bowl, the Ohio Bobcats were chosen to represent the MAC and the Appalachian State Mountaineers were chosen to represent the Sun Belt. The Mountaineers entered the game as 4.5 point favorites; analysts pointed to their strong ground game as an advantage, although some felt that the Ohio defense could provide a challenge.

=== Ohio Bobcats ===
Although the Ohio Bobcats had finished the 2014 season with a bowl-eligible record of 6–6, they were not selected to play in a bowl game. It marked the end of a five-game bowl appearance streak under head coach Frank Solich. A preseason poll of MAC media members predicted that Ohio would finish tied for second place in the conference's East division while Athlon Sports predicted they would finish in fourth in the East division. The Bobcats finished the regular season with an 8–4 overall record and a 5–3 record in MAC conference games, ranking second in the East division. Although the team lost three consecutive games in November, they closed out the regular season with three consecutive wins. Five Ohio players were named to the MAC's all-conference team.

Ohio's defense ranked 49th in the country. The Bobcats dealt with a series of major injuries throughout the season. Due to injuries, the team was forced to rely on two separate quarterbacks, Derrius Vick and JD Sprague, for much of the season. Ohio entered the Camellia Bowl with a large number of their major contributors on the injury report; most of the team's running backs, their starting tight end, and their starting cornerback all were questionable or out for the game, and although Sprague and Vick were both initially expected to play, Vick was ultimately held out due to injury.

=== Appalachian State Mountaineers ===
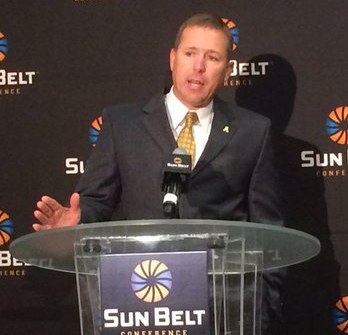
Scott Satterfield, the head coach of the Appalachian State Mountaineers.

The Mountaineers entered the 2015 season in their first year of bowl eligibility following a two-year transition period from the FCS to the FBS; although the team had finished 7–5 in 2014, they were ineligible to compete in a bowl game. The team was coached by Scott Satterfield, in his third year with the Mountaineers; Satterfield had led the Mountaineers through their transition to the FBS. Ahead of the 2015 season, the team was predicted to finish fourth in the conference by Athlon Sports as well as in a poll of all 11 Sun Belt Conference head coaches. The Mountaineers would ultimately finish the regular season with a 10–2 record. Their only losses were against the Clemson Tigers and the Arkansas State Red Wolves and their 7–1 conference record was second only to Arkansas State, who finished a perfect 8–0 in conference play.

The team was led on offense by a formidable running game that ranked sixth in the FBS with an average of 268.8 yards per game. Running back Marcus Cox, a junior, finished the regular season with 11 touchdowns and over 1,200 rushing yards while redshirt freshman Jalin Moore contributed an additional five touchdowns and averaged seven yards a carry. Quarterback Taylor Lamb, a sophomore, had passed for over 2,200 yards, completing 61% of passes and throwing 29 touchdowns and eight interceptions while rushing for 385 yards and four touchdowns. Defensively, the team ranked 12th in the FBS in yards allowed and had the best red zone defense in the FBS. Several Appalachian State players were recognized in the Sun Belt's yearly awards; senior defensive lineman Ronald Blair was named the Sun Belt Defensive Player of the Year and nine players were named to the Sun Belt all-conference team.

== Game summary ==
=== Broadcast and game notes ===
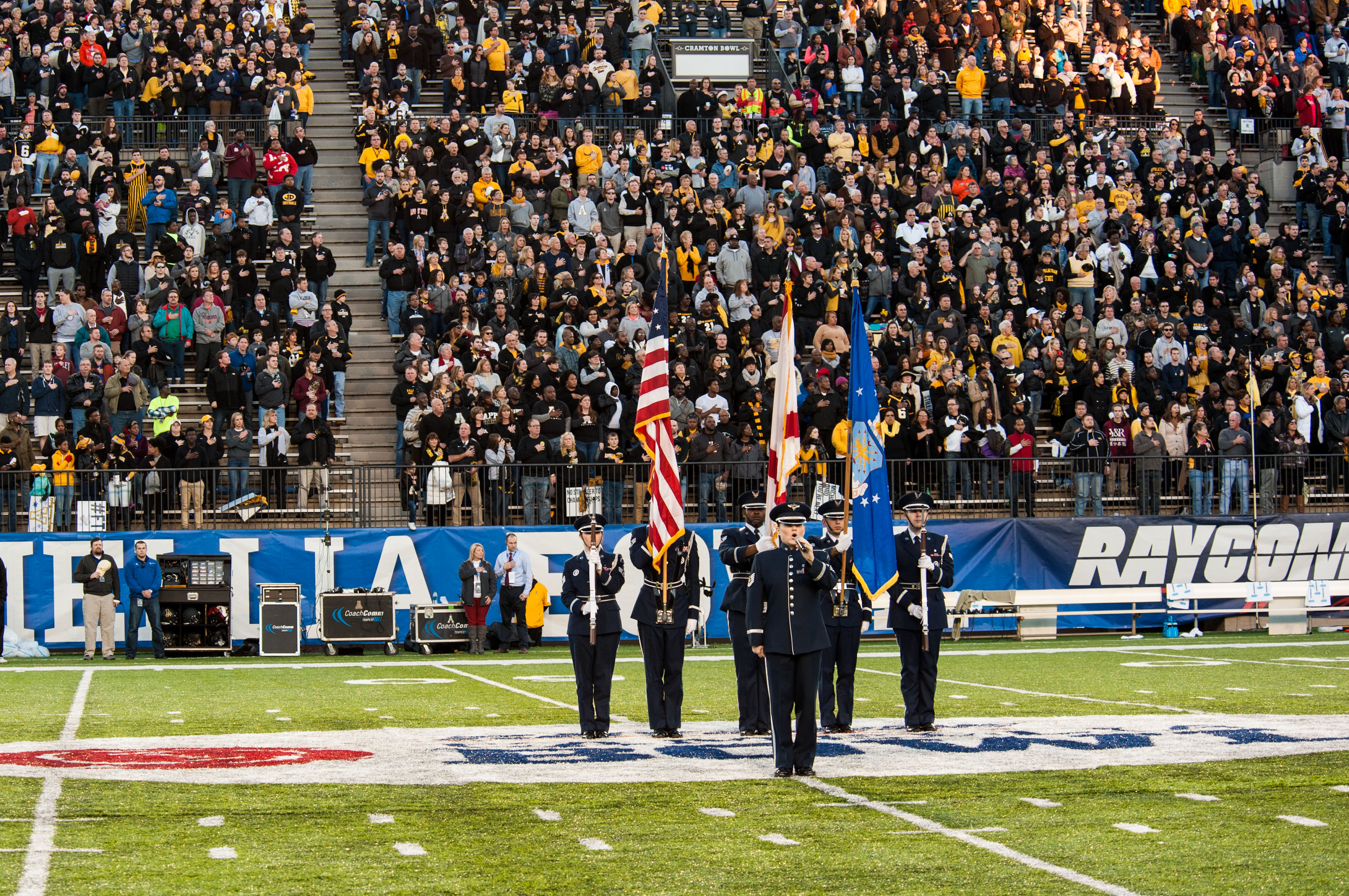
The national anthem was performed by United States Air Force Technical Sergeant Paige Wroble.

The 2015 Camellia Bowl was broadcast on television on ESPN and on radio at ESPN Radio. Dave Neal, Anthony Becht, and Paul Carcaterra served as the announcers for the television broadcast. The weather during the game was sunny, with temperatures of 52 °F (11 °C) and wind heading northwest at 3 miles per hour (4.8 km/h). The referee, the head of the officiating team, was Todd LaPenta.

The national anthem was performed by United States Air Force Technical Sergeant Paige Wroble, while the halftime show was performed by the Appalachian State University Marching Mountaineers and Ohio University Marching 110. Overall attendance was recorded at 21,395, an increase of over 1,000 people from the inaugural game. The game kicked off at 4:40 p.m. central time and ended at 8:19, having lasted a total of three hours and 39 minutes.

=== First quarter ===
Appalachian State won the pregame coin toss and opted to defer to the second half; Ohio chose to receive the ball and returned the kickoff to their 29-yard line. Ohio was held to a three and out and punted the ball to Appalachian State, who fair caught the ball at their 35-yard line. Appalachian State began a 10-play, 43-yard drive and reached as far as Ohio's 15-yard line. However, they were forced back to the Ohio 22-yard line, where kicker Zac Matics missed a 39-yard field goal attempt. On the ensuing drive, Ohio was again held to a three and out and was forced to punt. Although Appalachian State fair caught the punt at their 35-yard line, an unnecessary roughness penalty on Ohio moved the ball to the 49-yard line. The Mountaineers proceeded to score in a four play drive that culminated in a 21-yard touchdown run by quarterback Taylor Lamb; the extra point attempt by Matics put the Mountaineers up 7–0.

Ohio returned the ensuing kickoff to their 26-yard line, but two 15-yard penalties on the Mountaineers moved the ball to the Appalachian State 44-yard line. Despite the favorable field position, Ohio was again held to a three and out and punted the ball, which landed in the end zone for a touchback. On the first play of the drive, running back Jalin Moore ran the ball 55 yards to the Ohio 25-yard line, but the Mountaineers were stopped from advancing the ball further by Ohio and Matics subsequently missed a 42-yard field goal attempt. Ohio was held to another three and out on their next drive and punted the ball to Appalachian State, who fair caught the ball at the 32 yard line. On the subsequent drive, the Mountaineers were apparently held to a three and out, but a pass interference penalty on Ohio gave the Mountaineers a new set a downs. A Jalin Moore run for a loss of four yards closed out the first quarter with the Mountaineers up 7–0.

=== Second quarter ===
On second down, Lamb completed a 12-yard pass to Simms McElfresh, but a Jalin Moore run on third and two failed to gain any yards. Bentley Critcher punted the ball to Ohio returner Papi White, who fair caught it at the Ohio 19-yard line. On the subsequent drive, Ohio recorded their first first down of the game on a 12-yard pass by JD Sprague to Papi White and gained a second on an 11-yard pass to Daz'mond Patterson. However, Ohio's offense stalled and the Bobcats were forced to punt to the Mountaineers, who fair caught the ball at their 17-yard line.

On the ensuing drive, Appalachian State converted a 3rd and 2 with a seven-yard completion to Barrett Burns and followed it up with a 25-yard run from Marcus Cox. At the Ohio 43-yard line, the Mountaineers advanced to a 3rd and 2 but were forced into a 4th and 5 after Cox lost five yards on a run. The Mountaineers went for it on fourth down but were stopped by Ohio after only a two-yard gain. On the following drive, Ohio was immediately forced into a 1st and 20 following a holding penalty, but were able to convert a 3rd and 16 on an 18-yard run by Sprague, and then converted another first down on a 10-yard run by Papi White. The Bobcats were able to advance to the Appalachian State 18-yard line but were held, and kicker Josiah Yazdani converted a 36-yard field goal to cut the Appalachian State lead to 7–3 with 1:31 left in the quarter.

On the first play of the Mountaineers' ensuing drive, Lamb threw an interception to Quenting Polling, who returned it for a touchdown, making the score 10–7 following Yazdani's extra point. Appalachian State received the ball on the kickoff but fumbled the ball after five plays, giving Ohio the ball at the Appalachian State 23-yard line. A. J. Ouellette ran for a seven-yard touchdown on Ohio's second play, and Yazdani's extra point made the score 17–7 with 0:20 left in the quarter; following the kickoff, the Mountaineers ran the ball once for no yards, taking the game to half.

=== Third quarter ===
Appalachian State received the kickoff to start the second half but were held to a three and out on their opening drive, leading to a punt that was fair caught at the Ohio 34-yard line. The Bobcats gained a first down following a three-yard run by Ouellette and a seven-yard pass from Sprague to Brendan Cope, but were held on the next set of downs and punted the ball to Appalachian State, who fair caught the ball at their 16-yard line. The Mountaineers were again held to a three and out and punted the ball to Ohio, who fair caught it at the 50-yard line.

Although a 39-yard pass from Sprague to Cope brought the ball to the Mountaineer 11-yard line, Appalachian State defensive lineman Ronald Blair forced and recovered a fumble, returning it to the Appalachian State 33-yard line. The Mountaineers were able to advance the ball nine yards before Ohio linebacker Jovon Johnson forced an Ike Lewis fumble and returned it for a touchdown. Ohio took a 24–7 lead with 8:06 left in the quarter following the Yazdani extra point. The teams traded punts on their next two drives, with Appalachian State taking control of the ball at their own three yard line with 2:50 left in the quarter. The Mountaineers ran eight plays to close out the quarter, advancing the ball to the Ohio 26-yard line as the quarter ended.

=== Fourth quarter ===
Appalachian State ran three more plays culminating in a 17-yard touchdown pass from Lamb to Burns, and the extra point from Matics made the score 24–14. The following Ohio drive ended with an interception after only two plays, followed immediately by a 26-yard touchdown run by Cox to cut the Bobcats lead to three. Ohio threw another interception on their next drive, giving Appalachian State possession of the ball at the Ohio 47-yard line. A 36-yard run by Cox was followed up three plays later with an eight-yard touchdown pass from Lamb to Burns, and the Matics extra point gave the Mountaineers a 28–24 lead. Following the kickoff, Ohio started their drive at their own 24-yard line. Although the Bobcats were able to advance 42 yards in 11 plays, they were forced into a 4th and 9 from the Appalachian State 34-yard line. Ohio opted to punt, and the Mitch Bonnstetter punt was downed at the Appalachian State three-yard line. Cox attempted to run on first down but was tackled by Jovon Johnson in the end zone for a safety, cutting the Mountaineer lead to 28–26 with 6:06 left in the quarter.

Ohio returned the safety kickoff to their over 45-yard line. Although the Bobcats were forced into a 4th and 1 on their opening set of downs, they were able to convert on a 33-yard completion from backup quarterback Greg Windham to Kawmae Sawyer; Windham had entered the game in relief of Sprague, who was injured earlier in the quarter. Three runs from Ouellette gave the Bobcats a 4th and 1 from the four-yard line; Ohio opted to kick, and Yazdani's 21-yard field goal attempt was good, giving the Bobcats a 29–28 lead with 1:47 left in the quarter. Appalachian State began the final drive of the game at their 21-yard line, gaining a first down a 14-yard completion from Lamb to McElfresh and then another on a 32-yard run by Lamb that advanced the ball to Ohio's 27-yard line. A 15-yard run by Moore moved the ball to the Ohio 11-yard line, and the Mountaineers were able to advance the ball to Ohio's 6-yard line with 0:02 left. A 23-yard game-winning field goal attempt by Matics was good, giving the Mountaineers a 31–29 win.

=== Scoring summary ===
Scoring summary

Quarter	Time	Drive			Team	Scoring information	Score	
Quarter	Time	Plays	Yards	TOP	Team	Scoring information	Ohio	Appalachian State
1	7:17	4	51	1:31	Appalachian State	Taylor Lamb 21-yard touchdown run, Zach Matics kick good	0	7
2	1:31	11	45	5:56	Ohio	36-yard field goal by Josiah Yazdani	3	7
2	1:22	—	—	—	Ohio	Interception returned 20 yards for touchdown by Quentin Poling, Josiah Yazdani kick good	10	7
2	0:20	2	23	0:19	Ohio	A. J. Ouellette 7-yard touchdown run, Josiah Yazdani kick good	17	7
3	8:06	—	—	—	Ohio	Fumble recovery returned 45 yards for touchdown by Jovon Johnson, Josiah Yazdani kick good	24	7
4	13:52	11	97	4:46	Appalachian State	Barrett Burns 17-yard touchdown reception from Taylor Lamb, Zach Matics kick good	24	14
4	13:10	1	26	0:07	Appalachian State	Marcus Cox 26-yard touchdown run, Zach Matics kick good	24	21
4	11:56	4	47	1:02	Appalachian State	Barrett Burns 8-yard touchdown reception from Taylor Lamb, Zach Matics kick good	24	28
4	6:06	1	-3	0:04	Ohio	Marcus Cox tackled in end zone for a safety by Jovon Johnson	26	28
4	1:47	8	51	4:19	Ohio	21-yard field goal by Josiah Yazdani	29	28
4	0:00	9	73	1:47	Appalachian State	23-yard field goal by Zach Matics	29	31
"TOP" = time of possession. For other American football terms, see Glossary of American football.							29	31

== Statistical summary ==
Statistical comparison
	Ohio	Appalachian State
1st downs	15	24
Total yards	272	427
Passing yards	165	124
Rushing yards	107	303
Penalties	7–85	9–80
3rd down conversions	3–14	5–13
Turnovers	3	3
Time of Possession	30:06	29:54

Appalachian State running back Marcus Cox was awarded the game's Bart Starr Most Valuable Player Award, named for Bart Starr, a native of Montgomery and a former Alabama Crimson Tide and Green Bay Packers quarterback. Cox recorded 162 yards rushing and one touchdown on 24 carries, averaging 6.8 yards per carry. Jalin Moore recorded an additional 96 yards on 13 carries for the Mountaineers, while quarterback Taylor Lamb rushed for 51 yards and a touchdown. The Mountaineers outrushed Ohio 303–107 in total; A.J. Ouellette was the leading rushing for Ohio, rushing for 45 yards and one touchdown on 14 attempts, while quarterback JD Sprague added an additional 35 yards on 10 carries.

Lamb completed 13 of 26 passing attempts for 124 yards, throwing for two touchdowns and one interception. Sprague completed 14 of 28 attempts for 132 yards with no touchdowns and two interceptions; Ohio's backup quarterback, Greg Windham, attempted and completed one pass for 33 yards. Wide receiver Simms McElfresh was the leading receiver for the Mountaineers with five receptions for 42 yards, while tight end Barrett Burns caught three passes for 32 yards and two touchdowns. The leading receiver for the Bobcats was wide receiver Brendan Cope, who caught two passes for 46 yards, while wide receiver Papi White had the most receptions, catching four passes for 32 yards.

Ohio linebacker Jovon Johnson recorded two scoring plays in the game, a 45-yard fumble return in the third quarter and a safety in the fourth. Toran Davis, a safety, led the Bobcats with 14 tackles while linebacker Quentin Polling recorded 11 tackles as well as an interception return for a touchdown. Linebacker Devan Stringer was the leading tackler for the Mountaineers, recording 10 tackles, while linebacker Eric Boggs added an additional 9 tackles as well as a sack.

== Aftermath ==
According to Sports Media Watch, the 2015 Camellia Bowl had a television audience of 1.9 million viewers, an increase of 73% from the inaugural game the year before. Of the six bowl games played on the day, the Camellia Bowl ranked second behind only the 2015 Boca Raton Bowl, which drew a television audience of 2 million. Tom Fornelli of CBS Sports ranked it as the 11th-best bowl of the 2015 season and remarked that "I'm guessing a lot of people skipped past this one, and that's too bad for them", while Kevin Trahan of SB Nation called the game "awesome" and felt it was proof that there aren't too many bowl games.

As a result of the game, Appalachian State improved to 11–2 and Ohio dropped to 8–5. Ohio's all-time bowl record dropped from 2–6 to 2–7 following the loss. The Mountaineers became the first team to win a bowl game in their first year of bowl eligibility and their 11 wins marked the most of any team in Sun Belt history as well as the most wins by a team in their first year of bowl eligibility. Following the game, the Mountaineers received seven votes in the final AP Poll and nine votes in the final Coaches Poll, ranking 33rd and 34th in overall voting, respectively.
