= Laura Harris Hales =

American writer, historian, and podcaster (1967–2022)

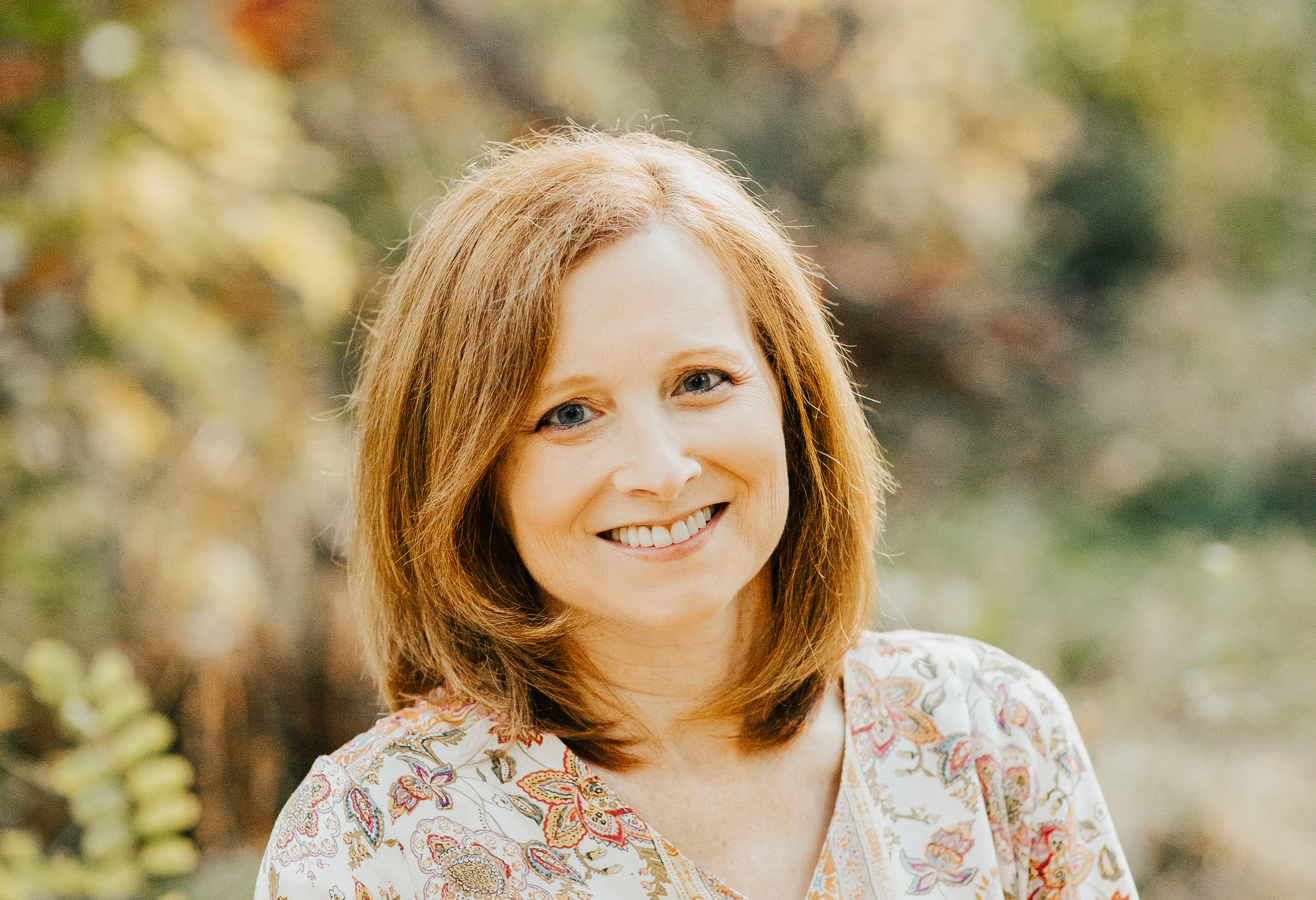
- Born: Laura Elizabeth Harris; August 12, 1967; Madison, Wisconsin, U.S.
- Died: April 13, 2022 (aged 54); Kaysville, Utah, U.S.
- Education: Brigham Young University; New England College; Arizona State University
- Occupations: Writer; historian; podcaster
- Spouses: Brian Dursteler (m. 1988; div. 2005) Brian C. Hales (m. 2013)
- Children: 5
- Website: JosephSmithsPolygamy.org

Laura Elizabeth Harris Hales (August 12, 1967 – April 13, 2022) was an American writer, historian, and podcaster who focused on matters of history, theology, and culture of the Church of Jesus Christ of Latter-day Saints (LDS Church) of which she was a life-long member.

== Early life ==
Hales was born in Madison, Wisconsin, and grew up in Michigan and Minnesota. Alfred, her father, was an agricultural engineer and her mother Margaret Harris (née Lewis) worked as a teacher. She obtained a bachelor's degree in international relations from Brigham Young University in 1988 and a master's degree in professional writing from New England College in 2013. In 2020, she obtained a master's degree in history with a focus on North American history from the School of Historical, Philosophical and Religious Studies at Arizona State University.

== Writings and podcasts ==
Hales and her second husband, Brian C. Hales, published extensively on Joseph Smith and his polygamy and maintain the website JosephSmithsPolygamy.org. Hales edited a series of essays, A Reason for Faith: Navigating LDS Doctrine and Church History, that provide complex context and answers for troubling aspects of the LDS Church's past. “There is a need for a broader discussion of 19th-century Latter-day Saint women who cry out for identities beyond a wife number or an age,” she said in an interview with the church's website From the Desk discussing the era of polygamy in the Latter-Day Saints. “Filtering their lives only through their relationships to their husbands does little to resolve the silences of women’s history.”

In 2016, Hales created the Latter-day Saint Perspectives podcast that explores 'Latter-day Saint history, doctrine, and culture' through interviews with authors, scholars, and historians. Episodes include interviews with Fiona Givens, Kate Holbrook, Melissa Wei-Tsing Inouye, and Patrick Q. Mason. As of 2021 she served as the executive director and frequent host of the podcast. In May 2021, Hales announced that the podcast would not be adding any new shows and Hales would be pursuing other projects.

== Personal life ==
Hales was a member of the LDS Church. She was married to Brian Dursteler from 1988 until their divorce in 2005; the couple had five children. She married Brian C. Hales in 2013; combined from their respective families, they had nine children.

Hales died from pancreatic cancer at her home in Kaysville, Utah, on April 13, 2022, aged 54.

== Bibliography ==
- A Reason for Faith: Navigating LDS Doctrine and Church History (Editor) Deseret Book Company, 2016. ISBN 978-1944394011
- Joseph Smith's Polygamy: Toward a Better Understanding (with Brian C. Hales) Greg Kofford Books, Incorporated, 2015. ISBN 978-1589587236
- Viewing the Temple Through Wilford Woodruff’s Eyes (Interpreter: A Journal of Mormon Scripture Book 18) The Interpreter Foundation, 2015.
