= Melissa Inouye =

American academic

Melissa Wei-Tsing Inouye
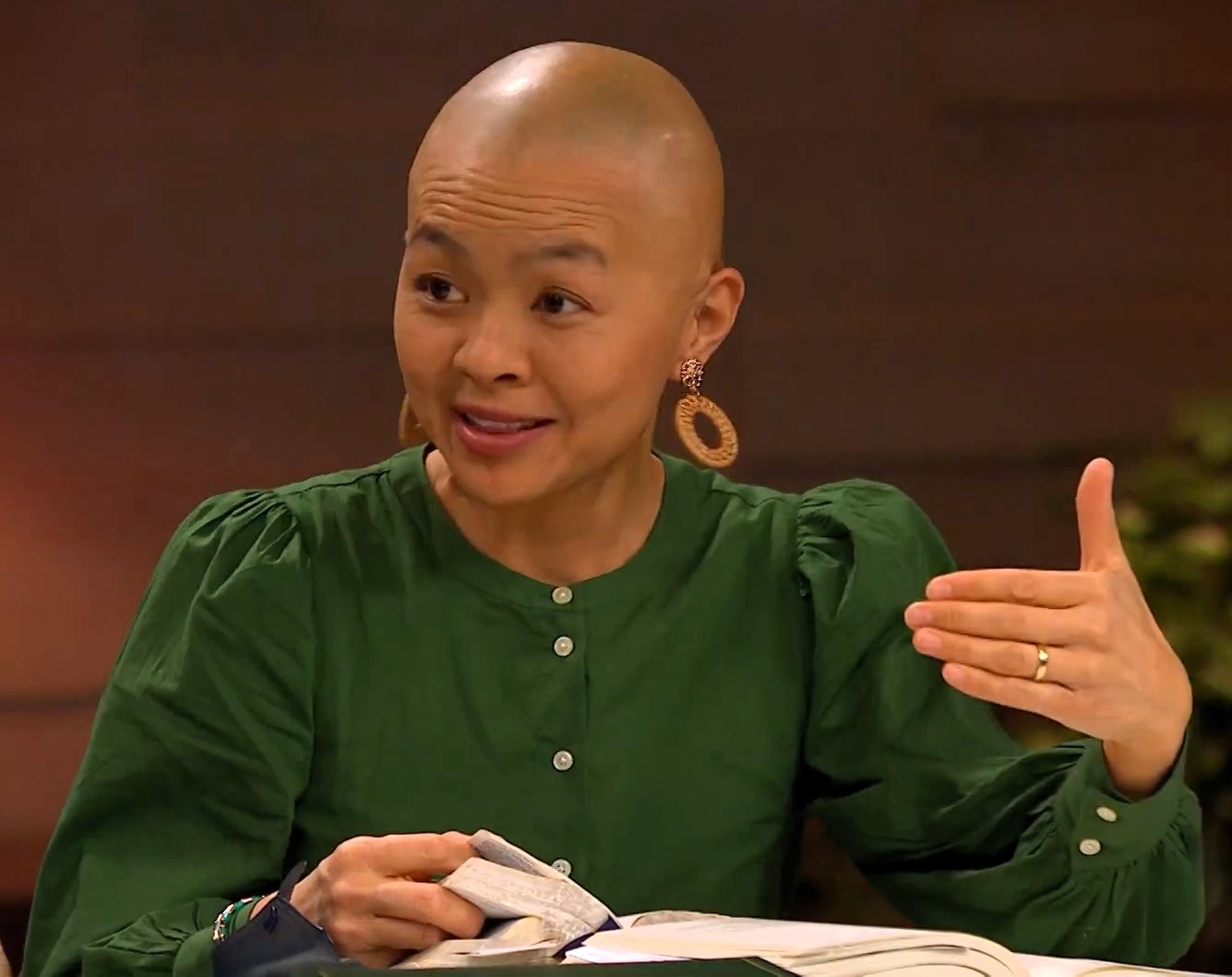
- Inouye in 2022
- Born: 13 August 1979; Newport Beach, California, U.S.
- Died: 23 April 2024 (aged 44); Utah, U.S.
- Education: Harvard University
- Occupations: senior lecturer, historian
- Employer: University of Auckland
- Known for: China and the True Jesus: Charisma and Organization in a Chinese Christian Church
- Spouse: Joseph McMullin (m. 2003)
- Children: 4

Melissa Wei-Tsing Inouye (13 April 1979 – 23 April 2024) was an American historian. She was a senior lecturer in Chinese studies at the University of Auckland and a historian for the Church of Jesus Christ of Latter-day Saints (LDS Church). She was an expert in the social and cultural history of modern China, charismatic global Christianity, and women and religion.

== Early life ==
Inouye grew up in Costa Mesa, California. She was a fourth-generation Chinese-Japanese American. Her Chinese great-grandfather, Gin Gor Ju, came to the United States from Guangdong province and settled in Utah. Her father's family was originally from Japan. Her father's parents, Bessie Shizuko Murakami Inouye and Charles Ichiro Inouye, met and married in a World War II-era Japanese American internment camp in Heart Mountain, Wyoming.

== Education ==
In 2003, she graduated magna cum laude in East Asian studies from Harvard College, delivering the Harvard Oration at the class day graduation exercises. She received a PhD in East Asian languages and civilizations from Harvard University in 2011. While researching and writing her dissertation, Miraculous Mundane: The True Jesus Church and Chinese Christianity in the Twentieth Century, she lived in Xiamen, China, and was an affiliate of the Shanghai Academy of Social Sciences from 2009 to 2010. She served as an associate editor of the Mormon Studies Review and as a frequent contributor on topics of religion. In 2019, she had her book China and the True Jesus: Charisma and Organization in a Chinese Christian Church published by Oxford University Press.

== Personal life ==
Inouye was married and had four children. She lived in California, Taiwan, China, Japan, Hong Kong, Massachusetts, Utah, and New Zealand. She was a member of the LDS Church and served as a missionary for the church in Taiwan. She was diagnosed with colon cancer in 2017 and died on April 23, 2024.

== Publications ==
- Inouye, M. (2018). "Speaking in the Devil’s Tongue? The True Jesus Church’s Uneasy Rhetorical Accommodation to Maoism, 1948–1958." Modern China, 44(6), 1–31. 10.1177/0097700418763557
- Inouye, M. (2018). "Tale of Three Primaries: Critical Mass in Mormonism’s Informal Institutions." In G. Colvin, J. Brooks (eds.) Decolonizing Mormonism: Approaching a Postcolonial Zion (pp. 229–262). Salt Lake City: University of Utah Press.
- Inouye, M. (2017). "Charismatic Crossings: The Transnational, Transdenominational Friendship of Bernt Berntsen and Wei Enbo." In F. Yang, J. Tong, A. Anderson (eds.) Global Chinese Pentecostal and Charismatic Christianity (pp. 91–117). Leiden: Brill.
- Inouye, M. (2017). "Charismatic Moderns: Pluralistic Discourse within Chinese Protestant Communities, 1905–1926." Twentieth-Century China, 42(1), 26–51. 10.1353/tcc.2017.0006
- Inouye, M. (2016). "A Religious Rhetoric of Competing Modernities: Christian Print Culture in Late Qing China." In G. Song (ed.) Reshaping the Boundaries: The Christian Intersection of China and the West in the Modern Era (pp. 106–122). Hong Kong: University of Hong Kong Press.
- Inouye, M. (2016). Culture and Agency in Mormon Women’s Lives. In Kate Holbrook, M. Bowman (eds.) Women and Mormonism: Historical and Contemporary Perspectives (pp. 230–246). Salt Lake City, Utah: University of Utah Press.
- Inouye, M. (2015). "Miraculous Modernity: Charismatic Traditions and Trajectories within Chinese Protestant Christianity." In V. Goossaert, J. Kiely, J. Lagerwey (eds.) Modern Chinese Religion II: 1850–2015 (pp. 884–919). Boston and Leiden: Brill Academic Publishers. 10.1163/9789004304642_023
- Inouye, M. (2014). "The Oak and the Banyan: The ‘Glocalization’ of Mormon Studies." Mormon Studies Review, 1, 70–79.

== Bibliography ==
- Sacred Struggle: Seeking Christ on the Path of Most Resistance (Deseret Book, 2023) ISBN 1639931872
- China and the True Jesus: Charisma and Organization in a Chinese Christian Church (Oxford University Press, 2019) ISBN 978-0190923464
- Crossings: A Bald Asian American Latter-day Saint Woman Scholar’s Ventures through Life, Death, Cancer, and Motherhood (Not Necessarily in That Order) (Maxwell Institute, 2019) ISBN 9781944394806

== Awards ==
- 2019 AML Award for creative nonfiction, Crossings: A Bald Asian American Latter-day Saint Woman Scholar’s Ventures through Life, Death, Cancer, and Motherhood (Not Necessarily in That Order)
