= Justin Vélez-Hagan =

Policy analyst and author

Justin Vélez-Hagan is a policy analyst, investor, entrepreneur, and author of the books, The Paradox of Fiscal Austerity and The Common Sense behind Basic Economics. He is a frequent news and opinion contributor, having contributed articles to Fox News, Forbes, and The Hill newspaper in Washington, D.C., among others. He also founded and served as the national executive director of the National Puerto Rican Chamber of Commerce, based in Washington, D.C., as well as the Macro Policy Institute and Solid G Holdings, with investments primarily in the healthcare industry. In 2022, he was appointed by the Governor of Virginia to serve on the state's Joint Advisory Board of Economists. Vélez-Hagan received a BS in Finance from the University of Louisville College of Business, an MBA from Arizona State University, and a Ph.D. in Economic Policy from the University of Maryland, Baltimore County. As a former member of the United States Air Force Reserve with the 459th Air Refueling Wing at Joint Base Andrews in Maryland, Vélez-Hagan was called to active duty and deployed to Kandahar, Afghanistan in 2012 during Operation Enduring Freedom.
