= Jennifer Reeder (historian) =

American historian

Jennifer Reeder is an American historian and writer and is currently the nineteenth-century women’s history specialist at the Church History Department (CHD) of the Church of Jesus Christ of Latter-day Saints (LDS Church).

Reeder obtained degrees from Brigham Young University, Arizona State University, and New York University. She has worked at the New York Historical Society, the Brooklyn Museum Libraries and Archives, the American Jewish Historical Society, the Fourth Universalist Society in the City of New York Archive, and the Joseph Fielding Smith Institute for Church History. She has a PhD in American history from George Mason University, specializing in women’s history.

== Church History Department ==
When Reeder began her employment in the CHD in 2013, she became one of the first historians hired to specialize on women’s history. During her time at the CHD, the LDS Church has seen the role of women expand and evolve. These include prayers being given by women in the church's general conference, leadership positions in executive councils, and writings about Heavenly Mother. Reeder was a collaborator on The First Fifty Years of Relief Society, a collection of original documents that explores nineteenth-century history of the Relief Society—the LDS Church's women's organization.

Reeder published The Witness of Women: Firsthand Experiences and Testimonies from the Restoration with Janiece Johnson in 2016. In 2017, Reeder collaborated with Kate Holbrook as editors on At the Pulpit: 185 Years of Discourses by Latter-day Saint Women to document public prayers and preachings of 54 LDS Church women--including biographical information and the context of the material.

== Personal life ==
Reeder served as an LDS Church missionary in Italy. She was diagnosed with leukemia in 2010.

== Publications ==
- The Witness of Women: Firsthand Experiences and Testimonies from the Restoration by Janiece Johnson and Jenny Reeder (Deseret Book Company, December 30, 2016, ISBN 978-1629722474)
- At the Pulpit: 185 Years of Discourses by Latter-Day Saint Women edited by Kate Holbrook and Jenny Reeder (Church Historian's Press, March 1, 2017, ISBN 978-1629722825)
- First: The Life and Faith of Emma Smith by Jenny Reeder (Deseret Book Co, March 29, 2021, ISBN 978-1629728780)
