= Jeong-Hee Kim =

South Korean educational scholar

Jeong-Hee Kim is an educational scholar who serves as professor and department chair of Curriculum & Instruction at Texas Tech University. She is known for her work regarding narrative inquiry, phenomenology, and curriculum theory.

== Education ==
Kim was born and raised in South Korea, and earned a Bachelor of Arts in English Education from Chonnam National University in 1988. She later attended Arizona State University, from which she received a Master of Arts in Teaching English to Speakers of Other Languages (TESOL) in 2000 and a Doctor of Philosophy in Curriculum Studies in 2005. She also received a TESOL certificate from the University of Queensland.

== Career ==
Kim began her academic career teaching English in South Korea in the late 1980s and throughout the 1990s.

From 2005 to 2015, Kim taught at Kansas State University (KSU), though she spent a semester as a visiting professor at Seoul National University in early 2013. While at KSU, Kim earned multiple awards, including the Outstanding Narrative Research Article Award from the American Educational Research Association (AERA) in 2007, AERA's Outstanding Narrative Theory Article Award in 2009, and KSU's Faculty Excellence in Research/Creative Activities Award in 2011. In 2015, Kim joined the faculty at Texas Tech University, becoming the department chair in 2019.

In 2015, Kim published Understanding Narrative Inquiry, which won the 2017 AERA Outstanding Publication and was published in Chinese in 2018.

In 2018, Kim received Texas Tech University's Barnie E. Rushing Jr. Outstanding Faculty Researcher award.

Kim also serves on the Editorial Review Board for The Journal of Educational Research.

== Books ==
- Kim, Jeong-Hee; Morales, Amanda R.; Earl, Rusty; Avalos, Sandra (2016). Being the "First": A Narrative Inquiry into the Funds of Knowledge of First Generation College Students in Teacher Education. New Prairie Press. ISBN 978-1-944548-01-8.
- Kim, Jeong-Hee (2015). Understanding Narrative Inquiry: The Crafting and Analysis of Stories as Research. Sage Publications.
