= Montgomery Van Wart =

American scholar of public administration

- Occupations: Academic, author and researcher
- Awards: Outstanding Professor CSUSB, Paul Van Riper Award for Excellence and Service, American Society for Public Administration; Outstanding Originator in Distance Learning, California State University, San Bernardino; Chester A. Newland Presidential Citation of Merit Award, American Society for Public Administration

Academic background
- Education: B.A. M.A., Teaching; Ph.D., Public Administration
- Alma mater: Franklin and Marshall College; Lewis and Clark College; Arizona State University

Academic work
- Institutions: California State University, San Bernardino

Montgomery Van Wart is an American academic, author and researcher. He is a professor of public administration at California State University, San Bernardino.

Van Wart has authored over 150 publications, has been cited over 10,000 times (see https://scholar.google.com/citations?user=6bSiMpwAAAAJ&hl=en for an up-to-date listing) and has a Google Scholar H-index of 36. He has worked on areas encompassing administrative and business leadership, e-leadership, training and development, human resource management, administrative values and ethics, organization behavior, and general management. He has also written eleven books including: Dynamics of Leadership, Leadership in Public Organizations, Human Resource Management in Public Service, Leadership and Culture, Building Business-Government Relations, Leadership Across the Globe, and Changing Public Sector Values.

Throughout his career, Van Wart has been associated with the American Society for Public Administration (ASPA), and was instrumental in redesigning its Code of Ethics.

== Education ==
After receiving his Bachelor of Arts degree from Franklin and Marshall College, Van Wart went to Lewis and Clark College and obtained his Master of Arts in Teaching. He then enrolled at Arizona State University and earned his Doctoral degree in Public Administration in 1990. Van Wart completed the Senior Executives in State and Local Government Program at Harvard University in 1995. He also took graduate business administration course work at Fairleigh Dickinson University.

== Career ==
Van Wart started his academic career as an Affiliated Professor of Public Affairs at Arizona State University and as associate professor of Political Science at Iowa State University in 1996. He was also a Senior Research Fellow at KU Leuven (formerly Catholic University) in Belgium from 2012 till 2013, a visiting professor at Rutgers (2013), and a distinguished visiting professor at the University of Hong Kong, a distinguished visiting professor at the National University of Ireland (Galway), among other visiting international positions. Currently, he is a professor of public administration at California State University, San Bernardino.

Van Wart was the Director of Center for Public Service at Texas Tech University from 2000 till 2003. Later he served as the Chair of Department of Public Administration at University of Central Florida from 2003 to 2005. In 2018, he was appointed as the Director of Faculty Development at JHB College of Business and Public Administration and the CSUSB Faculty Research Fellow in 2020–23.

== Research ==
Van Wart's research is focused in the areas of administrative leadership, applied ethics and values, distance education, comparative public administration, government operations policy, human resource management, learning theory, management theory, online teaching theory, organizational behavior, public policy, state and local government policy.

=== Leadership ===
Van Wart has extensively investigated mainstream leadership and drawn comparisons with public-sector (administrative) leadership. He also tested the utility of the full range leadership theory of Bernard Bass by analyzing a very large government data set. Results of his study indicated the significance of transactional and transformational leadership in the federal government, and found transformational leadership to be slightly more important even after shifting one important factor, individualized consideration, back to the transactional model. He published a paper in 2013 focused on the overarching insights, particularly those of particular importance to leaders in administrative positions in the public sector, and provided a review based on the major findings of the organizational leadership literature.

Van Wart published a book in 2005 entitled, Dynamics of Leadership in Public Service: Theory and Practice, and discussed the competencies needed by organizational leaders at all levels. Furthermore, the book provides a comparative review regarding the theoretical literature on leadership from a public sector perspective. In his book entitled Leadership in Public Organizations: An Introduction, he explored major theories and approaches of leadership, and also investigated the applied leadership competencies. Working with a team of others, he has published a series of articles on e-leadership.

One of his more recent research areas is virtual leadership. Virtual leadership examines the skills necessary for successful management in the virtual age in which he argues it is far more complex and challenging than commonly thought. A second more recent area is examining the various styles of political leadership.

=== Human resource management ===
With colleagues, Van Wart authored Human Resource Management in Public Service, and highlighted the issues in context of management in the public sector along with an emphasis on hands-on skill building and problem solving. He further explored the stages of the employment process, including recruitment, selection, training, legal rights and responsibilities, compensation, and appraisal.

=== Public sector ethics ===
Van Wart focused on fundamental values in revising ASPA's Code of Ethics, and demonstrated five principles or decision-making sources upon which public administrators should draw, and how these are discussed in the literature. He also focused his study on the major contemporary varieties of ethical leadership in organizations, and provided a critique regarding these varieties. In a paper published in 2003, he contrasted the classical notions to the modern day context and usage in current codes of ethics, conduct, and regulations.

=== Online learning ===
In 2020, Van Wart published an article with colleagues based on a large-scale dataset, using exploratory factor analysis to study critical success factors for online learning from the students’ perspective, and determined their hierarchical significance. In this study, it was found there are seven critical aspects of online learning for students: the basic online modality, teaching presence, cognitive presence, online social comfort, instructional support, online interactive modality, and social presence. In a paper published in 2019, he was part of a team who reviewed the online teaching effectiveness literature, and provided a synthesis regarding the state-of-the-field in the higher education context. He conducted a U.S. National Science Foundation grant investigating the best practices for various online modalities in STEM education in 2022-24.

== Awards and honors ==
- 1993 - Governor's Award for Excellence: Individual Award, Arizona
- 2003 - Editor's Choice Award, Public Administration Review
- 2004 - Award for Outstanding Service to the Public Sector Human Resources Profession, Section on Personnel Administration and Labor Relations, American Society for Public Administration
- 2005 - Outstanding Academic Titles award for Dynamics of Leadership in Public Service
- 2009 - Outstanding Educator, Inland Empire ASPA Chapter annual awards
- 2011,2013, 2014 - Chester A. Newland Presidential Citation of Merit Award, The American Society for Public Administration
- 2012, 2014 - Outstanding Researcher, College of Business and Public Administration
- 2014 - CSUSB Outstanding Researcher Award, Cal State San Bernardino (university level)
- 2015 - Paul Van Riper Award for Excellence and Service, American Society for Public Administration
- 2015 - Sage Cornerstone Author Award, for a bestselling textbook, Human Resource Management in Public Service: Paradoxes, Processes, and Problems
- 2017 - Outstanding Teacher Award, CSU JHB College of Business and Public Administration
- 2019 - Chancellor's award for teaching: Faculty Innovation and Leadership Innovation Award (CSU system level), California State University, Long Beach
- 2023 - Outstanding Professor, CSUSB (university level).

== Bibliography ==
=== Books ===
- Handbook of Training and Development for the Public Sector: A Comprehensive Resource (with colleagues, 1993) ISBN 9781555425302
- Changing Public Sector Values (1998) ISBN 9780815320722
- Dynamics of Leadership in Public Service: Theory and Practice (2011) ISBN 9780765623652
- The Business of Leadership: An Introduction (with Bowerman, 2011) ISBN 9780765628015
- Leadership and Culture: Comparative Models of Top Civil Servant Training (2015) ISBN 9781349497874
- Leadership Across the Globe (with Gupta, 2016) ISBN 9781138886100
- Building Business-Government Relations: A Skills Approach (with Ni, 2016) ISBN 9780765640086; second edition called Business, Society and Global Governance, 2023.
- Leadership in Public Organizations: An Introduction (3rd Edition) (2017) ISBN 9780765647023
- Human Resource Management in Public Service: Paradoxes, Processes, and Problems (7th Edition) (with colleagues, 2022) ISBN 9781506382333

=== Selected articles ===
- Van Wart, M. (2003). Public-sector leadership theory: An assessment. Public Administration Review, 214–228.
- Wang, X., & Van Wart, M. (2007). When public participation in administration leads to trust: An empirical assessment of managers’ perceptions. Public Administration Review, 67(2), 265–278.
- Trottier, T., Van Wart, M., & Wang, X. (2008). Examining the nature and significance of leadership in government organizations. Public Administration Review, 68(2), 319–333.
- Van Wart, M. (2013). Lessons from leadership theory and the contemporary challenges of leaders. Public Administration Review, 73(4), 553–565.
- Van Wart, Roman, A., Wang, X., and Liu, C. (2019). Operationalizing the Definition of E-leadership: Identifying the Elements of E-leadership. International Review of Administrative Sciences. February, 85(1), 80–97.
- Van Wart, M., Ni, A., Medina, P., Canelon, J., Liu, Y., Kordrostami, M., and Zhang, J. (2020). Integrating students’ perspectives about online learning: A hierarchy of factors. International Journal of Educational Technology in Higher Education. 17(53), 1-22.
