= Robert A. Reiser =

Education professor (born 1947)

Robert Reiser is an American academic and professor of instructional systems at Florida State University.

== Education and academic career ==
Reiser graduated from Queens College, City University of New York, receiving a Bachelor of Economics with minor in secondary education in June 1970. He received a master's degree in school library media in 1974 and a doctorate in educational technology in 1975, both from Arizona State University.

His academic career began as a graduate assistant for the Department of Educational Technology and Library Science for Arizona State University in August 1972 for three years. In January 1976, he moved on to Florida State University, where he became a research associate, Learning Systems Institute and assistant professor, Department of Educational Research.

He functioned as associate professor, Instructional Systems Program, Department of Educational Research for roughly five years. After which, he became department chair for Department of Educational Research from July 1987 - September 1996. Later, He spent approximately four years as the program leader of Instructional Systems Program for the Department of Educational Psychology and Learning Systems.

He later became professor of Instructional Systems Program for the Department of Educational Psychology and Learning Systems at Florida State University. Then, he held the position of Associate Dean for Research, College of Education at Florida State University from June 2010 to December 2021. He is currently Professor Emeritus of the FSU College of Education.

== Publications ==
=== Journal articles ===
In 2009, Reiser and the Instructional Systems program at the Florida State University over the past two decades received high rankings as an organisation and for their publications. Reiser contributed the most publications to Educational Technology Research and Development and held a ranking of third overall and fifth as an author.

Reiser's Research Gate profile lists 35 publications, which have been cited a total of 720 times.

Below is a selected list of Reiser's journal publications related to the field of instructional design and technology.

- Reiser, Robert A.; Butzin, Sarah M. (1998). "Project TEAMS integrating technology into middle school instruction". TechTrends. 43 (2): 39–44. doi:10.1007/BF02818174. S2CID 62644162.
- Reiser, Robert A.; Ely, Donald P. (1997). "The field of educational technology as reflected through its definitions". Educational Technology Research and Development. 45 (3): 63–72. doi:10.1007/BF02299730. S2CID 145635352.
- Reiser, Robert A. (1994). "Clark's invitation to the dance: An instructional Designer's response". Educational Technology Research and Development. 42 (2): 45–48. doi:10.1007/BF02299091. S2CID 143561061.
- Reiser, Robert A. (1988). "Instructional designers in public schools and higher education: Predictions for the year 2001". Journal of Instructional Development. 11 (3): 3–6. doi:10.1007/BF02905791. S2CID 61101251.
- Reiser, Robert A. (2001). "A history of instructional design and technology: Part I: A history of instructional media". Educational Technology Research and Development. 49: 53–64. doi:10.1007/BF02504506. S2CID 189939846.
- Zahner, Jane E.; Reiser, Robert A.; Dick, Walter; Gill, Barbara (1992). "Evaluating instructional software: A simplified model". Educational Technology Research and Development. 40 (3): 55–62. doi:10.1007/BF02296842. S2CID 61010966.
- Reiser, Robert A. (1978). "Promoting adherence to a new paradigm of instructional management". Journal of Instructional Development. 2: 27–28. doi:10.1007/BF02904324. S2CID 57609079.
- Reiser, Robert A. (1986). "Some questions facing academic programs in instructional technology and some means for answering them". Journal of Instructional Development. 8 (3): 20–23. doi:10.1007/BF02906265. S2CID 60878397.
- Gerlach, Vernon & Reiser, Robert & Brecke, Fritz. (1975). Algorithms in Learning, Teaching, and Instructional Design. 71.
- Reiser, Robert A.; Butain, Sarah M. (2000). "Using Tearning, Active Learning, and Technology to Improve Instruction". Middle School Journal. 32 (2): 21–29. doi:10.1080/00940771.2000.11495263. S2CID 218771500.

=== Books ===
Solis notes, Trends and Issues in Instructional Design and Technology 2nd Ed. was written to define instructional design and technology; the theories involved, job seeking competencies, resources and an explanation of the current direction of field. He asserts the presentation of instructional design models and the systems approach is less prescribed or linear in the book.

Harati recommends the book Trends and Issues in Instructional Design and Technology Third Ed. (2011) for individuals interested in the field of education, instructional design and technology. He asserts that ID seek to address the shortcomings of traditional methods through data collection, chunking, scaffolding and authentic experiences during tasks.

- Reiser, R.A., & Dempsey, J.V. (Eds.) (2002).Trends and Issues in Instructional Design and Technology. Upper Saddle River, New Jersey: Merrill/Prentice Hall.
- Reiser, R.A., & Dempsey, J.V. (Eds.) (2007).Trends and Issues in Instructional Design and Technology (2nd ed.). River, NJ: Pearson Education.
- Reiser, R.A., & Dempsey, J.V. (Eds.) (2012).Trends and Issues in Instructional Design and Technology (3rd ed.). Boston, MA: Pearson Education
- Reiser, R.A., & Dempsey, J.V. (Eds.) (2018). Trends and Issues in Instructional Design and Technology (4th ed.). New York, NY: Pearson Education.
- Reiser, R.A., & Dick, W. (1996). Instructional Planning: A Guide for Teachers (2nd ed.). Boston, Massachusetts: Allyn & Bacon.
- Reiser, R.A., & Gagne, R.M. (1983). Selecting Media for Instruction. Englewood Cliffs, New Jersey: Educational Technology
