= Indigenous Albuquerque =

2011 non-fiction book by Myla Vicenti Carpio

- Author: Myla Vicenti Carpio
- Subjects: Sociology, equity, Indigenous history
- Genre: Non-fiction
- Publisher: Texas Tech University Press
- Publication date: 2011
- Publication place: United States
- ISBN: 978-0896726789

Indigenous Albuquerque is a 2011 non-fiction book by Myla Vicenti Carpio.

It explores the relationship between the Indigenous peoples in the Albuquerque, New Mexico focusing on community's lack of access to healthcare and social support.

== Publication ==
Indigenous Albuquerque was written by Myla Vicenti Carpio and published by Texas Tech University Press in 2011. Carpio (born 1965) is of the Jicarilla Apache Nation and has Laguna and Isleta Pueblo heritage. She moved to Albuquerque as an adult and works as a Native American historian at the Arizona State University, Tempe. She is the co-editor of the “Critical Issues in Indigenous Studies” book series alongside Jeffrey Shepherd (UTEP) published by the University of Arizona Press.

Carpio wrote the book to challenge the prevailing academic views on Indigenous peoples in Albuquerque.

== Synopsis ==
The book explores the relationship between the various Indigenous peoples and the City of Albuquerque with a particular focus on the extent to which the needs of Latino and Anglo communities have been prioritised over those of Indigenous people. The book documents the extent to which community access to healthcare and social supports have been inconsistent from federal and local governments.
