= Maysoon al-Nahar =

Jordanian archaeologist

Maysoon Al-Nahar is a Jordanian archaeologist specializing in the Paleolithic, Epipaleolithic, and Neolithic of the Southern Levant. Al-Nahar studied Anthropology and Prehistory at Arizona State University between 1995 and 2000. She is now a full professor in the Department of Archaeology at the University of Jordan. Prof. Al-Nahar is acting now as Editor-in-Chief for the Jordan Journal for History and Archaeology, which is indexed in SCOPUS. Al-Nahar has held the position of the Dean of the School of Archaeology and Tourism at the University of Jordan (2013-2017). Also in previous years, she served as the Assistant Dean for Archaeological and Heritage Museums, the Head of the Department of Archaeology, and the Museum Director at the University of Jordan. She worked on more than 45 excavations. She directed the Tell Abu Suwwan excavation, Jerash, Jordan, and she is a partner on the left bank of the Jordan Valley, researching the first human settlements project and co-directed more many other excavation projects. Al-Nahar has experience in lithic technologies and analysis and paleoenvironmental reconstruction. She has more to 60 publications.

== Selected publications ==
- 2016 "Human hunting and site occupation intensity in the Early Epipaleolithic of the Jordanian western highlands", Natalie D. Munro, Michael Kennerty, Jacqueline S. Meier, Siavash Samei, Maysoon al-Nahar, Deborah I. Olszewski, Quarterly International, 396 (2016) 31-39.
- 2016 "Late Pleistocene eastern Levant: Landscape strategies in open spaces", Deborah I. Olszewski and Maysoon al-Nahar, Quarterly International, 396 (2016) 1-4.
- 2016 "Persistent and ephemeral places in the Early Epipaleolithic in the Wadi al-Hasa region of the western highlands of Jordan", Deborah I. Olszewski and Maysoon al-Nahar, Quarterly International, 396 (2016) 20-30.
- 2016 "Differential bone preservation and human foraging at the Early Epipaleolithic site of Tor at-Tareeq (WHS1065) in the western highlands of Jordan" Siavash Samei a, Natalie D. Munro, Maysoon al-Nahar, Deborah I. Olszewski, Quarterly International, 396 & 52-61.
- 2016 "Early Epipaleolithic lithics, time-averaging, and site interpretations: Wadi al-Hasa region, Western Highlands of Jordan" Maysoon al-Nahar, Deborah I. Olszewski, Quarterly International, 396 (2016) 40-51.
- 2015 "Early Epipaleolithic sites in the Southern and Central Jordan: Site Function Implications", Maysoon Al-Nahar and Deborah Olszewski, Mediterranean Archeology and Archaeometry (MAA), Vol.15, No.2, pp. 215–227.
- 2015 "The Yarmoukian Pottery Assemblage from Tell Abu Suwwan, Jordan", Maysoon Al-Nahar and Zeidan Kafafi, Mediterranean Archeology and Archaeometry (MAA), Vol. 15, No.3.
- 2015 "Experimental Study of Bone Artifact Manufacture from the Neolithic site Tell Abu Suwwan (PPNB-PN), Jordan" Bellal Abu Helaleh, Maysoon Al-Nahar, Ursula, Thun Hohenstein , Gabriele Luigi Francesco Berruti, Emanuele Cancellieri, Adumatu, 32.
