= Arthur Unsworth =

American academic

1st Dean of the Hayes School of Music
- In office 1989–2000
- Succeeded by: William Harbinson

Personal details
- Education: B.A., Music Education; M.A., Music Composition; Ed.D., Music Theory
- Alma mater: The College of New Jersey; Arizona State University

Arthur Unsworth is an American academic and educator who has served as the inaugural Dean of the Hayes School of Music at Appalachian State University in Boone, North Carolina.

== Early life and education ==
Arthur Unsworth was a music educator whose career spanned several decades and institutions. After earning degrees in music education and composition from Trenton State College (now The College of New Jersey) and a doctorate in music theory from Arizona State University. He taught at Delta State University and Brigham Young University, where he led lower-division music theory and created a video series on music instruction. He later served for eleven years as Associate Dean at the Crane School of Music (SUNY Potsdam) before becoming Dean of the Hayes School of Music at Appalachian State University in 1989.

== Appalachian State University career ==
As Dean, Unsworth instituted the annual multi-ensemble Holiday Scholarship Concert in 1993.

After stepping down as Dean, Dr. Unsworth in 2000 returned to teaching, directing the Music Industry Studies program and continuing to inspire students in the classroom. His work earned him multiple honors, including the Student Government Association Excellence in Teaching Award (2001) and the School of Music Excellence in Teaching Award (2002). In 2003, he co-authored the music appreciation textbook Crossroads in Music: Traditions and Connections.

== Personal life ==
Unsworth and his wife, Shirley, were members of The Church of Jesus Christ of Latter-day Saints and, at the time of their passing in 2025, were survived by their six children and 17 grandchildren.
