= Appalachian State University Marching Mountaineers =

College marching band in Boone, North Carolina

Marching Mountaineers North Carolina's Band of Distinction
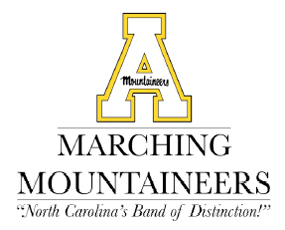
- School: Appalachian State University, Hayes School of Music
- Location: Boone, North Carolina, USA
- Conference: Sun Belt Conference
- Founded: 1933
- Director: Dr. Jason Gardner
- Members: 285
- Fight song: "Hi Hi Yikas"
- Website: Marching Mountaineers Website

The Marching Mountaineers, also known as North Carolina's Band of Distinction, is the 285 member marching band of Appalachian State University. Founded in 1933, the band performs at all home Mountaineer football games and travels to select away games each year. The Marching Mountaineers were a participant in the 2006 and 2014 London New Year's Day Parades. The Band of Distinction also marched in the 2011 Cabalgata de Reyes in Madrid, Spain.

The Marching Mountaineers are represented in competitive indoor performing arts through the Appalachian Ascent Winterguard. Ascent competes in the CWEA and WGI circuits.

== History ==
The Term "North Carolina's Band of Distinction" was coined by Joe F. Phelps during his early years as the director of the Marching Mountaineers after receiving such positive press and reviews and growing the band from 80 to 220 in just a few years.

=== Traditions ===
- Around the Ladder - At the end of rehearsals, band members gather around the drum major podium and play the 'Hi Hi Yikas' fight song before being dismissed.
- Band Dismissal - At the end of every single rehearsal, game, etc. a sousaphone player plays an ascending lick and the band members respond with a loud "Oh!" A euphonium places a descending lick and the band yells "Woah!". (Defunct)
- The Swinging A - During the Pregame show, the band forms a block 'A' on the field during a swing section of the show.
- Post Game Concert - After every game that the band attends, they will play 3 songs from the stands: You Can Call Me Al, The House of the Rising Sun, and The Tennessee Waltz.
- Pre-Game Concert - Before every home game, the band will perform a concert outside of the School of Music on Walker lawn. This used to be the bands Warm-up, but has turned into a concert including the Pre-Game Show, selections from Halftime, and usually ends with the Tennessee Waltz.
- Sousa Prayer - After the Pre-Game concert, the Sousaphone players and alumni will gather near the entrance to the school of music, form a circle, and sway back and forth while an upperclassman or alumni hypes up the section.

=== Directors ===
| Name | Years |
|---|---|
| Mr. Joe F. Phelps | 1971–1986 |
| Dr. Joe Brashier | 1987–1991 |
| Dr. Jay C. Jackson | 1992–1999 |
| Dr. Dawn Perry | 2000 (Interim) |
| Dr. Scott C. Tobias | 2001–2011 |
| Mr. Donald E. Peach | 2012 (Interim) |
| Dr. Kevin G. Richardson | 2013–2017 |
| Mr. Donald E. Peach | 2018 (Interim) |
| Dr. Jason P. Gardner | 2019–Present |

== Songs ==
The Band of Distinction performs a Pre-game show about 20 minutes before kickoff. The show begins with a Simple Gifts fanfare which then rolls into the song Carolina Pride. The band then performs the fight song America the Beautiful and the national anthem while the Colors are Presented followed by the Appalachian State Alma Mater, Cherished Vision. The band then marches towards the fieldhouse playing "Go Appalachian" to prepare for the entrance of the football team. The band's post-game show after every football includes Paul Simon's "You Can Call Me Al," "The House of the Rising Sun" as made famous by The Animals and "The Tennessee Waltz." The Waltz, as it is known by members, was added as a standard of the band in the 1970s by Director Joe Phelps, when the fans began requesting the song be played after every game after it was played as part of a halftime show. The show used to include songs from their halftime repertoire along with several other tunes.

== In the stands ==
Music performed in the stands consists of:

- The fight song, Hi Hi Yikas, played when the football team scores or wins. Different lengths of the song are played when needed
- The Olympic Fanfare (Buglers Dream), is played before every Mountaineer kickoff
- Go Appalachian
- Short lines of music are played during 1st, 2nd, and 3rd downs. They consist of parts of Hi Hi Yikas and the Simple Gifts fanfare
- Mortal Kombat, Dies irae, and Mars are played during defensive downs
- Short and Alumni Cheers
  - Low Brass Cheer which starts with the low brass and adds on trumpet and mello parts. The woodwinds usually chant "Oh-Yeah" or scream while dancing as they do not play
  - Trombone Cheer
  - Trumpet Charge, begins as a bugle call that adds other parts on top the second time played.
- Various other songs
  - In 2021 songs such as Neck by Cameo and Confident by Demi Lavato were played in the stands

== Instrumentation ==
The Marching Mountaineers are divided into the following sections:

- Piccolos
- Clarinets
- Saxophones, consisting of both Alto and Tenor Saxes
- Mellophones
- Trumpets
- Trombones, known as The Dawg Pound
- Euphoniums, known as The Hoochies
- Sousaphones, known as the Thunder of the Mountains
- Snares
- Tenors
- Bass drums
- Cymbals
- Front ensemble
- Color guard

== Appalachian Marching Band Festival ==
The Appalachian Marching Band Festival, is a competition hosted by the Marching Mountaineers for high school marching bands every fall in Kidd Brewer Stadium on the campus of Appalachian State University. The Competition, founded in 1979, is organized by the Rho Tau chapter of Phi Mu Alpha Sinfonia, provides these bands a performance venue where they are critiqued by a panel of nationally recognized adjudicators and a chance to perform in a collegiate stadium. The top band of the day receives the Chancellors Cup which is sponsored and presented by the chancellor of Appalachian State University. The chancellor, Sheri Everts, refused to sponsor the cup beginning in 2015 and the cup was renamed to the Sinfonian's Cup. The festival has been on hiatus since 2019 due to construction around the stadium and COVID-19.

== Controversy ==
=== University of Miami - Appalachian State Color Guard Allegations ===
On Saturday September 18, 2016 the Mountaineers football team hosted a Power 5 conference member for the first time with the University of Miami. In front of a record high crowd, it also marked the first time they hosted a top 25 opponent and the main ESPN network would broadcast an Appalachian State home game. Local media outlets dubbed it "the biggest event ever to take place in Boone."

Several hours after the game, Sophie Randleman alleged on a public social media post that members of the Marching Mountaineers color guard were "assaulted...groped, sworn at, taunted, and touched in ways that were definitely not asked for" when Miami's football team ran on to take the field for their pregame prayer. No incidents were reported to police onsite. Prior to kickoff, the Mountaineers Color Guard had positioned themselves into the visiting team's sideline in the direct path of where Miami's players and its staff were instructed to go. Randleman widely publicized her post and accused Miami of other incidents without specifying where or when they occurred. After learning of the allegations, Miami's athletic department opened a formal investigation.

In an interview with the Palm Beach Post two days later, Randleman failed to provide any witnesses to corroborate detail towards the allegations when provided a link to a video where no members of the Marching Mountaineers could be seen falling to the turf. She nor any other members of the Marching Mountaineers could provide descriptions, jersey numbers, or last names of any of the alleged Miami players. Three days after the incident, Randleman told CBS that they had not yet met with police, despite video showing several police officers and emergency medical staff visible near the color guard during the pregame that would have been witnesses. Boone police told local news High County Times that there were no issues surrounding the game. Six videos of Miami's entrance shot by fans, ESPN, and press media showed no indication of Randleman's allegations.

Following Randleman's CBS interview, Miami's Athletic Director announced that they had found zero evidence and were concluding their investigation after "a school review of multiple videos and social media posts and interviews with possible witnesses revealed no evidence of wrongdoing by (Miami) players." Appalachian State subsequently closed their investigation as well after it was unable to find any credible evidence backing up Randleman's claims. Appalachian State's Associate Athletics Director Zeke Beam noted that "the University of Miami went above and beyond to review the incident."

== Gallery ==
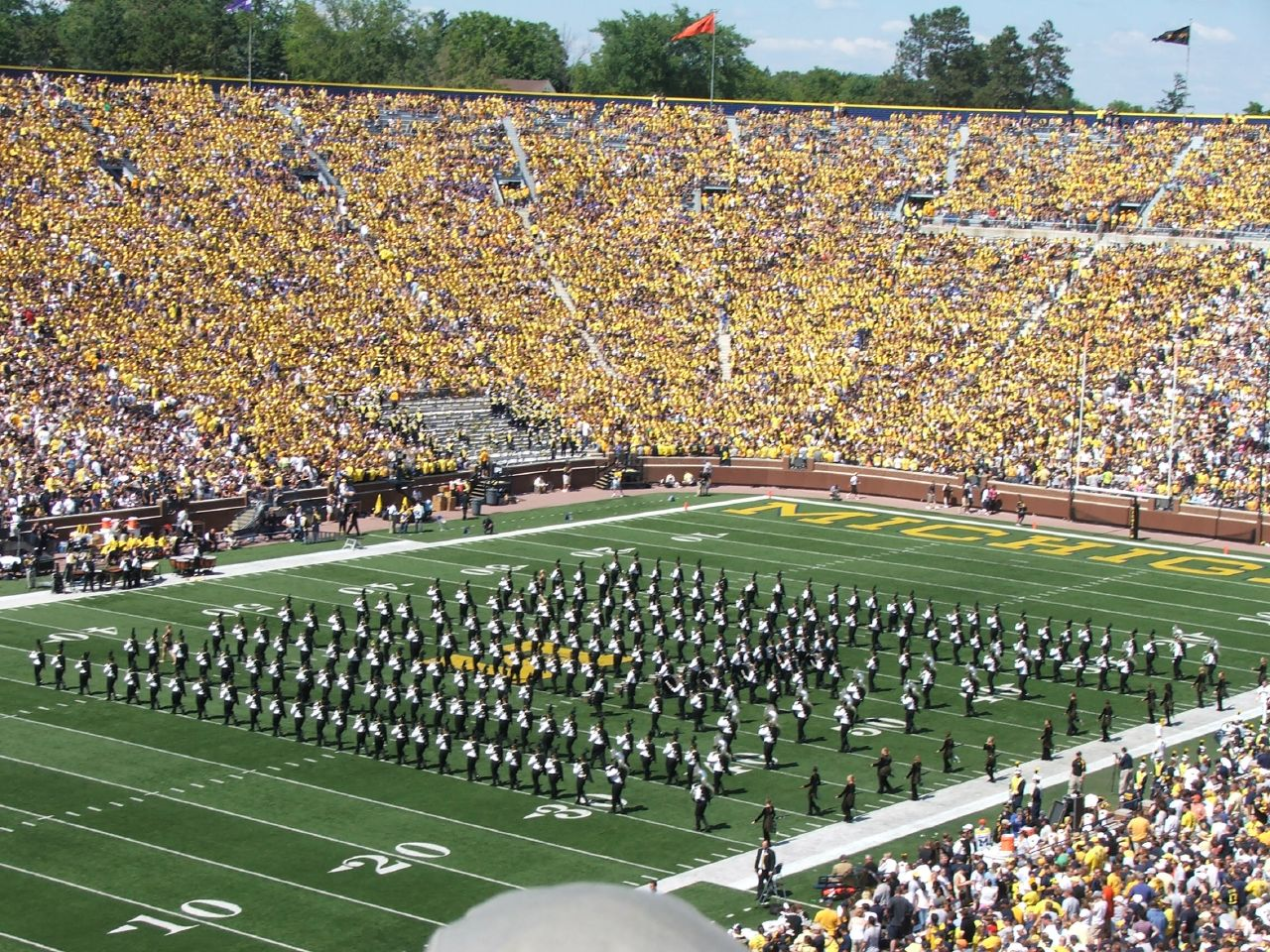
The Marching Mountaineers performing in Michigan Stadium. New uniforms will be used in 2009.

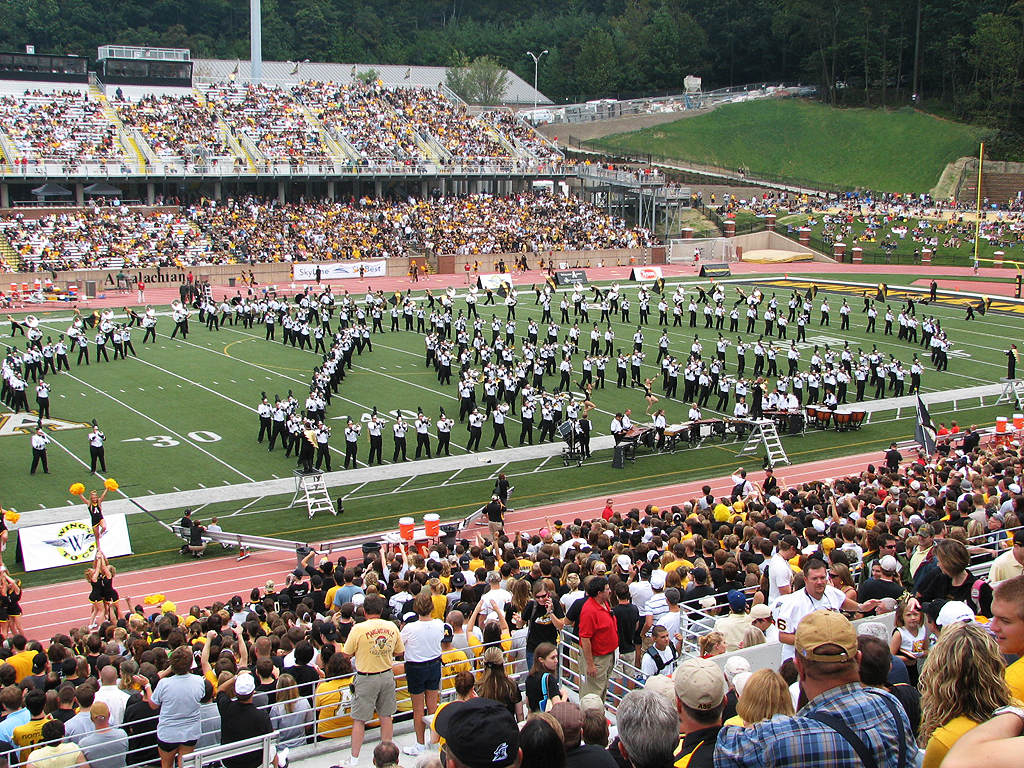
The Marching Mountaineers performing in Kidd Brewer Stadium.
