= Gary L. Rhodes =

American college president

Dr. Gary L. Rhodes was the president of J. Sargeant Reynolds Community College from October 2002 to September 2018.

== Previous Positions ==
Rhodes was president of Riverland Community College in Austin, Minnesota from August 15, 1998 to October 15, 2002. Prior to this position, Rhodes was vice president and chief academic officer of York County Technical College in Maine from 1994 to 1998, and he was also vice president of training and development at the United Education Institute in Santa Ana, California from 1990 to 1994. Before that, Rhodes served as executive vice president of accreditation for the Accrediting Council for Continuing Education and Training from 1988 to 1990, a national accrediting body then located in Richmond. He has also held additional administrative and adjunct faculty posts with the Maricopa County Community College District in Phoenix, Arizona.

== Education ==
Receiving his bachelor's degree from Southeast Missouri State University, Rhodes completed his master's degree in Spanish linguistics and literature and doctorate in higher and adult education at Arizona State University
