= Joe Mason (aid worker) =

American politician

Joe J. Mason was Recreation Director for the City of Miami, Florida in the 1940s and 1950s. He volunteered during World War II to be an American Red Cross Field Director and serve overseas. He was first assigned to England and developed the Servicemen Center in Bristol, England. When the invasion of North Africa began, he was attached to the 9th Infantry Division commanded by General M. S. Eddy. During the African campaign he supported the troops by providing club facilities and services to the troops, both American and British. As a result of his efforts in both Africa and Sicily (1943), he was directed to receive the Medal of Freedom by the president (1945).

The letter from the War Department was based on order # AGPD-C 095 Mason, Joe J. (17 December 1945). The citation read:

For exceptionally meritorius [sic] conduct in the performanceof [sic] outstanding services in the Mediterranean Theater of Operations from 20 March to 21 December 1943. During the Battle of El Quettar, and during the advance from Sedjenane to Bizerte in North Africa, and during the Sicilian campaign from Tronia to Randazzo, Mr. Mason performed his duties as a field director of the American Red Cross, attached to the 9th Infantry Division, with energy and loyalty far above that which might normally have been expected of him. On several occasions driving a jeep alone, he carried supplies to leading elements of the division while they were actively engaged with the enemy and in frequent danger from enemy air attack. His administration of Red Cross affairs and his supervision of other Red Cross personnel attached to the division was at all times superior. He often worked night and day without regard for his personal rest and comfort, on individual welfare matters and in the organization of Red Cross club and recreational facilities. Mr. Mason's constant cheerfulness, generosity, and devotion to duty were a great credit to himself and to the American Red Cross.
