= Mark Naufel =

American university president (born 1991)

President of the University of Silicon Valley
- Incumbent
- Assumed office October 2025

Personal details
- Born: November 26, 1991 (age 34) Tempe, Arizona, U.S.
- Education: Arizona State University (BS, MS, PhD)

Mark Naufel (born November 26, 1991) is an American university president and entrepreneur. He has been President of the University of Silicon Valley since October 2025.

== Education ==
Naufel received his undergraduate and graduate education at Arizona State University. He earned a Bachelor of Science in Finance, two master's degrees in Business Analytics and Systems Engineering, and a Ph.D. in Human Systems Engineering in 2020.

== Career ==
=== Arizona State University ===
As an undergraduate, Naufel served as Student Body President at Arizona State University's Tempe campus. In 2014, he was appointed by Arizona Governor Jan Brewer to serve as Student Regent on the Arizona Board of Regents, a position he held until 2016.

Following his graduate work, Naufel joined Arizona State University's faculty as a Professor of Practice. He established the Luminosity Lab, a research program involving students from multiple academic disciplines.

In 2020, a student team from the Luminosity Lab won the XPRIZE Next-Gen Mask Challenge.

=== Axio ===
Naufel founded an educational technology company called Primer, which was later renamed Axio. The company develops learning management software.

=== University of Silicon Valley ===
In October 2025, Naufel was appointed President of the University of Silicon Valley.

== Publications ==
Naufel has published research on educational innovation models. His work includes:

- Naufel, M. (2020). "The Luminosity Lab—An Interdisciplinary Model of Discovery and Innovation for the 21st Century." Technology and Innovation, 21(2), 115-121.
