= University of Louisville College of Business =

Coordinates: 38.21574°N 85.76112°W

University of Louisville School of Business
- Type: Public
- Established: 1953
- Parent institution: University of Louisville
- Dean: Amy Henley
- Students: Approx. 2,500
- Location: Louisville, Kentucky, U.S.
- USNWR Ranking: 133
- Website: business.louisville.edu

The University of Louisville College of Business is a college at the University of Louisville, established in 1953. The college is accredited by the Association to Advance Collegiate Schools of Business (AACSB). The college enrolls about 2,500 students in a variety of undergraduate, graduate and doctoral programs and various certificates in business fields including equine industry business, distilled spirits and franchise management.

Amy Henley has served as the college's dean since July 2025, replacing Interim Dean Jeff Guan.

According to the U.S. News & World Report Business School rankings in 2023, UofL Business is ranked 133 nationally and 75% of its graduates are employed upon graduation.

== History ==
The College of Business was founded in 1953. Carolyn Callahan served as the college's first woman and first African American to lead the college for the 2013–2014 academic year before stepping down. Rohan Christie-David took over as interim dean, serving in that role until 2016.

Neeli Bendapudi, a business scholar and UofL president from 2018 to 2021, served in a dual role as a faculty member of the College of Business.
