= University of Silicon Valley =

For-profit university in San Jose, California

- Former names: Cogswell Polytechnical College (1887–2021); University of Silicon Valley (2021–Present)
- Type: Private for-profit university
- Established: March 19, 1887; 139 years ago
- President: Mark Naufel
- Faculty: 11 full-time 64 part-time
- Students: 434 (Fall 2021)
- Undergraduates: 425 (Fall 2021)
- Postgraduates: 9 (Fall 2021)
- Location: San Jose, California, California, United States; 37.4102°N 121.942°W
- Colors: Orange and White
- Mascot: Dragon
- Website: usv.edu

The University of Silicon Valley (USV) is a private for-profit university in San Jose, California, in Silicon Valley. The school was founded in 1887 as Cogswell Polytechnical College. It was the first technical training institution in the Western United States and one of only two private universities, along with Stanford University, that were originally guaranteed a tax exemption in the California Constitution. USV is accredited by the WASC Senior College and University Commission. Programs at USV range from digital media to engineering, with an emphasis on digital animation, audio and music production, and video game design.

== History ==
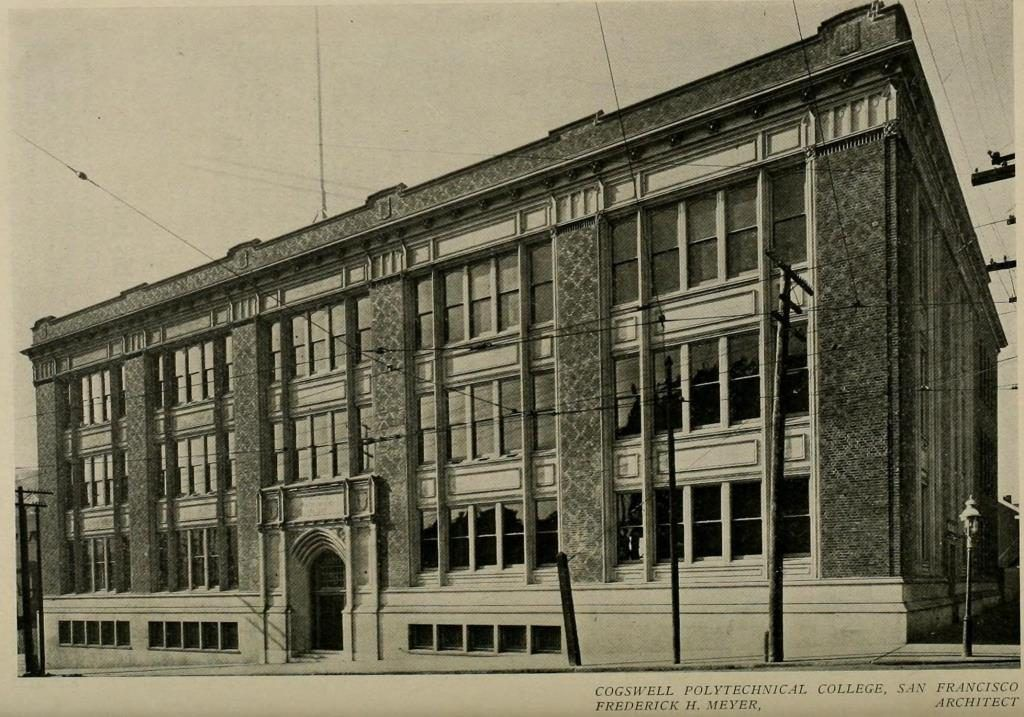
The former Cogswell College campus in 1905.

The University of Silicon Valley was founded as a high school on March 19, 1887, by Henry D. Cogswell in San Francisco. It opened in August 1888, offering technical classes for boys and business classes for girls. On June 30, 1930, it became a technical college. It was the first technical training institution in the Western United States.

The original campus building was occupied in 1888 in the Mission District in San Francisco. When the 1906 earthquake partially destroyed the campus, the College relocated across the street to an existing home. After the City of San Francisco purchased some of the land by eminent domain in 1917, a new building was constructed at Folsom Street and 26th Street in San Francisco to house the school.

In 1974, having outgrown the existing campus, the college moved to a location at Stockton and California Streets. In 1985, it moved to Cupertino, where it remained until 1994 (its old San Francisco building became a Ritz Carlton hotel). In 1993, the college purchased a campus in Sunnyvale, which it moved to in 1994. This campus was sold in 2012, and in 2015 the college moved to a leased building in San Jose.

=== Modern history ===
In 2010 the college was acquired by Palm Ventures, a private equity firm. The following year Charles "Chuck" House, executive director of the Media X program at Stanford University, became chancellor. Deborah Snyder was appointed president of the college in 2014. As of 2018, the current Chief Executive Officer is Charles Restivo. As a result of the acquisition, the college lost its original property tax exemption as a non-profit institution.

In April 2021, the university was renamed "University of Silicon Valley".

== Academics ==
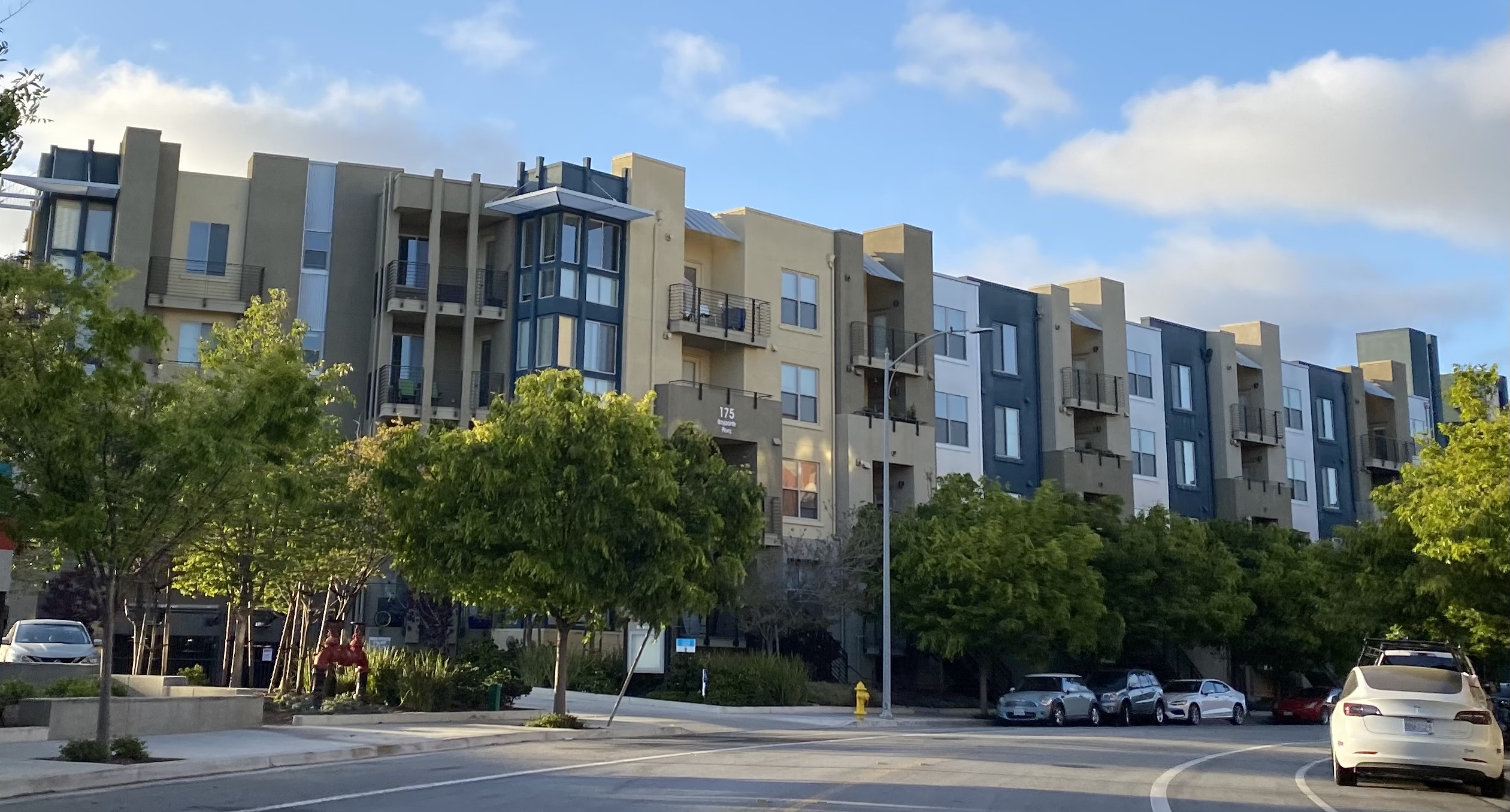
The Enso, located next to the USV campus on Baypointe Parkway, is used for student housing.

The University of Silicon Valley offers the Bachelor of Arts (B.A.), Bachelor of Science (B.S.), and Master of Arts (M.A.) degrees and specializes in digital animation, video game design and audio & music production.

Its computer graphics degree program includes Project X, an animated film production course that approximates the experience of interning in the industry, and MediaWorks, an audio-visual concepting and production course where students work on projects in collaboration with outside organizations.

In November 2007, USV announced the addition of a minor in business management. In January 2011 Cogswell started its entrepreneurship program; it expanded this in 2012 into a Master's program in Entrepreneurship and Innovation.

== Campus ==
The University of Silicon Valley is located in San Jose, California, in Silicon Valley. Student housing is spread across North San Jose.

== Student outcomes ==
According to the College Scorecard, the school has a 46% 8-year graduation rate. In 2021, the median salary after attending was $61,619.

== Notable alumni ==
- John Oceguera, former Speaker of the Nevada Assembly
- Gertrude Boyle Kanno, American sculptor
- DJ Qbert, Filipino musician
