= Hayes School of Music =

Music school of the Appalachian State University

Coordinates: 36.2159°N 81.6844°W

The Mariam Cannon Hayes School of Music is the music school of Appalachian State University, a public university in Boone, North Carolina. It is accredited by the National Association of Schools of Music and offers undergraduate programs as well as Master's degree programs. The Hayes school of music is housed within the Broyhill Music Center, a 90,000+ square foot complex.

== History ==
=== Pre-UNC System ===
The first music teacher at what was to become Appalachian State University was Lillie Shull Daugherty, the wife of University Business Manager and Co-founder D.D. Dougherty. From its beginning, Appalachian State University offered students instruction in voice and piano on an extracurricular basis, and by the late 1920s, choruses, glee clubs, and string bands were flourishing on the campus of what was then Appalachian State Teachers College. Students' increased interest in music led to Edith Knight joining the music faculty, and she broadened the musical offerings to include music education, music appreciation, and additional applied music courses.

Knight was succeeded by Virginia Ward Linney in 1929, and the educational need to prepare specialists to teach music in the public schools led, a year later, to the creation of the Music Department, with Linney serving as chairperson. Soon afterward, courses in harmony, music education, music history and applied music were added to the curriculum. During the Depression years, when enrollment of the university fluctuated between 350 and 900 students in any given year, the college and surrounding area faced hard times. In spite of this, the Music Department continued to expand. More courses were added in order to educate music teachers with an emphasis on excellence in performance. To further this end, in 1939, Gordon Nash and J. Elwood Roberts began teaching band and orchestral instrument methods classes. Two years later, Roy R. Blanton and John B. Thompson were recipients of the first music education degrees conferred by Appalachian.

As with other American colleges and universities in the early 1940s, Appalachian State Teachers College and its Music Department experienced reduced enrollment and a preponderantly female population (Note the number of women in the chamber orchestra photo from 1942). "The war has taken about all our boys," lamented university co-founder and president B.B. Dougherty in 1944.

Postwar years, on the other hand, brought a time of growth and new enthusiasm at Appalachian as returning servicemen altered the demographics and psychology of the nation. In 1952, with Gordon Nash now at the helm, the Appalachian State Teachers College Music Department moved into a new fine arts building, and in 1953, the department joined the National Association of Schools of Music.

From 1958 to 1972, during the tenure of William G. Spencer as Music Department chairman, Appalachian experienced considerable growth in both the number of students and the number of faculty. Student enrollment soared to above 2400 in 1958, only to double to over 5000 by 1968. In 1967, Appalachian, now officially Appalachian State University, became a regional university. Nicholas Erneston was appointed Dean of the newly organized College of Fine and Applied Arts (which included the Music Department), and in 1969 a proposal was presented to the North Carolina General Assembly to construct on campus a fine arts complex which would include an auditorium and buildings for art, music, speech, and drama.

=== UNC System to present ===
With the induction of Appalachian State University into the University of North Carolina system in 1972, Chancellor Herbert W. Wey encouraged faculty members to be as creative as they dared. The Music Department met the challenge both with the engagement of world-class performers as applied music faculty, as well as with an explosion of creative ideas, enlivening the curriculum. One such campus-wide experiment from that era that continues to the present day is Watauga College, a residential college with enhanced faculty-student relationships and interdisciplinary studies, which exists in an arts-centered environment within the greater university. The college, located near the School of Music, has served as the home for many of Appalachian's music students. Two other important developments of this period were the establishment of Appalachian's New York Loft and the now-defunct Appalachian House in Washington, D.C. These off-campus living environments are available to music students and faculty to pursue off-campus artistic and scholarly field trips and musical opportunities.

The current music complex, the Broyhill Music Center, was completed in the spring of 1983. The Music Center includes two performance spaces, a 125-seat Recital Hall and 440-seat Concert Hall, a recording studio, an opera studio, a MIDI/electronic music studio, a piano lab, a 5,000-square-foot (460 m^{2}) music library, an instrumental rehearsal hall, a choral rehearsal hall, several small ensemble rehearsal rooms, more than 30 studio/offices and over 40 practice rooms.

In May 2001, the late Mariam Cannon Hayes of Concord, North Carolina, who was a longtime patron of the arts and ardent supporter of the music program at Appalachian State University, made a $10 million endowment gift to the School of Music. Proceeds from her endowment fund current and future needs of the school and also provide funding for scholarly research and performance. Subsequently, the Appalachian State University board of trustees named the school in her honor.

== Leadership ==
In 1988, the artistic and academic growth of the Department of Music resulted in its expansion into an autonomous School of Music (and separation from the College of Fine and Applied Arts). In 1989, Arthur Unsworth was named as the first dean of the School of Music. From the beginning of the 21st-century to June 30, 2009, the composer William Harbinson, an alumnus of Appalachian, served as dean of the School of Music. William Pelto, music theorist and former associate dean of the Ithaca College School of Music, served as the Hayes School's dean from July 2009 through June 2017, after which he served as executive director of The College Music Society. James Douthit, a graduate of the Eastman School of Music (University of Rochester) currently serves as dean of the School of Music.

== Academics ==
Currently, the Hayes School of Music offers 4 different undergraduate degrees: music performance, music education, music therapy, and music industry studies. Performance, Education, and Music Industry Studies all have concentrations. The school also offers 3 graduate degrees: Music Performance, Music Therapy, and Music Theory Pedagogy Research & Practice Certificate. The school offers no doctoral degrees.

== Facilities ==
Below is a list of facilities within the Broyhill Music Center, and utilized by the Hayes School of Music.

- Rosen Concert Hall, a 440-seat performance space
- Schaffel Recital Hall, a 125-seat performance space
- Main Instrumental Rehearsal Room (called 119 by students, staff, and alumni in reference to the room number)
- Nicholas Erneston Music Library
- Main Vocal Rehearsal Room (called 214 by students, staff, and alumni in reference to the room number)
- Jazz Rehearsal Room
- Opera Rehearsal Room
- Robert F. Gilley Recording Studio
- Electronic Music Lab

== Student organizations ==
The Hayes School of Music is home to many student organizations, including educational, fraternal, and co-curricular activities:

=== Educational ===
- North Carolina Music Educators Association (NCMEA)
- College Music Society (CMS)
- Music & Entertainment Industry Student Association (MEISA)
- Appalachian Music Therapy Student Association (AMTSA)
- American Choral Directors' Association (ACDA)
- American String Teachers' Association (ASTA) - National
- American String Teachers' Association (ASTA) - North Carolina
- National Association for Music Education (NAfME)

=== Fraternal ===
- Phi Mu Alpha Sinfonia
- Kappa Kappa Psi
- Sigma Alpha Iota
- Phi Kappa Lambda

=== Co-curricular ===
- Marching Mountaineers
- Split Rail Records
- Appalachian Ascent Winterguard
