= Reza Hamzaee =

Iranian-American economist

Reza G. Hamzaee
- Born: May 7, 1951 (age 75)

Academic background
- Education: Arizona State University
- Awards: Foundation Award for Teaching Excellence, Dr. James V. Mehl Outstanding Faculty Scholarship Award

Reza G. Hamzaee (Persian: رضا حمزه‌ای, born 7 May 1951) is an Iranian-American economist and BOG-Distinguished Professor of Economics at Missouri Western State University. He is known for his research on banking and managerial economics.
