= Trish Corner =

American-New Zealand academic

Patricia Doyle Corner
- Education: Arizona State University
- Scientific career
- Fields: Strategic entrepreneurship
- Workplaces: Auckland University of Technology, University of British Columbia
- Thesis: Related acquisition choice quality : an interpretive process explanation (1993)

Patricia Doyle Corner is an American-New Zealand academic. She was a full professor of strategic entrepreneurship at the Auckland University of Technology before moving to the University of British Columbia.

== Academic career ==
After completing a 1993 PhD titled Related acquisition choice quality: an interpretive process explanation at Arizona State University, she moved to the University of Waikato, rising to full professor, and then to the University of British Columbia.

== Selected works ==
- Corner, Patricia Doyle, and Marcus Ho. "How opportunities develop in social entrepreneurship." Entrepreneurship Theory and Practice 34, no. 4 (2010): 635–659.
- Corner, Patricia Doyle, Angelo J. Kinicki, and Barbara W. Keats. "Integrating organizational and individual information processing perspectives on choice." Organization Science 5, no. 3 (1994): 294–308.
- Corner, James L., and Patricia D. Corner. "Characteristics of decisions in decision analysis practice." Journal of the Operational Research Society 46, no. 3 (1995): 304–314.
- Singh, Smita, Patricia Doyle Corner, and Kathryn Pavlovich. "Failed, not finished: A narrative approach to understanding venture failure stigmatization." Journal of Business Venturing 30, no. 1 (2015): 150–166.
- Corner, Patricia Doyle. "Workplace spirituality and business ethics: Insights from an eastern spiritual tradition." Journal of Business Ethics 85, no. 3 (2009): 377–389.
