= Valerie Matsumoto =

Historian

Valerie J. Matsumoto is a historian specializing in Asian American history, women's history, and oral history at the University of California, Los Angeles (UCLA). In 2017 she was named the George and Sakaye Aratani Endowed Chair on the Japanese American Incarceration, Redress, and Community.

== Education and career ==
Matsumoto has a bachelor's degree from Arizona State University. She then moved to Stanford University where she received a master's degree. She earned her Ph.D. in U.S. History from Stanford University in 1985.

In 2017 she was appointed to the George and Sakaye Aratani Endowed Chair on the Japanese American Incarceration, Redress, and Community.

== Selected publications ==
Densho calls Matusumoto "our community's most dedicated chronicler of Japanese American women's history."

Matsumoto published her first book, Farming the Home Place in 1993. City Girls: The Nisei Social World in Los Angeles, 1920–1950 was published in 2014. In addition, she co-edited with Blake Allmendinger the anthology Over the Edge: Remapping the American West that was published in 1999.

== Honors and awards ==
Matsumoto has been recognized with the C. Doris and Toshio Hoshide Distinguished Teaching Prize in 2006 and the UCLA Distinguished Teaching Award in 2007.
