= Katrina Johnston-Zimmerman =

American anthropologist

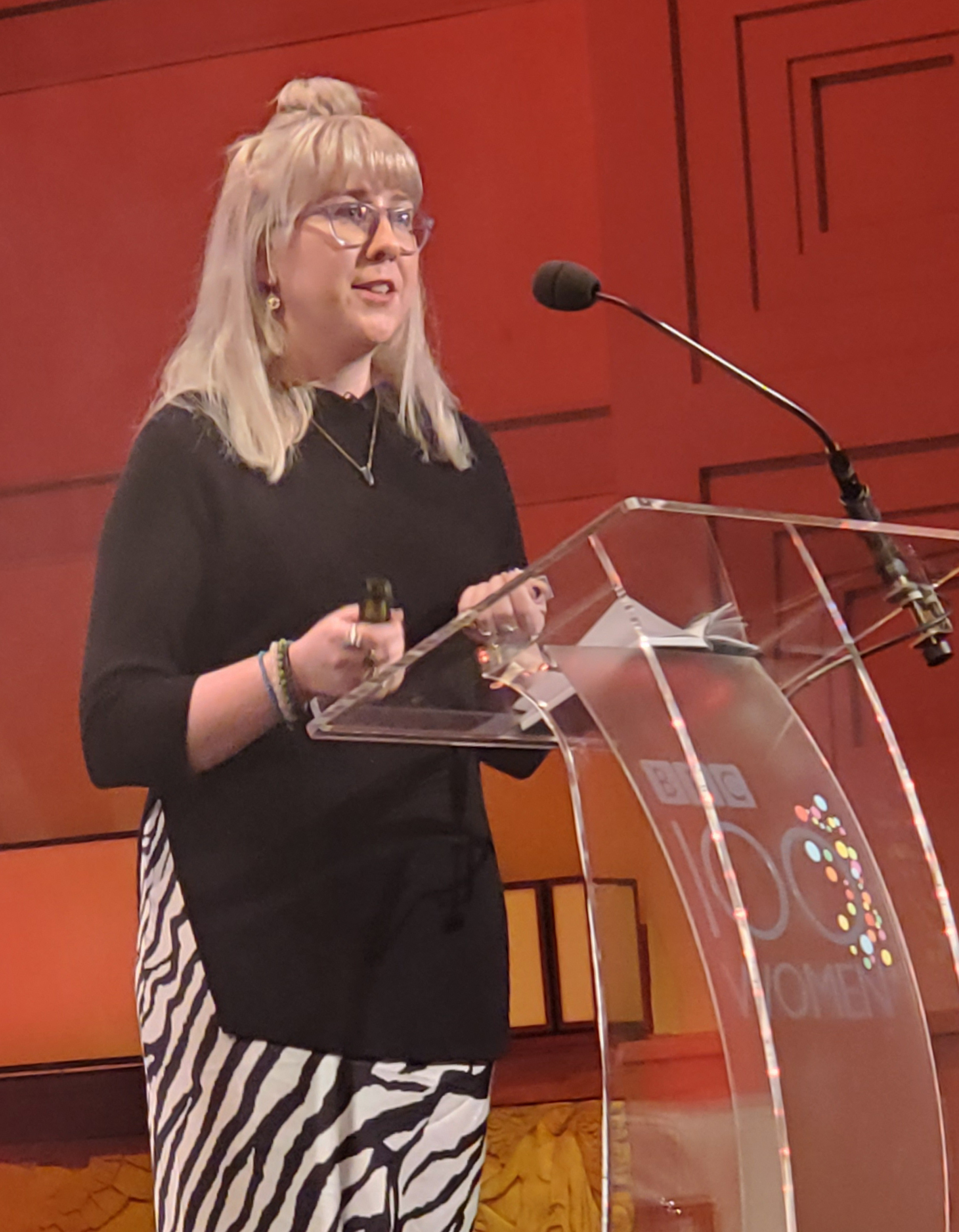
Katrina Johnston-Zimmerman at BBC Radio Theatre in October 2019

Katrina Johnston-Zimmerman is an American urban anthropologist. She co-founded The Women Led Cities Initiative. She was named to 2019 100 Women (BBC).

== Life ==
She graduated from Arizona State University, and Portland State University.

She studies human behavior in public space. She is a lecturer at Drexel University. She is guest lecturer at the KTH Royal Institute of Technology. She led a Women Led Cities Initiative project for Philadelphia.

Her work appeared in Next City, and op-ed appeared in The Philadelphia Inquirer.
