= Kate Holbrook =

American historian and writer (1972–2022)

- Born: January 13, 1972; Santa Barbara, California, U.S.
- Died: August 20, 2022 (aged 50); Salt Lake City, Utah, U.S.
- Spouse: Samuel Brown (m. 1998)
- Children: 3

Kathleen Holbrook (January 13, 1972 – August 20, 2022) was an American historian and writer. She worked as the managing historian of women's history in the Church History Department (CHD) of the Church of Jesus Christ of Latter-day Saints (LDS Church).

== Early life ==
Holbrook was born in Santa Barbara, California, on January 13, 1972, to Kathleen Stewart and Robert Holbrook. Her father left the family six weeks after she was born, and she was raised by her mother and grandmother, Belle Fillmore Stewart. Her mother later moved to Utah and Holbrook attended schools in Provo. After serving as an LDS Church missionary in Samara, Russia, she studied at Brigham Young University. Holbrook then obtained a Master of Divinity from Harvard Divinity School, before being awarded a Doctor of Philosophy in religious studies from Boston University.

== Career ==
Holbrook's primary research interests were focused on religion, gender, and food. She was the first recipient of the Eccles Fellowship in Mormon Studies at the University of Utah. While at Harvard College, she was voted Teaching Fellow of the Year.

=== Church History Department ===
When she was hired by the CHD in 2011, Holbrook became the first historian hired to specialize in women's history. Historians Jennifer Reeder and Brittany Chapman Nash were later hired to join the research team. During her time in the CHD, the LDS Church has seen the role of women expand and evolve. This includes prayers offered by women in the church's general conferences, leadership assignments on executive councils, and writings about Heavenly Mother. Holbrook was a collaborator on The First Fifty Years of Relief Society, a collection of original documents that explores nineteenth-century history of the Relief Society—the women's organization of the LDS Church. Along with Matthew Bowman, she also edited Women and Mormonism, a collection of primary documents and oral histories exploring perspectives of Latter-day Saint women.

In 2017, At the Pulpit: 185 Years of Discourses by Latter-Day Saint Women, which was co-edited by Reeder, was published to document public prayers and preaching of 54 women—including biographical information and the context of the material.

=== Posthumous Work ===
On August 1, 2023, nearly one year after her death, BYU Maxwell Institute and Deseret Book Company published Holbrook’s book Both Things Are True. The book consists of five essays examining a series of seemingly contrary ideas that Holbrook suggests Latter-day Saints hold in tension as they navigate their faith.

== Personal life ==
Holbrook was married to Samuel Brown and they had three daughters. They met while she was studying in Boston and went back to Utah during their thirties.

After suffering from eye cancer, Holbrook died at age 50 on August 20, 2022, in Salt Lake City.

== Publications ==
- At the Pulpit: 185 Years of Discourses by Latter-Day Saint Women edited by Kate Holbrook and Jennifer Reeder (Church Historian's Press, March 1, 2017, ISBN 978-1629722825)
- The First Fifty Years of Relief Society: Key Documents in Latter-day Saint Women's History edited by Jill Mulvay Derr, Carol Cornwall Madsen, Kate Holbrook, and Matthew J. Grow (Church Historian's Press, February 19, 2016, ISBN 978-1629721507)
- Both Things Are True by Kate Holbrook (BYU Maxwell Institute and Deseret Book Company, August 1, 2023, ISBN 978-1639931804)
