= Joseph R. Mason =

American economist

Joseph R. Mason is an American economist and Russell B. Long Professor in Finance at E. J. Ourso College of Business. His research specializes on financial intermediation and economic growth, with more interest on financial innovation and the role it plays in economic expansions as well as financial crises.

== Former jobs ==
- The Hermann Moyse Jr./Louisiana Bankers Association Endowed Chair of Banking. (2008–2018)
- Associate professor at Drexel University (Around 2007)

== Education ==
- PhD Economics, University of Illinois, 1996
- MS Economics, University of Illinois, 1992
- BS Economics, Arizona State University, 1990
