= List of African American newspapers in Mississippi =

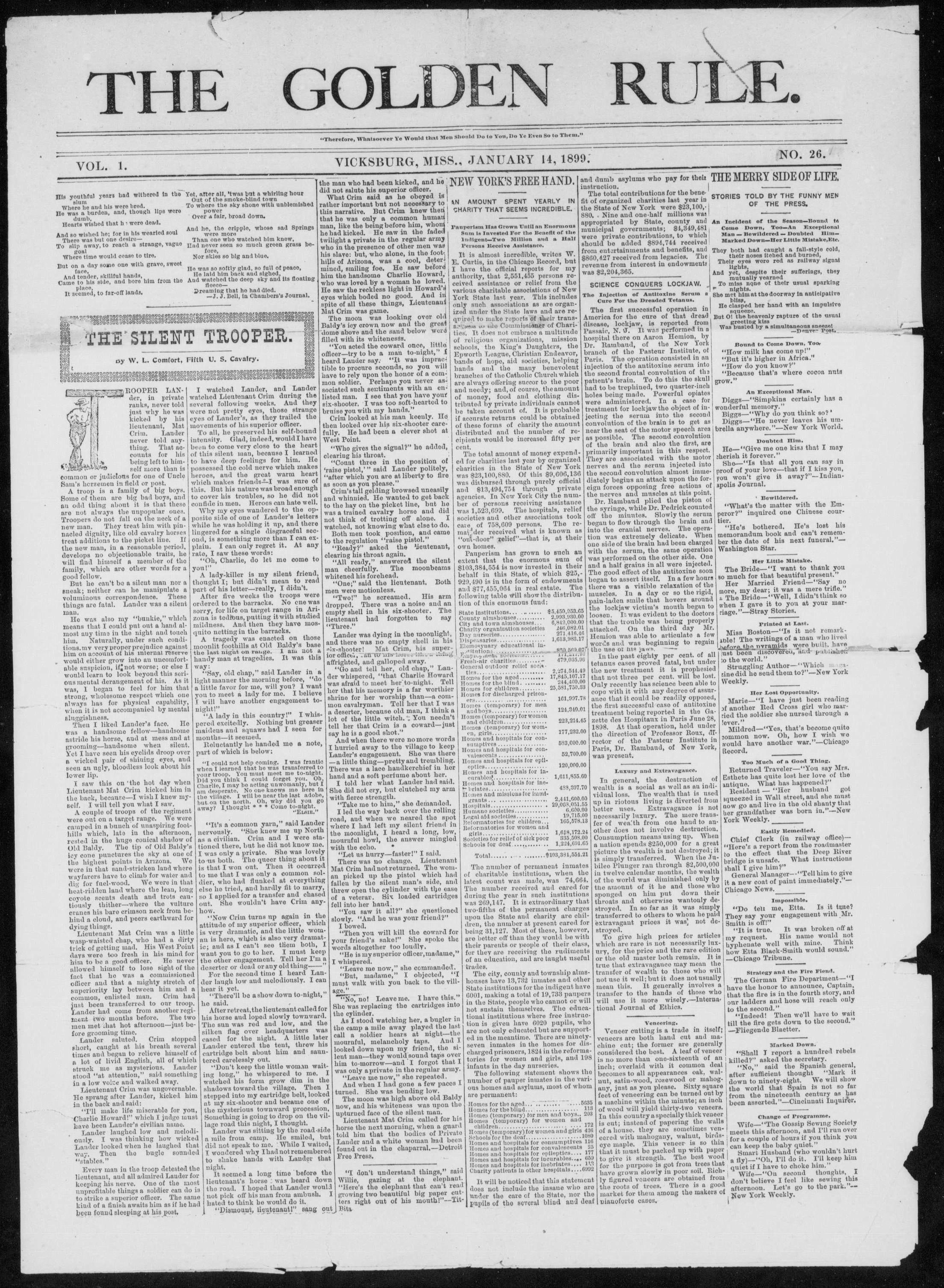
A surviving issue of the Vicksburg Golden Rule, from 1899.

This is a list of African American newspapers that have been published in Mississippi. It includes both current and historical newspapers.

The first such newspaper in Mississippi was the Colored Citizen in 1867. More than 70 African American newspapers were founded across Mississippi between 1867 and 1899, in at least 37 different towns. From 1900 to 1980, at least 116 more such newspapers were founded in the state, but increasingly concentrated in the larger cities. The Jackson Advocate is the oldest African American newspaper still in publication. The Mississippi Link was one of the first African American publications to be widely available on the internet.

Several African American newspapers are currently published in Mississippi. They are highlighted in green in the list below.

== Newspapers ==
City	Title	Beginning	End	Frequency	Call numbers	Remarks
Brandon	The Free State	1898	1904		LCCN sn84025823, 2011254379; OCLC 753811338, 10347200, 2747535	Edited by E.H. Johnson.
Brookhaven	People's Relief	1900s	1910			Edited by Eugene N. Bryant, who was driven from Brookhaven by white mob in retaliation for his political positions.
Canton	Canton Citizen	1869	?			
Cary	The Weekly Negro World	1890s	1900s		LCCN 2018270512; OCLC 1059131230	Free online archive; Attested through at least 1902.
Clarksdale	Tutwiler Whirlwind	1979			Edited in 1979 by J.D. Rayford.	
Columbia	Brotherhood	1976				
Fayette	Jefferson County Chronicle	1986	1992		LCCN sn87008338; OCLC 15492871; ISSN 0893-3693	
Greenville	The Delta Farmer’s Digest	1939	?		LCCN sn87065121; OCLC 15155327	Published by H.H. Humes Publishing Co.; Attested through at least 1948.
Greenville	The Delta Leader; Greenville Leader	1929 or 1930	?		LCCN sn87065122, sn87065125; OCLC 11955778, 15154937, 15155009	Free online archive; Published by H.H. Humes Publishing Co.; Attested through at least 1943.
Greenville	The Delta Lighthouse; Delta Light House	1896	1930 or 1920s		LCCN sn87065123; OCLC 15153806	Published by E.M. Weddington.; Edited by J.C. Chapple from 1896 until his death in 1919.
Greenville	Mississippi Freelance	1969	1970		LCCN sn88067142; OCLC 10393606, 9884940	Different color of paper used for each issue.
Greenville	Mississippi News	1974			Founded by Katie M. Johnson and David Johnson.	
Greenville	Mississippiana	1900s	1900s		LCCN sn87065127; OCLC 15155236	Attested from at least 1942.
Greenville	Negro Leader	1962			Founded by Albert Jenkins.	
Greenville	The Voice Of SHIMPH	1975	1900s		LCCN sn88067156; OCLC 18116579	
Greenville	The Zion Harp	1896	1910		LCCN sn87065129; OCLC 15160059	
Greenwood	The Baptist Observer	1960?	?			Published by General Missionary Baptist Convention of Mississippi. Edited by W.L. Terrell.
Hattiesburg	Hub City Community News	1984	1987		LCCN sn88067042; OCLC 17453254	Published by Eddie Taylor.
Hattiesburg	The Union Messenger	1934	1900s		LCCN sn88067122; OCLC 17779530	
Holly Springs	Mississippi Oddfellow	1908?	?			Edited by E.H. McKissak.; Attested through at least 1915.
Jackson	Jackson Advocate	1938 or 1939	current		LCCN sn79000083, sn79083; OCLC 11991797, 2173975, 4701538; ISSN 0047-1704	Official site; Free online archive
Jackson	Colored Citizen	1870	?			Founded by James J. Spelman and James D. Lynch.
Jackson	The Drummer; The Drummer: Mississippi’s Black Community Newspaper	1971	1900s		LCCN sn84025913; OCLC 10675658	
Jackson	Eagle Eye; The Eagle Eye	1944	1967?		OCLC 10379234	Published by Arrington High.; "The one radical journal of resistance" out of the five newspapers published in Mississippi in the 1950s.
Jackson	The Mississippi Enterprise	1938 or 1939	?		LCCN sn87065258; OCLC 15339733, 17654996	Published by Willie J. Miller.; Free online archive
Jackson	Mississippi Free Press	1961	1964		LCCN 2013254324, sn87065222; OCLC 15308525, 17268835, 2557042, 664611325; ISSN 2642-4673, 2642-5173	Played an important role in the civil rights movement as a newspaper willing to speak out against the power structure.
Jackson	Highlighter	1975			Founded by Gene L. Mosley.	
Jackson	Mississippi Independent	1967	1967?		OCLC 11620462	
Jackson	The Mississippi Link	1993	current			Official site; Published by L. Socrates Garrett.
Jackson	The Messenger	1800s	?		LCCN sn87065721; OCLC 16852687	
Jackson	Metropolitan Observer	1976			Founded by Lee Dilworth.	
Jackson	The New African	1900s	?		LCCN sn97047980; OCLC 36950698	Founded by Imari Obadele.; Attested in 1980s.
Jackson	People's Journal; People's Advisor; People's Defender	1877	1882?			
Jackson	Mississippi Weekly	1930s	1900s		LCCN 2013254325; OCLC 664611326	
Jackson	Jackson Field Hand	1870?				
Jackson	Weekly Communicator	1975			Founded by James H. Meredith and Louis Armstrong.	
Laurel	Voice Of The People	1900s	1900s		LCCN sn89065000; OCLC 19295684	Free online archive
McComb	Freedom's Journal	1964			Edited by Barbara JoAnn Lea.	
Meridian	The Echo	1923	1931		LCCN sn88067045; OCLC 17536875	
Meridian	The Echo	1942	1960		LCCN sn88067047; OCLC 17538016	Free online archive
Meridian	Mississippi Memo Digest	1968	?		LCCN sn97061107; OCLC 8100507	Attested through at least 1979.; Editor: Robert E. Williams.
Meridian	The Weekly Echo; Daily Echo	1931	1942		LCCN sn87065408; OCLC 15716025	Free online archive
Moss Point	Pas-Point Journal	1976			Founded by Bernard Barnes and E.V. Cole.	
Mound Bayou	Demonstrator	1900	1925?			Edited by Aurelius P. Hood.; Circulation of 4,000 in 1912.
Mound Bayou	Mound Bayou News-Digest	1900s	1900s		LCCN 2013254327, sn87065748; OCLC 17003814, 664611328; ISSN 2642-7737	Attested from at least 1948–1950.
Mound Bayou	The Mound Bayou Sentinel	1952	?		LCCN sn87065423; OCLC 15738763	
Mound Bayou	The Southern Advocate	1933	?		LCCN sn87082832; OCLC 15738677	Free online archive; Attested through at least 1940.
Mound Bayou	The Taborian Star	1923?	?			
Mound Bayou	The Voice	1900s	1900s		LCCN sn89065010; OCLC 17281773	Attested from at least 1970–1971.
Natchez	Bluff City Bulletin	1961	1966			Published by Savoy Publishing Company. Edited by Theodore C. Johnson.
Natchez	Bluff City Post	1978	current		LCCN sn87065425; OCLC 15748285	Founded by William H. Terrell and Theo C. Johnson.
Natchez	Natchez News Leader	1971	1983?		LCCN sn84025910; OCLC 10666378	Founded by William H. Terrell and Theo C. Johnson.
Natchez	Weekly Reporter	1909	1930s?			Owned and edited by Joseph A. Young, Jr.; Circulation may have reached 1500.
New Albany	The Community Citizen	1900s	1900s		LCCN sn88067103; OCLC 17388230	Free online archive; Attested from at least 1955–1959.
Senatobia	The Baptist Herald	1888	1800s		LCCN sn87065602; OCLC 16396263	Attested through at least 1891.
Vicksburg	Vicksburg Citizens' Appeal	1964	1967		LCCN sn84025911, sn94081987; OCLC 32351445, 10666472, 17271247, 8776650	
Vicksburg	Colored Citizen	1867	?			Founded by Vicksburg civic leader Henry Mason.
Vicksburg	The Golden Rule	1898	1902		LCCN 2012254012, 2018218508, sn84025825; OCLC 1018455604, 10354367, 2747444, 770730896; ISSN 2576-4667, 2576-4675	Free online archive
Vicksburg	The Light	1891	1900s		LCCN 2013254301, sn84025824; OCLC 10347312, 843951336	
Vicksburg	The New Times	1993?	?		OCLC 37378103	
Yazoo City	Afro-American Courier	1926	1957?		LCCN sn88067171; OCLC 18201922	Free online archive
Yazoo City	Century Voice; The Century Voice	1942	?		LCCN sn88067172; OCLC 18201974	Edited by T.J. Huddleston, Jr.; Free online archive

== See also ==
- List of African American newspapers and media outlets
- List of African American newspapers in Alabama
- List of African American newspapers in Arkansas
- List of African American newspapers in Louisiana
- List of African American newspapers in Tennessee
- List of newspapers in Mississippi

== Works cited ==
- Danky, James Philip; Hady, Maureen E., eds. (1998). African-American newspapers and periodicals : a national bibliography. Harvard University Press. ISBN 9780674007888.
- McMillen, Neil R. (1990). Dark Journey: Black Mississippians in the Age of Jim Crow. University of Illinois Press. ISBN 9780252061561.
- Pride, Armistead Scott; Wilson, Clint C. (1997). A History of the Black Press. Howard University Press. ISBN 9780882581927.
- Smith, Jessie Carney (2012). Black Firsts: 4,000 Ground-Breaking and Pioneering Historical Events. Visible Ink Press. ISBN 9781578593699.
- Thompson, Julius Eric (1983). "Mississippi". In Suggs, Henry Lewis (ed.). The Black Press in the South, 1865–1979. ISBN 9780313222443.
- Thompson, Julius Eric (2001). Black Life in Mississippi: Essays on Political, Social and Cultural Studies in a Deep South State. ISBN 9780761819226.
- Thompson, Julius Eric (2015). Lynchings in Mississippi (reprint ed.). ISBN 9780786464418.
