= Robert Stanton (Indiana politician) =

American dentist and politician

Representative Robert L. Stanton

Member of the Indiana House of Representatives from the Lake County district
- In office 1933–1937

Robert L. Stanton (born 1902) was a dentist and state politician in Indiana. He served two terms in the Indiana House of Representatives. He was elected in 1932 and 1934 from Lake County, Indiana. Born and raised in Arkansas, he earned his bachelor's and DDS degrees from Meharry Medical College. He set up a practice of dentistry in East Chicago.

Influential in recruiting black people to the Democratic Party in Lake County, Stanton in 1932 was one of the first two African Americans to be elected to the lower house of the Indiana legislature on the Democratic Party ticket. Henry J. Richardson Jr. of Indianapolis, an African-American lawyer, was also elected as a Democrat.

== Early life, education and marriage ==
Stanton was born on April 15, 1902, in Newport, Arkansas. He graduated from Newport High School, and subsequently attended Shorter College from 1917 to 1919 and Wilberforce University, a historically black college, from 1920 to 1922. He received his Bachelor of Science degree in 1925 from Meharry Medical College, a historically black college in Nashville, Tennessee. Stanton also earned his D.D.S. here, in 1929.

He married and had a family, including daughter Beverly Stanton. She married Dr. Dwight McKenna of New Orleans. In 1985, they founded The New Orleans Tribune, naming it after a historic 1864 newspaper published in French and English. In 2005 the McKennas founded Le Musee de f.p.c., "devoted to the story of the free people of color of New Orleans, as told by their descendants."

== Career ==
Upon graduating with his dental degree, Stanton joined the Great Migration of African Americans from the South to the North, moving to East Chicago, Indiana. There he began practicing dentistry. He also joined the Better Government Democratic Political Club, where he was a member from approximately 1929 to 1932. Stanton was integral to pioneering efforts to recruit African Americans to the Democratic Party in Lake County. He was among those who produced a realignment in state politics in 1932, when African Americans helped elect Democratic candidates to state and other offices.

Stanton's historic election as an African-American Democrat in 1932 to the state legislature was the product of many years of organizing in the local community and part of national, historic realignment. The Democratic Party in the county had few African Americans before his pioneering efforts. Also elected as a Democrat to the lower house in that year was Henry J. Richardson Jr., a young African-American lawyer from Indianapolis. Since the Civil War, African Americans had traditionally supported the Republican Party, which had gained their emancipation and franchise. Since the turn of the century, black Republicans in the South had mostly been excluded from voting by discriminatory laws passed by white Democrats.

By the 1930s, many African Americans had moved to cities, where they were being recruited to political action and voting by both Republicans and Democrats. In some places, they began to become active with local and state Democratic organizations, as they were disappointed at the Republican Party's failure to aid them before and during the Depression.

The 1932 election represented a historic breakthrough, because after shutting African Americans out of state politics entirely for many years, both parties had slated an African-American candidate for the Lake County seat. Stanton won.

Stanton served two terms in the Indiana House, winning reelection in 1934. Upon leaving the legislature, he moved to Indianapolis, the state capital, in 1937. In addition to his dental practice, he served in the Resettlement Administration office in the city from 1937 to 1938, during President Franklin D. Roosevelt's administration.

Stanton moved to Fort Wayne in 1941.

After more than 50 years in the profession, Stanton retired as a dentist in 1983. He and his family were members of the African Methodist Episcopal church, the first independent black denomination in the United States, founded in Philadelphia. He was also a member of Alpha Phi Alpha, the first intercollegiate black fraternity, and the National Dental Association.

His daughter, Beverly Stanton, married Dr. Dwight McKenna, whom she met while working in Washington, D.C., where he was completing his medical degree at Howard University. They settled in his hometown of New Orleans, where he set up his medical practice. In 1985, they founded The New Orleans Tribune, naming it after a historic landmark newspaper founded in 1864 by Dr. Louis Charles Roudanez, a physician and publisher, a free man of color there. It was the first daily black newspaper in the United States and was published in French and English. In 2005 the McKennas founded Le Musee de f.p.c., "devoted to the story of the free people of color of New Orleans, as told by their descendants.".

== See also ==
- List of African-American officeholders (1900–1959)
