= Paul Trévigne =

Paul Trévigne (1825 – September 1, 1908) was an American newspaperman and civil rights activist in New Orleans, Louisiana. He was editor of two black-owned newspapers, L'Union from 1862 until it closed in 1864, and then the New Orleans Tribune (1864-1870), the first black daily newspaper in the country. Both papers were bilingual, published in French and English.

He continued to work on civil rights issues, seeking equal rights for those who had been free people of color before the war, as well as the many freedmen emancipated by the war. He opposed efforts by white Democrats to impose segregation.

== Early life and education ==
Paul Trévigne was born in 1825, biracial son of a veteran of the 1815 Battle of New Orleans. Free men of color had served in the militia under French rule, and fought with the Americans during the United States' War of 1812 against the British. Tensions had arisen relatively soon after the US made the Louisiana Purchase of 1803. Trévigne grew up in the community of free people of color, who had had a range of liberties under French colonial rule. After the United States acquired this territory, white American settlers in Louisiana had begun to impose the binary segregation common to their slave societies.

There were no public schools in the city when Paul was young. Some free children of color were educated or tutored privately if their families could afford it. Trévigne became educated. Early in his career he taught at the Catholic Indigent Orphan School, established by the Archdiocese of New Orleans, which provided education to African-American orphans.

== Newspaper career ==
Dr. Louis Charles Roudanez and his older brother Jean Baptiste Roudanez, also free men of color, founded L'Union in 1862 after the Union defeated the Confederate troops and captured New Orleans in April of that year.

They hired Trévigne as editor of L'Union, which strongly promoted the Unionist Republican cause in Louisiana. It also promoted the cause of emancipation and the franchise for all enslaved African Americans in the state, where blacks made up half the population, and across the South. Trévigne emphasized the potential political power of blacks in the state and region. He and Dr. Roudanez encountered much opposition among white Democrats in the city.

After acquiring a printing press from New York in 1864, Dr. Roudanez founded La Tribune de la Nouvelle-Orleans (New Orleans Tribune) that same year. It also attracted readers from the Union Army. Trévigne again served as his editor. They stressed civil rights for all African Americans, not the relatively few who had been free people of color before the war. The paper closed in 1869 after losing national Republican Party funding because of criticism by some northern white opponents.

The New Orleans Tribune, published in French and English, was the first daily black newspaper in the United States. The two newspapers had wide circulation among black readers in the city and across the South. Readers were mostly free people of color, as enslaved African Americans were generally prohibited from being educated.

Also working at the newspapers was Jean-Charles Houzeau, a Francophone astronomer, journalist, and abolitionist from Belgium. He had immigrated to the United States after political troubles in what was then part of the Dutch Republic. He lived in Texas for a while before settling in New Orleans.

During the latter part of Reconstruction, Trévigne wrote Centennial History of the Louisiana Negro, which was published in the Louisianian in 1875-1876 to commemorate the 100th anniversary of the American Revolution. One of the first state histories about blacks to be published in the United States, it "highlighted the scientific, literary, and artistic contributions of African Americans in Louisiana".

He continued to oppose segregation, working for civil rights after the US Supreme Court decision in Plessy v. Ferguson (1896), which ruled that separate but equal accommodations were constitutional. The case had challenged state segregation restrictions on interstate railroads, as the Constitution provided for equal rights to all citizens.

== Legacy and honors ==
- Trévigne and Roundanez were portrayed in the 21st-century opera Les Lions de la Reconstruction (Lions of Reconstruction), which was premiered by OperaCréole at the Marigny Opera House on October 19–21, 2018. The role of Trévigne was sung by tenor Jonathan Parham, and that of Dr. Roudanez was sung by Metropolitan Opera baritone Richard Hobson.

== Personal life ==
Trévigne's aunt was Mother Henriette DeLille, the pioneering Black Catholic in New Orleans who founded the Sisters of the Holy Family.
