= Colored Citizen (Vicksburg) =

Defunct African American newspaper in Mississippi

The Colored Citizen was the first African American newspaper published in Mississippi. It was founded by Henry Mayson in 1867, and it probably died by 1868. According to Mayson, the paper sought racial equality and the elimination of racial discrimination, including in school funding schemes. No surviving copies of the paper have been located.

== Publication and demise ==
The Colored Citizen was founded in 1867 by Henry Mayson, a leader for the black community in and around the urban city of Vicksburg, Mississippi. It was the first African American newspaper in the state, (Note: The Natchez Circular was also an African American periodical in Mississippi, established and dissolved in 1865. Unlike the Colored Citizen, the Natchez Circular was not a bona fide newspaper, but instead a type of circular publication.) and it was commercially viable. Its intended publication date was May 11, 1867; Mayson published a prospectus in the Vicksburg Herald calling for equal educational opportunities for black and white children, the right for black men to hold public office, and the eradication of legally-enforced racial discrimination. A note attached to the prospectus in the Daily Clarion says it will be published "by an intelligent colored man" in opposition to black political "antagonism".

The precise contents of the Colored Citizen are unknown since no surviving copies have been located, but the paper likely contained four pages, held advertisements, sold annual subscriptions for between $1 and $2, (Note: Thompson 1993, p. 3, gives the annual subscription as between $1 and $2, but Mayson 1867, p. 2, gives it as "$3.50 per annum, payable in advance".) and may have been published weekly. It was Republican in political orientation. The paper likely died within a few months of its founding, though the precise dates of its dissolution are not known.

It was succeeded by the Citizen of Canton in 1869 and the Field Hand of Jackson around 1870. An unrelated paper also called the Colored Citizen was published in Jackson, founded in 1868. That paper was established by reverend James D. Lynch and politician James J. Spelman.

== Notes and references ==
=== Bibliography ===
- Garner, James Wilford (1901). Reconstruction in Mississippi. The Macmillan Company.
- Mayson, Henry (May 7, 1867). "Prospectus of the Vicksburg Colored Citizen". Vicksburg Herald. p. 2.
- McMillen, Neil R. (1990). Dark journey: Black Mississippians in the age of Jim Crow. University of Illinois Press. ISBN 9780252061561.
- Thompson, Julius Eric (1983). "Mississippi". In Suggs, Henry Lewis (ed.). The black press in the South, 1865–1979. Contributions in Afro-American and African Studies. Greenwood Press. ISBN 9780313222443.
- ——— (1993). The black press in Mississippi, 1865–1986. University Press of Florida. ISBN 9780813011745.
- ——— (2001). Black life in Mississippi: Essays on political, social, and cultural studies in a Deep South state. University Press of America. ISBN 9780761819226.
- "[Untitled]". Daily Clarion. May 9, 1867. p. 2.
