= Stephen James O'Meara =

American astronomer

- Born: 1956; Cambridge, Massachusetts, U.S.
- Citizenship: American
- Education: Northeastern University (B.S.)
- Scientific career
- Fields: Amateur astronomy
- Workplaces: Sky & Telescope; Astronomy

Stephen James O'Meara (born 1956) is an American amateur astronomer, science writer, and volcanologist. He was a former editor at Sky & Telescope and also wrote for Astronomy. O'Meara is known for several visual telescopic observations made before they were confirmed by spacecraft or professional instruments, including dark radial "spokes" in Saturn's B ring, the rotation period of Uranus, and the first visual sighting of Halley's Comet on its 1985 return. He is the author of the Deep-Sky Companions series of observing guides published by Cambridge University Press. The minor planet 3637 O'Meara is named in his honor.

== Early life and education ==
O'Meara was born in Cambridge, Massachusetts. He earned a Bachelor of Science degree from Northeastern University in Boston.

== Career ==
In 1976, using the 9-inch Clark refractor at Harvard, O'Meara reported seeing faint, dusky radial features crossing Saturn's B ring. His drawings showed the markings behaving like rigid structures that rotated with the ring system, which seemed incompatible with the known orbital mechanics of ring particles, and his reports were widely dismissed as optical illusions. However, the Voyager spacecraft, which flew past Saturn in 1980 and 1981, imaged Saturn's spokes directly, confirming the phenomenon. Similar features had been independently recorded in 1887 by Thomas Gwyn Elger in England and Charles-Émile Stuyvaert in Belgium.

About five years after his Saturn observations, O'Meara used the same modest-aperture refractor telescope to follow features in the temperate latitudes of Uranus and derive a rotation period for the planet. He the first person to determine Uranus's rotation period visually, a result obtained before the Voyager 2 flyby of the planet in 1986. As with the spokes, the observation was initially met with skepticism, in part to lingering distrust of visual planetary observers dating back to the controversy over the Martian canals.

In January 1985, while observing with a 24-inch telescope on Mauna Kea, O'Meara visually detected Halley's Comet at about magnitude 19.6, making him the first person to see the comet by eye on its 1985–86 return. He also co-authored Sky & Telescope guidance for observers viewing the comet from the southern United States and Mexico.

O'Meara spent much of his early career on the editorial staff of Sky & Telescope, joining the magazine in 1979 and becoming an associate editor in 1989. He subsequently moved to Astronomy magazine, where he wrote the long-running "Secret Sky" observing column and served as a contributing editor. He has also been an associate editor of GeminiFocus, the newsletter of the Gemini Observatory.

== Deep-sky object catalogues ==
O'Meara's Deep-Sky Companions series of observing guides for deep-sky objects has five volumes, which are The Messier Objects, The Caldwell Objects, Hidden Treasures, The Secret Deep, and Southern Gems. He also wrote a guide to the Herschel 400 list of deep-sky objects.

The books contain the following original astronomical catalogues:

- Hidden Treasures (HT) main list (109 objects)
- Hidden Treasures (AHT) additional list (20 objects) (some of which are duplicated in the The Secret Deep (SD) main list)
- The Secret Deep (SD) main list (109 objects)
- The Secret Deep (ASD) additional list (21 objects)
- Southern Gems (SG) (120 objects)
- Southern Gems (ASG) additional list (42 objects)

Many, but not all, of these objects overlap with Herschel 400 Catalogue objects. Herschel 400 objects all have NGC and IC designations, since the Herschel 400 Catalogue is a subset of John Herschel's General Catalogue of Nebulae and Clusters (1864). However, many objects in O'Meara's catalogues have no NGC and IC designations, since they were not catalogued by Herschel.

== Personal life ==
O'Meara later moved to Botswana with his wife Deborah Carter, who operates stargazing safaris. Since 2018, he has led Sky & Telescope's stargazing safaris in Botswana.

== Selected books ==
- O'Meara, Stephen James (1998). Deep-Sky Companions: The Messier Objects. Cambridge University Press.
- O'Meara, Stephen James (2002). Deep-Sky Companions: The Caldwell Objects. Cambridge University Press. ISBN 978-0-521-82796-6.
- O'Meara, Stephen James (2007). Deep-Sky Companions: Hidden Treasures. Cambridge University Press. ISBN 978-0-521-83704-0.
- O'Meara, Stephen James (2007). Herschel 400 Observing Guide. Cambridge University Press. ISBN 978-0-521-85893-9.
- O'Meara, Stephen James (2009). Are You Afraid Yet? The Science Behind Scary Stuff. Kids Can Press.
- O'Meara, Stephen James (2011). Deep-Sky Companions: The Secret Deep. Cambridge University Press. ISBN 978-0-521-19876-9.
- O'Meara, Stephen James (2013). Deep-Sky Companions: Southern Gems. Cambridge University Press. ISBN 978-1-107-01501-2.
- O'Meara, Stephen James (2014). Deep-Sky Companions: The Messier Objects (2nd ed.). Cambridge University Press. ISBN 978-1-107-01837-2.
- O'Meara, Stephen James (2020). Night Skies of Botswana: Includes Local Star Lore. Struik Nature. ISBN 978-1-77584-693-2.

== See also ==
- Herschel 400 Catalogue
- Patrick Moore, creator of the Caldwell catalogue
