= William Brown (Louisiana politician) =

American educator, editor, and state superintendent of education (1832–1883)

William G. Brown

Louisiana State Superintendent of Education
- In office 1872–1876
- Preceded by: Thomas W. Conway
- Succeeded by: Robert M. Lusher

Personal details
- Born: August 12, 1832 Trenton, New Jersey, US
- Died: May 14, 1883 (aged 50) New Orleans, Louisiana, US
- Occupation: Politician, educator, editor

William G. Brown (August 12, 1832 – May 14, 1883) was an American educator, editor, and the first African American to serve as Louisiana State Superintendent of Education from 1872 to 1876. Brown was one of only four African Americans elected to the office of state education superintendent in the United States during the Reconstruction era. He also served as the first editor of the Louisianian newspaper.

== Early life and career ==
Brown was born August 12, 1832, to Henry and Sarah Brown, an interracial couple, in Trenton, New Jersey. During Brown's childhood, the family moved to Jamaica, where his father worked as a journalist. Brown received his education in the British West Indies or in England and later lived in Washington, D.C. Following the American Civil War, he moved to New Orleans to become a teacher.

Brown held minor offices such as Iberville Parish delegate (alongside Pierre G. Deslonde) to the Louisiana Constitutional Convention of 1867–1868, election registrar for Iberville Parish, and chief enrolling clerk in the Louisiana State Senate. From 1870 to early 1873, he was the first editor of the Louisianian, a Radical Republican semi-weekly newspaper founded in New Orleans in 1870 by P. B. S. Pinchback, who sought to appeal to white as well as Black readers.

== Political career ==
Brown was a delegate representing New Orleans' 3rd Ward at the Republican state convention, held in August 1872 in New Orleans. The convention nominated Brown for state superintendent of public instruction on a Republican unity ticket headed by William P. Kellogg. The Republican ticket swept the bitterly contested 1872 state elections and assumed office on December 10, 1872.

As superintendent, Brown had to contend with Louisiana's severely underfunded public school districts. He strengthened fiscal accountability and efficiency, presided over the construction of 213 schoolhouses, fought for greater legislative funding, and upheld school desegregation. He continued to hold minor public offices, including assistant secretary to the New Orleans Park Board of Commissioners and trustee of New Orleans University, Louisiana State University, the University of Louisiana, and Louisiana State Agricultural and Mechanical College (which merged with LSU in 1877).

Brown was again nominated for superintendent in the 1876 elections, but the Republican ticket lost the bitterly contested election, signaling the return of government-sanctioned white supremacy in Louisiana. The Democrat-dominated state legislature empaneled a five-member committee to investigate the State Department of Education under previous Republican administrations. This Joint Committee of Investigation praised Brown for his "faithfully kept" records and “faithful performance of his duties.” Harper’s Weekly had deemed him "a colored man of unusual attainments, energy, and refinement."

== Private life ==
After leaving office in 1877, Brown became a partner in the brokerage firm of C. C. Antoine & Company in New Orleans. From 1880 through 1883, he worked as Liquidating Clerk in the United States Custom House (New Orleans). As of 1882, he was serving as corresponding secretary of the Crescent City Arthur Republican Central Club. In 1883, Brown became treasurer and Antoine president of the Cosmopolitan Insurance Association. A Freemason, Brown served as deputy grand master of the Eureka Grand Lodge of the State of Louisiana and as treasurer of Berry Lodge No. 2.

Brown married Catherine Murchison, a native of Louisiana, on October 22, 1872, in New Orleans.

He died at his New Orleans home on May 14, 1883, at the age of 50.

== See also ==
- Alexander Dimitry
