= Niesten =

Niesten may refer to:

- Niesten (crater), an impact crater on Mars
- Coen Niesten (1938–2024), Dutch racing cyclist
- Louis Niesten (1844–1920), Belgian astronomer
