= L'Union (American newspaper) =

Defunct African-American newspaper

- "A Political, Literary, and Progressive Journal" (motto)
- Inaugural Edition of L'Union on September 27, 1862
- Founder(s): Louis Charles Roudanez; Jean Baptiste Roudanez; Paul Trévigne
- Editor: Frank F. Barclay
- Founded: September 27, 1862
- Ceased publication: July 19, 1864
- Language: French; English
- City: New Orleans, Louisiana, United States
- Readership: Free people of color in the New Orleans area

L'Union was the first African-American newspaper in the Southern United States. (Note: Another source, the Library of Congress, states that the L'Union newspaper was the first documented French language African-American newspaper in the American South.) The newspaper was based in New Orleans, Louisiana, and was published from 1862 to 1864. Articles in L'Union were written in the French language, with the newspaper's primary readership being free people of color in the New Orleans area, especially in the faubourgs Marigny and Tremé.

== History ==
New Orleans was captured by Union forces early in the American Civil War because of the city's importance as a seaport at the time. In the immediate antebellum period in New Orleans, free people of color had experienced increasing racial oppression. Following the fall of New Orleans to Union forces early in the American Civil War, they felt they needed voice. For this reason, a group of prominent men of the middle-class African American creole community in New Orleans founded L'Union in 1862. These included brothers Louis Charles Roudanez and Jean Baptiste Roudanez, and also Paul Trévigne.

Initially, L'Union was published as a bi-weekly, two page, five column publication in the French language. It appeared on Wednesdays and Sundays. The newspaper was published for most of its existence from the New Orleans French Quarter at an office located at 21 Conti Street which was re-numbered much later as 527 Conti Street.

As it came into existence, L'Union was organized with a board of directors selected from the local Creole community and re-elected every six months. Board members included Oscar Dunn who later became the first African-American to be governor of a U.S. state, and Francis E. Dumas, who was an officer in the Union Army, among other board members.

L'Union reported on progress of the American Civil War and on the impact of slavery. It editorialized for the full enfranchisement of African-Americans as citizens of the United States. Its first edition stated: "We inaugurate today a new era in the history of the South" (English translation).

The newspaper often based its positions on basic principles of the Constitution of the United States or the Declaration of Independence. The inaugural edition of L'Union included a French translation of the United States Constitution.

Because of ongoing intimidation against the Creole publishers of L'Union, the publishers appointed Frank F. Barclay to the position of "Éditeur-Imprimeur" (English: "Publisher-Printer") for L'Union late in 1862. Barclay was a white journalist who had previously published other French language newspapers in New Orleans. However, the publishers continued to receive threats, especially because of their stance against the Confederate States of America during the time of the American Civil War. In particular, these included threats of violence against Paul Trévigne and threats to burn the building from which L'Union was published.

First page of the August 1, 1863, English language version of L'Union, containing an example of a literary piece with a political message

L'Union endured financial difficulties from the start, due to inadequate advertising revenue and the fact that its readership was limited by its publication in the French language. Ongoing threats of violence against the newspaper and its publishers compounded the financial problems. As a result, L'Union was sold to Louis Dutuit in the Fall of 1862. The new ownership expanded the scope of the newspaper, made it triweekly rather than bi-weekly, and increased advertising.

Starting in July 1863, L'Union was simultaneously published in English under the title Union. However, the English language version was not a replica of the French version but was abbreviated, with narrower scope and fewer advertisements. The English language version also was published less frequently than the French language version.

L'Union published literature, an example being poetry by Louisiana Creole author Adolphe Duhart. The literary pieces often had political messages and were consistent with the newspaper's motto "A Political, Literary, and Progressive Journal".

=== Liquidation ===
Despite its expanded scope, the financial difficulties of L'Union continued. These were due to a feeling among the local African-American community that the paper best served the Creole population rather than the larger African-American community, and so in that respect did not adequately serve the newspaper's reason for existence. Additionally, the Union Army discontinued its subsidies to the newspaper for publishing public notices.

Roudanez regained ownership of the newspaper, buying out the other owners of L'Union. He then launched publication of The New Orleans Tribune, using many of the same facilities as L'Union but published with broader readership, rendering it more effective in its objectives. Paul Trévigne remained affiliated with the new publication. The publication office initially remained at the Conti Street location of L'Union.

== See also ==
- New Orleans in the American Civil War
- List of African American newspapers in Louisiana
- Louisiana Creole people
- Freedom's Journal, the first African-American newspaper in the United States
- African American newspapers
- List of African American newspapers and media outlets
