= Charles-Émile Stuyvaert =

Belgian astronomer

Charles Émile Stuyvaert (21 May 1851 – 18 November 1908) was a Belgian astronomer. He was a contemporary of Albert Lancaster, Louis Niesten and Jean-Charles Houzeau.

== Life ==
He was born on 21 May 1851 in Schaerbeek, Brussels.

== Career ==
He is most famous for his trip to San Antonio, Texas in 1882 along with Jean-Charles Houzeau. Together they were able to observe the transit of Venus across the Sun for the first time in human history.
