= List of African American newspapers in Louisiana =

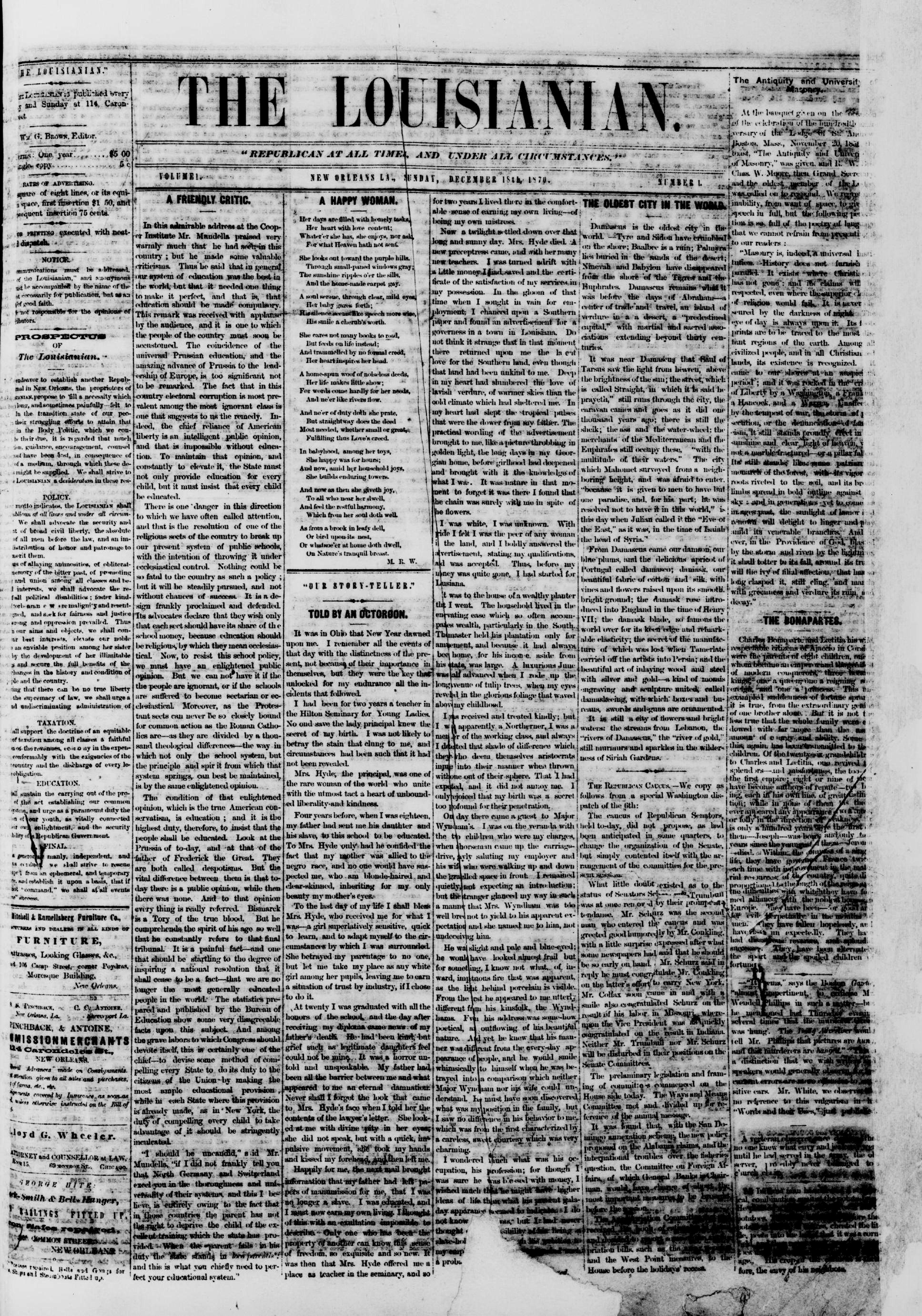
Inaugural issue of The Louisianian from December 1870.

This is a list of African American newspapers that have been published in Louisiana. It includes both current and historical newspapers.

The first African American newspaper in Louisiana was L'Union, a French-language newspaper launched in 1862. The first daily African American newspaper in Louisiana, and in the entire country, came two years later with La Tribune de la Nouvelle-Orléans.

Notably, although the Louisiana Creole people were not considered Black until after the Civil War, the history of African American newspapers in Louisiana is sometimes considered to begin with the New Orleans Daily Creole, a Creole pro-slavery newspaper launched in 1856. However, scholars of the African American press generally exclude the Daily Creole.

Although L'Union was the first African American newspaper in Louisiana, it was not the state's first African American periodical: starting in 1843 a successful African American literary magazine was published in New Orleans, titled L'Album Litteraire, Journal des Jeunes Gens.

Many African American newspapers are published in Louisiana today; they are highlighted in green in the list below. The oldest such newspaper still in publication is The Shreveport Sun, established in 1920.

== Newspapers ==
City	Title	Beginning	End	Frequency	Call numbers	Remarks
Alexandria	The Louisiana Baptist	1800s	?	Weekly	LCCN sn87091092; OCLC 16917664	Attested from at least 1901.
Alexandria	Alexandria News Leader; Alexandria News Weekly	1963	1999	Weekly	LCCN sn83026442, sn88064703; OCLC 18887798, 10253370	Edited by C.J. Bell.
Baton Rouge	The Capital City Weekly	1946	1900s	Weekly	LCCN sn89059343; OCLC 20366365	
Baton Rouge	The Baton Rouge Chronicle	1993?	?	Monthly	OCLC 30775670	Published by Leonard A. Black. Edited by H. Louis Author.
Baton Rouge	Baton Rouge Community Leader; Baton Rouge News Leader; Community Leader; News Leader; The Community Leader; Weekly Leader	1952	?	Weekly	LCCN sn84024002, sn84024003, sn88064154, sn88064192, sn89059304; OCLC 10265464, 10265470, 17502254, 20110062, 3393220	Attested through at least 1982.
Baton Rouge	Eagle Dispatch	1900s	?	Weekly	LCCN sn99063225; OCLC 41890961	Attested from at least 1930.
Baton Rouge	The Eagle Dispatch	1923?	?	Weekly		Edited by W.S. Boswell.
Baton Rouge	The Baton Rouge Examiner	1983	1984?	Monthly		Edited by Kermit Thomas.
Baton Rouge	The Grand Era	1870	1877	Weekly	LCCN sn85034234; OCLC 12597843	Edited by J. Henri Burch around 1875.
Baton Rouge	The Greater Baton Rouge Metro	1983	1986?	Weekly		Edited by Kermit R. Thomas (1984–1985) and by Lee T. Wesley (1985).
Baton Rouge	The Baton Rouge Herald	1960	1961	Weekly	LCCN sn89059382; OCLC 20384110	
Baton Rouge	The Observer	1899	1900	Weekly	LCCN 2014254009, sn83016560; OCLC 851187461, 9907976	
Baton Rouge	Baton Rouge Post	1937	?	Weekly	LCCN sn88064129; OCLC 17499960	
Baton Rouge	Baton Rouge Post	1983	2007	Irregular or weekly	LCCN sn88064185; OCLC 17554084	Not to be confused with current online newspaper of same title.
Baton Rouge	The Southern Digest	?	current	Weekly during Southern University fall, spring and summer semesters	LCCN sn2001061845; OCLC 48498507; ISSN 1540-7276	Official site
Baton Rouge	Weekly Press	1980s	current	Weekly	LCCN sn89059311, sn89059312; OCLC 20362228, 20362251	Official site
Grambling	Spectrum	1991?	?	Bimonthly newspaper	OCLC 28349778	Published by Ezil Bibbs Jr.
Lafayette	Lafayette News Leader	1970?	1900s	Weekly	LCCN sn84024001; OCLC 10265442, 17747589	Attested through at least 1973.
Lafayette	The Rising Seed	1989	1993	Monthly	OCLC 28390117	Published and edited by Takuna Maulanae Shabazz.
Lake Charles	Lake Charles News Leader	1966	1973	Weekly	LCCN sn84024009; OCLC 10265539, 2293239	
Monroe	The Monroe Broadcast; The Southern Broadcast	1932	?	Weekly	LCCN sn92060455, sn94086225; OCLC 27085729, 32324819	Attested through at least 1937.
Monroe	The Monroe Dispatch	1971 or 1975	current	Weekly	LCCN sn89059356; OCLC 20378041	Official site; Published by F.J. DeTeige. Edited by Irma Hall DeTeige.
Monroe	Black Free Press; Free Press; Rapping Black (1969–1973)	1969	current	Weekly	LCCN sn89059050, sn89059470; OCLC 19285563, 20795308; Rapping Black: LCCN sn89059469; OCLC 20795296	Official site; Founded by Roosevelt Wright, Jr., initially as a flyer to spread news about the local civil rights movement.
Monroe / Baton Rouge (1968–1973)	Monroe News Leader	1963?	?	Weekly	LCCN sn84024015; OCLC 10282654, 2465145	
New Orleans	The New Orleans Advocate	1866	1869	Weekly	LCCN sn86079014, sn97016095; OCLC 13022524, 37215426	
New Orleans	The Black PAC Epitaph	1970s	?		LCCN sn89059227; OCLC 19718168	Attested at least from 1972.
New Orleans	The Black Republican	1865	1865	Weekly	LCCN 2011254251, sn83016563; OCLC 264072, 607384769, 9908183	Published by the Black Republican Newspaper Association.
New Orleans	The Carrollton Advocate	1970	1970	Irregular	LCCN sn89059219; OCLC 19718158	
New Orleans	The Crusader	1889	1890s	Weekly	LCCN 2017225079, sn98062573; OCLC 1000055678, 2636838	
New Orleans	The Crusader	1889	1891 or 1898	Weekly	LCCN sn83016562; OCLC 9908127	
New Orleans	The Daily Crusader	1891	1896	Daily	LCCN sn89059185; OCLC 19643548	
New Orleans	The Daily Spokesman	1914	1900s	Daily	LCCN sn89059232; OCLC 19718182	
New Orleans	Black Data Newsweekly; Data; Data Newsweekly; New Orleans Data News Weekly	1967	current	Weekly or biweekly	LCCN sn89007183, sn89059281, sn89059282, sn89059283, sn89059284, sn8907183; OCLC 10903348, 19986548, 19986553, 6347836, 8107743; ISSN 1043-4445	Official site
New Orleans	Le Dimanche	1861	1876	Weekly	LCCN sn83016654; OCLC 9961481	Published by Theard and Trosclair.; In French.; Status as an African American newspaper contested due to its support of white supremacy.
New Orleans	The Free South	1868	?	Weekly	OCLC 14288863	Published by W.P. Allen.
New Orleans	The New Orleans Herald	1925	1925	Biweekly	LCCN sn89059061; OCLC 19320897	
New Orleans	The Hope for the Future	1969	?	Unknown	OCLC 28349986	
New Orleans	New Orleans Informer And Sentinel; New Orleans Informer and Sentinel	1940	?	Weekly	LCCN sn87091049; OCLC 16882170	Attested through at least 1944.
New Orleans	Inside New Orleans	1964	?	Weekly	LCCN 2012254027, sn89059111; OCLC 19533770, 664611250; ISSN 2642-6390, 2642-6404	
New Orleans	L'Union; Le Union: Journal Politique, Litteraire et Progressiste; The Union (1863–1864)	1862	1864	Triweekly	LCCN sn83026401, 2013254046; OCLC 811645304, 2789487, 2789618, 990651, 9990651	First African American newspaper in Louisiana.; In French until July 1863; then in French and English. The English edition differed greatly from the French, and did not include the literary material from the French edition.
New Orleans	The Louisiana Weekly	1925	current	Weekly	LCCN sn83045291, sn94080289; OCLC 10537986, 2263695, 32193331; ISSN 2641-0753	Official site
New Orleans	National Negro Voice	1924	?	Monthly newspaper	LCCN sn93059229; OCLC 27762656	Published by R.A. Flynn.; Attested through at least 1931.
New Orleans	The Negro Gazette	1872	1872	Weekly	LCCN sn93059225; OCLC 27743804	"Published every Saturday morning during the presidential campaign."
New Orleans	The Plain Truth Of New Orleans	1969	1970	Bimonthly newspaper	LCCN sn89059088; OCLC 7366271	
New Orleans	The Republican Courier	1899	1900	Weekly	LCCN sn83016564; OCLC 2806334, 9908251	
New Orleans	The Louisiana Republican	1881	1882	Weekly	LCCN sn89059142; OCLC 19537223	In English and French.
New Orleans	New Orleans Sentinel	1940	1940s	Weekly	LCCN sn93062832, sn94081613; OCLC 27322252, 32229781	
New Orleans	The Sepia Socialite	1937	1945	Weekly	LCCN sn89059245, sn94081612; OCLC 19750471, 32229657	
New Orleans	Southern Republican	1898	1907	Weekly	LCCN sn83016561; OCLC 2806297, 9908065	Edited by Joseph LeBlanc.
New Orleans	Southwestern Advocate	1873	1876	Biweekly	LCCN 2018203277, sn83026418, sn97016096; OCLC 10123906, 681748961, 9235621; ISSN 2638-9819, 2638-9827	Published for the Methodist Episcopal Church of Louisiana.
New Orleans	Southwestern Christian Advocate	1877	1929	Weekly	LCCN 2018203278, sn83026416, sn97016097; OCLC 10123905, 192107532, 9235542; ISSN 2639-0124, 2639-0132	
New Orleans	The Spectator	1982	1983	Weekly	LCCN sn89059290; OCLC 19997185	
New Orleans	La Tribune de la Nouvelle-Orléans; New Orleans Tribune	1864	1870?	Daily from 1864 to 1869	LCCN sn83016710, 2013254341; OCLC 664617546, 13547679, 18544769, 2772145, 9998448	First African American daily newspaper in the United States.; In English and French.
New Orleans	The Louisianian (1870–1871); Semi-weekly Louisianian (1871–1872); The Weekly Louisianian	1870	1882	Weekly or twice weekly	LCCN sn83016630, sn83016631, sn83016632, 2013218552, 2013254350; OCLC 664618036, 827279530, 10790970, 2774211, 9957021, 9957091, 9957300; ISSN 2378-0398, 2326-6317, 2326-6287, 2326-6309, 2378-038X	Free online archive: Semi-weekly Louisianian, The Weekly Louisianian, The Louisianian
New Orleans	The Weekly Pelican	1886	1889	Weekly	LCCN 2013254359, sn83016655; OCLC 2775197, 849430601, 9961600	Edited by John L. Minor.
Plaquemine	The Fraternal Herald	1930	?	Weekly		Published by Tabernacle Herald Publishing House.
Plaquemine	New Orleans Broadcast - Fraternal Herald	1934	?	Weekly		
Ponchatoula	The Drum	1980s	current	Weekly	LCCN sn90056024; OCLC 21188856; ISSN 1937-2019	Official site; Free online archive
Scotlandville	Baton Rouge Scotland Press	1970s	1980s	Weekly	LCCN sn91099503; OCLC 23960369	
Shreveport	Shreveport Afro-American	1920s	?	Weekly	LCCN sn88064501; OCLC 18122587	Attested through at least 1932.
Shreveport	Councilor	1962	1981	Monthly newspaper	LCCN sn78001655; OCLC 1644635; ISSN 0010-9991	
Shreveport	The Shreveport Sun; The Shreveport Sun And Bis News (1964–1966)	1920	current	Weekly	LCCN sn89059440, sn83045388, sn89059439; OCLC 20606941, 9447422, 20606995, 8660431	Official site; Founded by Melvin Lee Collins, Sr.
St. Martinville	The Echo; L'écho	1872	1878	Weekly	ISSN 2641-8142; LCCN sn83027096, 2011254362; OCLC 747984637, 10028714	Published by J.F. Penne.; "Official journal of the Parish of St. Martin."; In English and French.
Thibodaux	The Lafourche Monitor	1905?	?	Twice monthly		Published by Knights and Ladies of Honor of America. Edited by C.H. Ballard.; Attested through at least 1936.
Vidalia	The Concordia Eagle	1873	1890	Weekly	LCCN 2011254357, sn83016716; OCLC 10024403, 2636996, 747741841; ISSN 2163-7040	Free online archive; Published by David Young.

== See also ==
- List of African American newspapers and media outlets
- List of African American newspapers in Arkansas
- List of African American newspapers in Mississippi
- List of African American newspapers in Texas
- List of newspapers in Louisiana

== Works cited ==
- Danky, James Philip; Hady, Maureen E., eds. (1998). African-American newspapers and periodicals : a national bibliography. Harvard University Press. ISBN 9780674007888.
- Davis, Thomas J. (1983). "Louisiana". In Suggs, Henry Lewis (ed.). The Black Press in the South, 1865–1979. ISBN 9780313222443.
- Pride, Armistead Scott; Wilson, Clint C. (1997). A History of the Black Press. Howard University Press. ISBN 9780882581927.
- Smith, Jessie Carney (2012). Black Firsts: 4,000 Ground-Breaking and Pioneering Historical Events. Visible Ink Press. ISBN 9781578593699.
