= Henry Mason =

Henry Mason may refer to:

- Henry Mason (priest) (1573–1647), English priest and theological writer
- Henry Mason (cricketer) (1840–1902), English cricketer and police officer
- Henry Mason (piano manufacturer) (1831–1890), American piano manufacturer
- Henry F. Mason (1860–1927), Kansas politician and judge
- Henry Joseph Monck Mason (1778–1858), Irish writer
- Henry Mason, alternative spelling used for state legislator and newspaperman Henry Mayson of Mississippi
- Rex Mason (Henry Greathead Rex Mason, 1885–1975), New Zealand politician
- Hank Mason (1931–2020), baseball player
- Henry Mason (EastEnders), a fictional character

== See also ==
- Henry Mayson (born c. 1835), Mississippi politician
- Harry Mason (disambiguation)
- Hal Mason (disambiguation)
