= Abraham Lincoln School =

Freedmen school in New Orleans

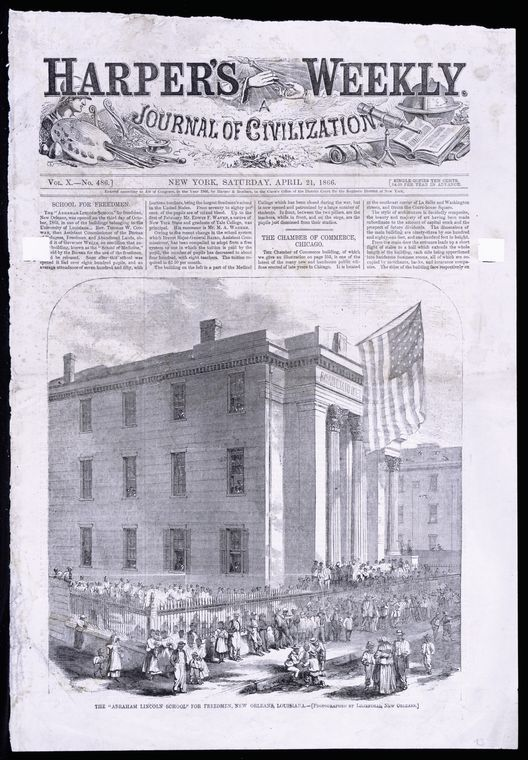

Abraham Lincoln School was for freedmen and opened on October 3, 1865, in New Orleans on the campus of University of Louisiana (predecessor to Tulane University) after the American Civil War. It was featured on the cover of Harper's Weekly.

It opened under the supervision of Rev. Thomas W. Conway, an assistant commissioner of the Freedmen Bureau. Attendance was free at first and attracted some 750 students. At that time, the school had 14 teachers. When tuition charges were instituted, enrollment dropped by about half. About 75 percent of students were reported to be of "mixed blood". Mr. E.F. Waven, a Yale graduate from New York was the school's first principal. He was succeeded by M.A. Warren.
