= Harold Mason =

Harold Mason may refer to:

- Harold Mason (politician) (1890–1949), Australian politician
- Harold Andrew Mason (1911–1993), English academic and editor
- Harold Mason, founder of Greenwood Publishing Group
- Harold L. Mason of the Mason family

== See also ==
- Hal Mason (disambiguation)
- Harry Mason (disambiguation)
- Brian Harold Mason (1917–2009), New Zealand geochemist and mineralogist
