= Hal Mason =

Hal Mason may refer to:

- Hal Mason, character in Falling Skies
- Hal Mason, character in Sensation Comics
- Hal Mason, character in Sons and Daughters (Australian TV series)

== See also ==
- Henry Mason (disambiguation)
- Harold Mason (disambiguation)
- Harry Mason (disambiguation)
