= Robert Mills Lusher =

American politician (1923–1890)

Louisiana Superintendent of Public Education
- In office 1865–1868
- Preceded by: John McNair
- Succeeded by: Thomas W. Conway

Louisiana Superintendent of Public Education
- In office 1877–1880
- Preceded by: William G. Brown
- Succeeded by: Edwin H. Fay

Personal details
- Born: May 17, 1823 Charlestown, South Carolina
- Died: November 23, 1890 (aged 67) New Orleans, Louisiana, US
- Spouse(s): Augusta Salomon (m. 1851–1872) Alice Lamberton (m. 1881–1890)
- Education: Georgetown University; Tulane University
- Profession: Lawyer, Educator
- Known for: Segregationist; Louisiana Education

Robert Mills Lusher (May 17, 1823 - November 23, 1890) was a writer, journalist, educator, and superintendent of education in Louisiana. He was known for segregating schools in Louisiana immediately following the American Civil War. Lusher moved to New Orleans following his first cousin Mary Powell Mills who was involved in an interracial marriage to Creole author and diplomat Alexander Dimitry. Alexander was the first superintendent of education in Louisiana and the first person of color to hold that position. The Dimitry family underwent countless instances of racism. Two major incidents involving the family were documented in court entitled Forstall, f.p.c. v. Dimitry (1833) and Pandelly v. Wiltz (1854). The Creole family was heavily pressured to pass as white which is deemed ethnocide. Lusher was closely involved with the Dimitry family and endorsed by Alexander and Alexander's daughter Virginia Ruth Dimitry was also involved with Lusher as an educator.

Robert was born in Charlestown, South Carolina from a young age he was educated by prominent architect Robert Mills. While in Washington he attended Georgetown College and met Creole author and educator Alexander Dimitry whom motivated the young man to move to New Orleans, Louisiana. While in Louisiana he finished a law degree at Tulane University. He was a court clerk for many years, served as a clerk of the Confederate states district court, and chief tax collector for Louisiana. He became the ninth state superintendent of education in Louisiana supporting segregation of schools right after the Civil War and the onset of Jim Crow laws.

Lusher was a member of the Independent Order of the Odd Fellows. In 1847, he was elected and served two years as state Grand Worthy Patriarch of the Sons of Temperance. Lusher was honored with several medals throughout his life including three medals from Georgetown College around 1840, the Robert E. Lee Memorial medal in 1871, and a George Peabody Medal in 1880. His father's family home known as the George Lusher House is a tourist attraction in Charleston, South Carolina. In 2022, due to the growing pressure of the community, Lusher's name was removed from the Robert M. Lusher School on Willow Street in New Orleans because he was known as a segregationist.

== History ==
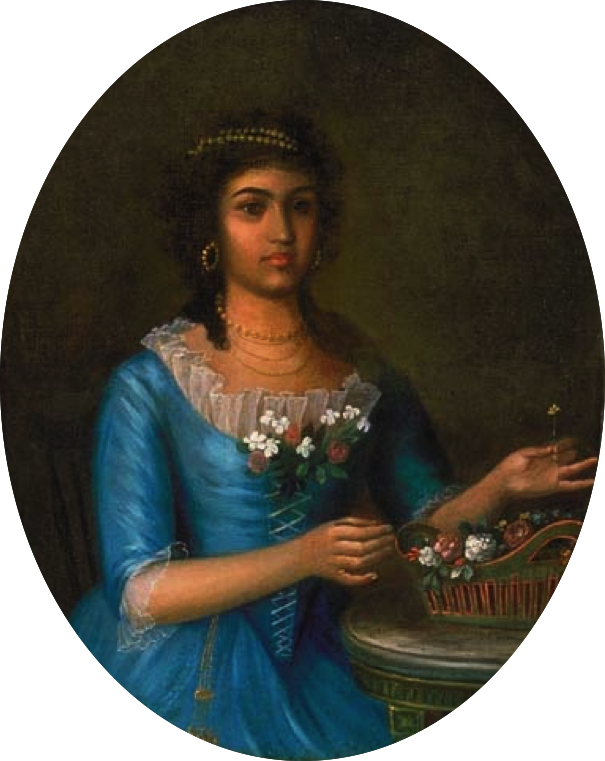
Lusher's first cousin's mother-in-law Marianne Celeste Dragon

Robert was born in Charlestown, South Carolina in 1823. Robert's father George Lusher was born in Bermuda and was a captain in the U.S. merchant marine. He married Sarah Mills (1787–1847) in 1805. George was an abusive drunkard and died around the time of Robert's birth. Robert was raised by his mother's brother prominent architect Robert Mills and other members of the Mills family. On April 5, 1835, his first cousin Mary Powell Mills married a prominent Creole educator named Alexander Dimitry. Robert was eleven years old at the time and it was an interracial marriage. By the 1840s, Lusher was influenced by the Dimitry family and attended Georgetown University. Alexander was the first person of color to attend the institution and by the 1860s at least 6 members of the Creole family went to Georgetown. After he graduated from Georgetown Lusher moved to New Orleans following the Dimitry family and his first cousin Mary. Alexander established the college of Saint Charles Parish. He was dean of the college and Robert taught at the school for four years along with Alexander. By 1847, the Governor of Louisiana Isaac Johnson appointed Alexander state superintendent of public education. He was the first person of color and the first incumbent of the office in Louisiana.

One year later in 1848, Lusher became deputy clerk of the United States District and Admiralty Court under Judge Theodore McCaleu holding the position for thirteen years. He also served as United States commissioner and the interpreter of the court. Lusher was the editor of the Louisiana Courier during the Taylor Case contest in 1848 and two years later in 1850, he graduated from the Law School of the University of Louisiana now known as Tulane University. By 1853, the Dimitry family was under attack due to their race and desire to hold political positions. Alexander was constantly persecuted throughout his life due to his ethnic background.

Alexander's first cousin George Pandely was ejected from public office as assistant alderman in New Orleans because he was of African descent. A detailed account of the Dimitry family's ethnic background was published in local newspapers proving their African heritage. It was against the law for people of African descent to hold office and own property. Alexander's school in Raymond, Mississippi dropped from 50 students to 2 students at the onset of the Wiltz allegations. It became known that the family was African but they publicly denounced their ethnicity in court in favor of a fictional American Indian heritage. The incident widely became known as the Pandelly Affair

By 1854, Lusher was elected by the City Council Director of the Public Schools of the Second Municipal District holding the position until the commencement of the Civil War. He was also deputy clerk of the United States District until 1861. Some members of the Dimitry Family such as George Pandelly became a court clerk in 1854 and Ernest Lagarde briefly served as a court clerk in 1859. By the American Civil War, Alexander and the entire family served the Confederate cause. Lusher took on the role of clerk of the Confederate states district court and chief tax collector for Louisiana while Alexander was assistant postmaster general of the Confederacy. At the close of the war, Lusher returned to New Orleans and associated himself with Professor William O. Rogers. They opened a school which Lusher conducted until November 1865.

Lusher was elected State Superintendent of Public Education following in the footsteps of Alexander, during his tenure from 1865 to 1868 he segregated schools in Louisiana due to the growing pressure from whites. By 1867-1868 his friend William O. Rogers was the superintendent of schools in New Orleans and his first cousin's husband Creole educator Alexander served as assistant superintendent that same period. Lusher left office in 1868 because he would have to administer racially mixed schools. Louisiana rejoined the Union on July 9, 1868, and the Opelousas massacre occurred two months later. Lusher took on the role of agent for the Louisiana Peabody Fund. He was elected superintendent in 1872 on the democratic ticket but was removed from office by P. B. S. Pinchback because of his segregationist history even though his public stance was racial integration. William Brown was selected instead he was the second African American to hold the position of Louisiana superintendent after Alexander.

One year later Alexander was one of the vice-presidents during the Grand Unification Mass Meeting in 1873 to desegregate schools in Louisiana during the Jim Crow era. The movement was met with strong opposition and hostility in the South. Lusher also maintained a school in New Orleans during the 1870s named the Commercial and Classical Academy also known as Lusher's Academy. He was sometimes the principal of the school. Lusher was re-elected to the office of superintendent in 1877 the same year as the Compromise of 1877 and remained in that position from 1877 to 1880. Regrettably, after Brown's departure, the people voted to resegregate schools in Louisiana, and William O. Rogers returned as superintendent of New Orleans schools, whilst Lusher played a pivotal role in enforcing segregation. William O. Rogers and Lusher established the Louisiana Journal of Education. Lusher was honored with several medals throughout his life, including three medals from Georgetown College around 1840, the Robert E. Lee Memorial medal in 1871, and a George Peabody medal in 1880. Regardless of his first cousin's interracial marriage and his affiliation with the Dimitry Family some of his literature featured white supremacist overtones, that coupled with his segregationist history forced the removal of his name from a school in New Orleans entitled the Robert M. Lusher School which was dedicated in 1913.

== Literary work ==
Books and Articles authored by Robert Mills Lusher
Date	Title
1879	The Duty Louisiana Owes to the Colored Race

== Bibliography ==
- Pecquet du Bellet, Louise (1907a). Some Prominent Virginia Families. Vol. 4. Lynchburg, VA: J. P. Bell Company (Incorporated).
- Arroyo, Oscar (May 1886). Biennial Report of the Secretary of State of the State of Louisiana to His Excellency S.D. McEnery Governor of Louisiana. Baton Rouge, LA: Printed by Leon Jasremski State Printer.
- Foretia, Crystal (April 5, 2023). The Color of Intimacy: Marriage, Passing, and the Legal Strategies of Afro-Creole Women in Antebellum New Orleans (PDF) (Thesis). New York, New York: Columbia University Department of History. Archived (PDF) from the original on July 9, 2023.
- Christophe, Landry (August 18, 2018). "Mixed Marriages In Louisiana Creole Families 164 marriages" (PDF). Louisiana Historic & Cultural Vistas. Archived (PDF) from the original on February 9, 2023.
- Broyard, Bliss (2007). One Drop My Father's Hidden Life A Story of Race and Family Secrets. New York, New York: Little Brown and Company. ISBN 9780316019736.
- Maddox, Joseph H. (August 4, 1853a). "Evidence of Lineage The Pandelly Affair". New Orleans Daily Crescent, Volume 6, No. 129. New Orleans, Louisiana: New Orleans Daily Crescent. p. 3, col. 2. Archived (PDF) from the original on August 25, 2023. "The Pandelly Affair"
- Thompson, Shirley Elizabeth (2009). Exiles at Home The Struggle to Become American in Creole New Orleans. Cambridge, MA: Harvard University Press. ISBN 9780674023512.
- Breaux, Peter Jarrod (2006). "William G. Brown and the Development of Education: A Retrospective on the Career of a State Superintendent of Public Education of African Descent in Louisiana". Tallahassee, FL: Louisiana State University. Archived from the original on March 18, 2020.
- Rogers, William O. (1868). Annual Report of the Board of Directors of Public Schools, City of New Orleans. New Orleans, LA: Stetson & Armstrong, Stationers and Printers.
- Reeves, William Dale (1999). Paths to Distinction Dr. James White, Governor E.D. White, and Chief Justice Edward Douglass White of Louisiana. Lafayette, LA: University of Louisiana at Lafayette. ISBN 9781887366335.
- Bryan, John M. (2001). Robert Mills America's First Architect. New York, NY: Princeton Architectural Press. ISBN 9781568982960.
- Kiddle, Henry; Schem, Alexander Jacob, eds. (1879). The Year-book of Education for 1878. New York, NY: E. Steiger.
- Maxwell, W.J. (1916). General Register of Georgetown University. Washington, D.C.: Georgetown University Press.
