= Henry J. Richardson Jr. =

American civil rights lawyer and activist (1902–1983)

Indiana House of Representatives
- In office 1932–1936

Personal details
- Born: Henry Johnson Richardson Jr. June 21, 1902 Huntsville, Alabama, US
- Died: December 5, 1983 (aged 81) Indianapolis, Indiana, US
- Resting place: Crown Hill Cemetery and Arboretum, Section 46, Lot 66; 39.8207951°N 86.1710665°W
- Party: Democratic Party
- Children: 2
- Education: Indiana Law School; University of Illinois
- Occupation: Civil rights lawyer and activist

Henry Johnson Richardson Jr. (June 21, 1902 – December 5, 1983) was a civil rights lawyer and activist, a member of the Indiana House of Representatives (1932–36), and a judge in Marion County, Indiana. He helped secure passage of Indiana's school desegregation law in 1949 and for organizing the Indianapolis Urban League in 1965. In 1932, he was one of the first two African Americans elected on the Democratic Party ticket to the state house, Richardson was also a leader in gaining passage of state laws that integrated the Indiana National Guard, ended racial discrimination in public accommodations and in Indiana University's student housing, and secured a fair employment practices law for public-works projects. In addition, Richardson won a landmark public housing discrimination case in 1953.

Richardson, an outspoken critic of racial prejudice and discrimination, was an active leader in numerous civic organizations, including the National Urban League, the National Association for the Advancement of Colored People, the United Negro College Fund, the Indianapolis Urban League, the Indiana Board of Public Welfare, the local Federation of Associated Clubs, the Greater Indianapolis Progress Committee, and the Indianapolis Church Federation, among others.

== Early life and education ==
Henry Johnson Richardson Jr. was born on June 21, 1902, in Huntsville, Alabama, to Henry J. and Louise M. (Johnson) Richardson. His father was a veteran of the Spanish–American War and worked as an insurance agent. His mother worked at home. When Richardson was seventeen years old his parents sent him to Indianapolis, Indiana, in search of better educational opportunities. While attending Shortridge High School, Richardson lived at Indianapolis's Senate Avenue Young Men's Christian Association and waited tables to support himself. He graduated from Shortridge in 1921 and attended the University of Illinois on scholarship for two years. At Illinois he served as editor of a student newspaper, The College Dreamer. Richardson briefly returned to Huntsville due to his mother's death.

He moved to Indianapolis in 1925 and earned a bachelor of laws degree (L.L.B.) in 1928 from the Indiana Law School. (Indiana Law School later became a part of Indiana University School of Law.)

== Marriage and family ==
Richardson married Roselyn Vivian Comer on September 18, 1938. Comer, a native of Georgia, was a graduate of Fort Valley Normal and Industrial School, attended Clark College in Atlanta, Georgia, from 1930 to 1934, and received a certificate from the Atlanta University School of Social Work in 1936. Prior to her marriage she worked for the American Friends Service Committee. Henry and Roselyn Richardson had two sons together, Henry J. III and Rodney C. Richardson. Roselyn Richardson was active in Indianapolis civic and community affairs, especially efforts to desegregate Indianapolis Public Schools.

== Lawyer and politician ==
=== 1930s ===
After completing law school in 1928, Richardson became interested in local and state politics. He joined the Democratic Party, which was seeking support from African Americans in what resulted as a historic realignment at the national and state levels. He was appointed as temporary judge in Marion County Superior Court in 1930.

Richardson was one of two African Americans elected to the Indiana House of Representatives on the Democratic Party ticket in 1932. Richardson and Robert Stanton (representing Gary and Lake County) were also the first African Americans in the twentieth century to be elected to the Indiana General Assembly. Richardson served two terms, winning reelection in 1934.

While serving as a state representative, Richardson sponsored legislation in 1935 to amend the state constitution to allow the integration of the Indiana National Guard. He also helped end discrimination in Indiana University's dormitories. (IU previously prohibited African American students from living in campus housing.) In 1934 Richardson and six other legislators were co-sponsors of a bill that was passed to end racial discrimination in public accommodations.

Richardson also sponsored a fair employment practices law that prohibited state or municipal corporations from discriminating in their contracts for public works projects. However, his two attempts to pass legislation to strengthen the state's 1885 Civil Rights Law were unsuccessful. Richardson's legislative actions earned him a reputation of a "political maverick", and the Democratic Party did not nominate him for a seat in the state legislature in 1936.

From 1933 to 1934 Richardson was an attorney for Home Owners' Loan Corporation in Indiana, as well as continuing as a civil rights activist. From 1932 to 1938 he was director of the Civil Liberties Division of the National Bar Association, established by black lawyers because they were excluded from the American Bar Association. In 1938 Richardson was one of the founders of the Federation of Associated Clubs, a local group of African-American organizations that worked on civil rights reform. In 1942 the federation became involved in ending segregation in Indianapolis theaters.

=== 1940s ===
During the 1940s Richardson continued to support civil rights reform. He was appointed to the Indiana Board of Public Welfare in 1940 and served on the board for four years. In 1947 Richardson chaired a committee that drafted, sponsored, and lobbied to secure passage of Indiana's "Anti-Hate" Law to eliminate racial segregation in the state. That same year he also secured a court injunction that barred Dixiecrat Party candidates, including Strom Thurmond, from the Indiana ballot. In 1948 Richardson was appointed a special judge for Marion County Criminal Court.

The longtime civil rights lawyer is best known for his efforts in 1949 to secure passage of Indiana's school desegregation law. Richardson played a major role in the effort as a lobbyist and policy strategist. Indiana's governor signed the Hunter-Binder bill (House Bill 242) into law in March 1949. (This preceded the US Supreme Court ruling in Brown v. Board of Education (1954) that segregation in public schools was unconstitutional.)

The Indiana law mandated integration of the state's public schools by 1954 and prohibited discriminatory hiring practices. School districts that did not comply with the new law would face suspension of public funding. Despite passage of the legislation, some of Indiana's school districts, including those in Indianapolis, Evansville, and Gary, were slow to integrate their schools. Activists filed subsequent legal actions to try to achieve this goal. In Indianapolis the legal challenges to the state law continued for more than two decades.

Richardson was also considered for government positions outside Indiana. In 1939 he was nominated for federal judge and in 1949 as governor of U.S. Virgin Islands, but was not confirmed for either post.

=== 1950s and 1960s ===
Richardson continued to work on civil rights issues, serving as an organization leader and for some groups as a legal representative. In 1953, as the legal representative for the state's chapter of the NAACP's (a position he had held since 1935), Richardson worked with Thurgood Marshall and Constance Baker Motley of the national office to win Jessie Woodbridge, et al. v. Housing Authority of Evansville, Indiana, a landmark public housing discrimination case. In 1958 Richardson became Indiana's first life member of the NAACP.

From 1963 to 1967 Richardson served as a member of the Indiana State Real Estate Commission and from 1964 to 1968 as a member of the Federal Civil Rights Commission. He also helped found the Indianapolis Urban League in 1965 and later served for several years as the group's president. He also served on the board of the National Urban League from 1966 to 1970.

=== Other community service ===
In addition to his leadership and civil rights activism in the Urban League, NAACP, and Federation of Associated Clubs, Richardson was involved in numerous other civic, religious, and community service organizations in Indiana. He was active in the Witherspoon Presbyterian Church, a board member of the Indianapolis Church Federation, the Indiana Board of Public Welfare, and the Indiana State Real Estate Commission, and a supporter of Indianapolis's Senate Ave YMCA. He was also active in the United Negro College Fund, including service as local chairman and as a member of the national board.

In the final two decades of his life, Richardson was a member of the Mayor's Advisory Council and Greater Indianapolis Progress Committee. During the 1970s Richardson was among Indianapolis's African-American community leaders who adamantly opposed UniGov, a plan to consolidate some municipal and county government departments. The UniGov bill passed the Indiana General Assembly and was implemented in Indianapolis and in Marion County.

== Death and legacy ==
Richardson died in Indianapolis on December 5, 1983. He is buried in Crown Hill Cemetery in Indianapolis.

Richardson, a longtime civil rights lawyer and activist in Indianapolis, is best known for his efforts in 1949 to secure passage of Indiana's school desegregation law, as well as being an outspoken critic of racial prejudice and discrimination. He led efforts to gain passage of state laws that integrated the Indiana National Guard, ended racial discrimination in public accommodations and in Indiana University's student housing, and secured a fair employment practices law for public works projects. Richardson also used the state's judicial system to bar Dixiecrat Party candidates from the Indiana ballot in the 1940s and won a landmark legal case against public housing discrimination in 1953.

Richardson was an active leader in numerous civic organization that included the National Urban League, the NAACP, the United Negro College Fund, and state and local groups such as the Indianapolis Urban League, the Indiana Board of Public Welfare, Indiana State Real Estate Commission, the local Federation of Associated Clubs, the Greater Indianapolis Progress Committee, the Mayor's Advisory Council, and the Indianapolis Church Federation.

== Honors and awards ==
Richardson received numerous awards, most notably, a Sagamore of the Wabash and in 1978 an honorary Doctor of Law degree from Indiana Central University (the present-day University of Indianapolis).
