= Thomas W. Conway =

- Born: Thomas W. Conway; March 13, 1840; Ireland
- Died: April 6, 1887 (aged 47); Brooklyn, New York, U.S.
- Occupations: Pastor, U.S. Civil War Chaplain (U.S.A.), Assistant Commissioner of the Freedman's Bureau in Alabama and Louisiana

Reverend Thomas W. Conway (March 3, 1840 – April 6, 1887) was assistant commissioner of the Freedmen Bureau in Alabama and Louisiana during the Reconstruction era that followed the American Civil War. Freedmen's Bureau activities in Louisiana began on June 13, 1865 when the Bureau's commissioner, Oliver O. Howard, appointed Chaplain Thomas W. Conway as the state's assistant commissioner. He published a report for that year, The Freedmen of Louisiana: Final Report of the Bureau of Free Labor, Department of the Gulf, to Major General Canby, Commanding (1865). Another seven assistant commissioners would later hold this office.

== Background ==
Conway served as superintendent of freedmen in the Union Army's Department of the Gulf. In that role he tried to organize work which the Army needed done. In April 1865, he was given command of the Freedmen Bureau's Alabama operations as interim Freedmen's Bureau assistant commissioner for the state. Amid the disruption of the closing days of the war, Conway reported on the horrible conditions African Americans faced in the South. Often having left plantations when emancipated, they faced a lack of housing and food, and brutal attacks by angry whites. He appealed for funding from the North.

In May 1865 Conway adopted a set of labor regulations he had drafted for Louisiana while under the authority of Major General Stephen Hurlbut. It was an attempt to set up rules for the new free labor market.

In 1866 Conway wrote to the Chamber of Commerce of the state of New York seeking support for a trip to England. He planned to seek capital investments for cotton cultivation projects which he said would benefit White and Black residents of Louisiana and help calm social tensions. He issued a series of orders regarding abandoned lands, sick refugees and freedmen, as well as other issues under the Freedmen Bureau's purview. Conway supervised the opening of the Abraham Lincoln School on the campus of the University of Louisiana (predecessor to Tulane University), a school for African Americans.

After passage of the Reconstruction Acts of 1867, Conway was no longer assigned to the Freedmen Bureau, but he remained in contact with Howard. He had introductory letters from Hulbert for a tour of Bureau activities in the South. He reported on assistance that the Bureau and its officials were providing to the Union League.

Conway was involved in Republican Party organizing in Louisiana during the Reconstruction era. In the contentious state elections for 1868, he supported Henry C. Warmoth for governor, who was a white Northerner considered a "carpetbagger" by some Republicans in the state. Conway criticized Dr. Louis Charles Roudanez of New Orleans, who published The New Orleans Tribune. Roudanez was part of the community of men who had been free people of color before the war, and he had been educated in Paris and at top American schools for his medical degree. The Tribune was the first daily black newspaper in the United States; it strongly supported the Republican Party and promoted the franchise for all African Americans. Roudanez supported local candidates over those from the North.

Conway lobbied in Washington, D.C., with the national party to switch from Roudanez's paper to the Republican, which supported Warmoth, as the party's official journal.
