= Harry Mason =

Harry Mason may refer to:

- Harry C. Mason (1867–1901), American politician from Ohio
- Harry H. Mason (1873–1946), U.S. Representative from Illinois
- Harry Mason (boxer) (1903–1977), British lightweight/welterweight boxer
- Harry Mason (American football), early professional football player for the Syracuse Athletic Club and the Watertown Red & Black
- Harry Mason (Coronation Street), a character from the soap opera Coronation Street
- Harry Mason (Silent Hill), a playable character from the video game Silent Hill

== See also ==
- Henry Mason (disambiguation)
- Hal Mason (disambiguation)
- Harold Mason (disambiguation)
