= Louisianian (newspaper) =

Newspaper published in New Orleans, US

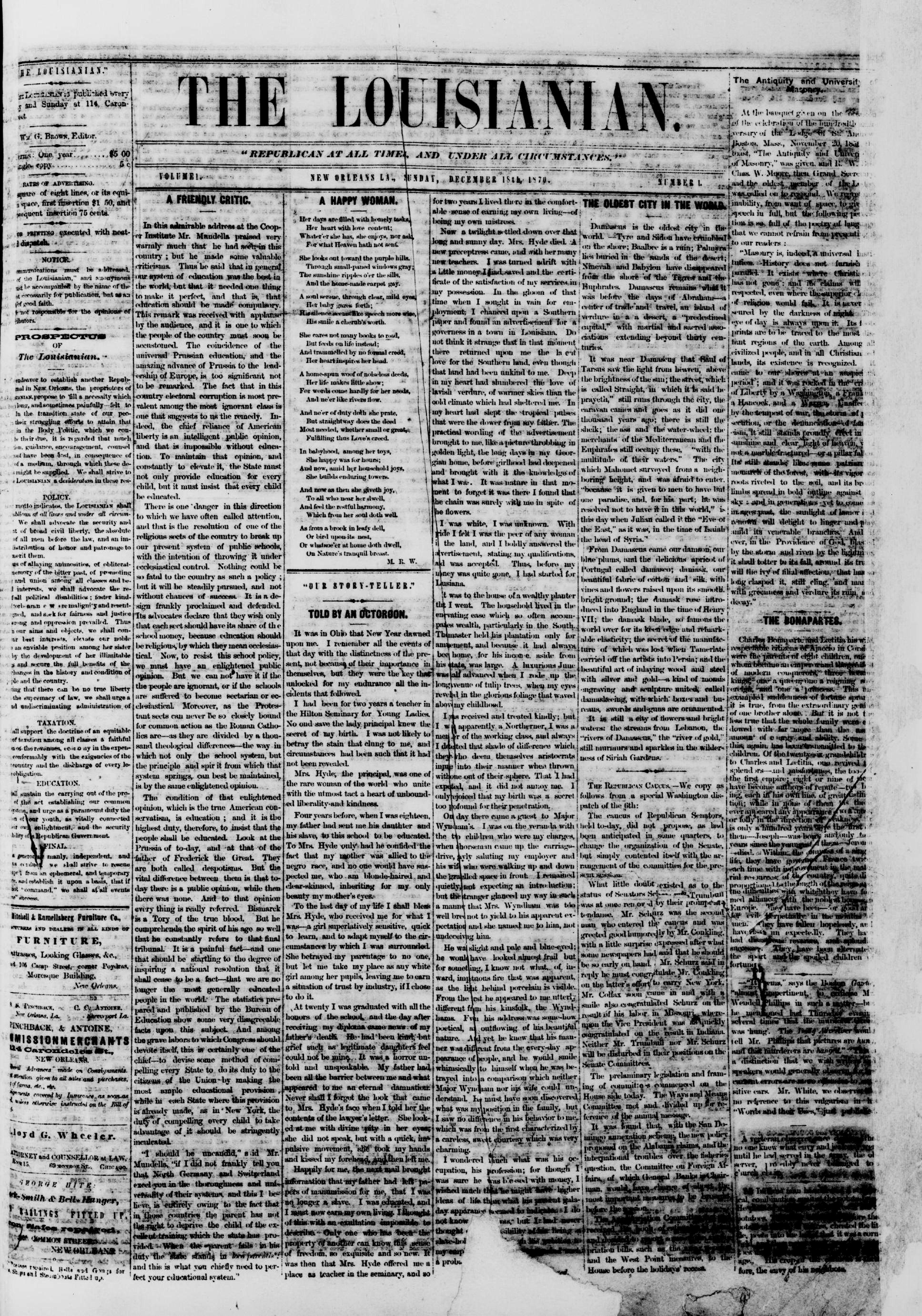
Front page for Louisianian, December 18, 1870

Louisianian, also referred to as New Orleans Louisianian and The Louisianian was a semi-weekly newspaper published in New Orleans, Louisiana. The Louisianian was founded in 1870 by P. B. S. Pinchback (1837–1921), an African-American legislator who was elevated to governor of Louisiana in 1872. The paper's motto was “Republican at all times, and under all circumstances”. It was one of the few 19th-century African-American newspapers that sought both black and white readers.

William G. Brown (1832–1883) was the paper’s first editor. He was born in New Jersey and raised in Jamaica and was of mixed ethnicity. He resigned as editor in 1872 to become the Louisiana state superintendent of education and was succeeded at the paper by Henry A. Corbin (1845–1878), who had attended college in Ohio. Corbin died in the yellow fever epidemic of 1878 and was succeeded by George Thompson Ruby (1841–1882), a free-born black who worked in New England and Haiti as a correspondent for Boston abolitionist James Redpath’s Pine and Palm. Ruby had settled in Union-occupied Louisiana in 1864 but was driven out two years later after trying to establish an integrated school. Before returning to the state in 1874 to edit The Louisianian, he published the Standard in Galveston, Texas and served one term in the Texas state senate. In 1878, Pinchback became editor-in-chief but delegated most of the work of producing the paper to graduate students from Straight University.

The education of African Americans was a major subject of reporting in The Louisianian. The paper reported at length on Straight University and took an interest in other black schools such as Howard University in Washington, D.C. It also encouraged desegregation of school systems throughout the United States. Recognizing the urgent need to educate black readers in politics, the Louisianian devoted special attention to coverage of the Louisiana state legislature and various Republican committees. It produced biographical sketches of black politicians, social leaders, and educators.

The paper also reported on immigration to the South, African missions, the activities of black Masons, and New Orleans entertainment events. Originally issued on Thursdays and Sundays in four pages, the Louisianian (renamed the Semi-Weekly Louisianian in 1871) was published as the Weekly Louisianian from 1872 until its demise in 1882.

Paul Trevigne published Centennial History of the Louisiana Negro in the Louisianian to commemorate the 100th anniversary of American Independence in 1876. The Library of Congress has issues from late 1870 until July 1871.
