= Adolphe Duhart =

Louisiana Creole writer and poet

- Born: February 1, 1830
- Died: January 10, 1908 (aged 77)
- Occupations: Poet; Writer; Playwright
- Writing career
- Pen name: Lélia D....t
- Language: French
- Period: 19th century
- Notable works: Des baisers Simple Histoire

Adolphe Duhart (1830–1908) was an American 19th-century poet, fiction writer, and playwright who spent most of his career in New Orleans, Louisiana. He was a free person of color and member of the Louisiana Creole community. His work, along with that of his contemporary Creole writers and artists, provides insights into the perspectives of free Creoles of Color who experienced the racial tensions common in 19th-century Louisiana. Duhart's writing at times also included feminist's themes and women's perspectives. He wrote in the French language and almost always used a pen name.

Duhart was among the most prolific of the writers and artists who were free people of color in New Orleans. He focused primarily on themes of racial and class politics of New Orleans in the mid to late 19th century.

== Biography ==
Duhart was born in New Orleans, Louisiana, on February 1, 1830. His parents, Adolphe Louis Duhart and Francoise Palmire Duhart (née Brouard) were immigrants to New Orleans from Saint-Domingue in Hispaniola. The family became a part of the Creole of color community in New Orleans which enjoyed freedoms of the free people of color in the antebellum period even though they lacked the status of white people in the community. Duhart's full name was Pierre Adolphe Duhart.

Duhart attended school in Paris, France, where he became versed in the ideas of equality that resulted from the French Revolution. On returning to New Orleans, still in the years preceding the American Civil War, Duhart became a part of the community that included free people of color who were dedicated to the ideals of equality. These included poets, writers, and community leaders such as Armand Lanusse, Joanni Questy, and Henry Louis Rey, among others.

Duhart served in the 1st Louisiana Native Guard for the Union during the American Civil War, which was a regiment made up wholly of men of color in New Orleans.

With other Creole people in New Orleans, Duhart became an active member of the spiritualism movement through the local organization known as Cercle Harmonique. This group was led by Henry Louis Rey, and it provided a forum for local Creoles to exchange ideas related to the arts, writing, and education, in addition to its spiritual and mystical purpose.

From the interactions in the Cercle Harmonique, the group of participants including Duhart formed a school for African-American children known as the La Société Catholique pour L’instruction des Orphelins dans l’Indigence, which was also known as the Couvent School. (Note: The name Couvent came from Marie Couvent who was a former slave who donated money to help establish the school.) The school educated African-American children at no or low cost, at a time in the Southern United States when education of African-Americans was discouraged and included anti-literacy laws. In 1869, Duhart became the principal of the school. Beginning in 1869, Duhart's focus appeared to be on his role as an educator, publishing only a small number of literary works after 1869.

Duhart married Odillia Boyer with whom he had two children, and both children died in infancy.

Duhart died at his home in New Orleans on January 10, 1908.

== Literature ==
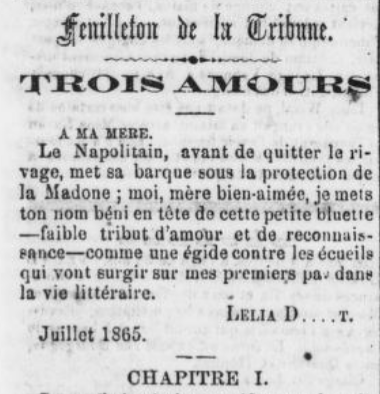
Original publication of the Trois Amours short story by Adolphe Duhart, published on August 15, 1865

Duhart's literary works were written in the French language. Many of his works were published in two New Orleans periodicals, La Tribune de la Nouvelle-Orléans and ''La Renaissance louisianaise''.

The antebellum period in New Orleans had a three caste system consisting of white people, slaves, and free people of color. The system resulted in inherent difficulties for the free people of color, and these difficulties persisted through the United States Civil War and into the Reconstruction era. These difficulties, together with feminist themes, were a frequent topic of Duhart's writing.

=== Poetry ===
"Poésie À Mademoiselle ***" (English "Poem for Miss ***" was Duhart's first published poetry, appearing in the French language newspaper La Renaissance Louisianaise in October 1862. The poem describes a Creole woman who sings despite immense emotional pain. The newspaper La Renaissance louisianaise was controlled by white people for an intended audience of white people. Considering the racial tensions of the times, Duhart feared racially-based retribution and so chose to publish using the pen name "Lélia D....t". The name Lélia was for his sister who died as a small child, (Note: Another source incorrectly states that Lélia was Duhart's child.) while the letters D and t separated by an ellipsis were a reference to his family name Duhart, intentionally using four periods. Duhart continued to use the Lélia D....t pen name, although he at times used the names "Lélia" or "Berthe". (Note: The name "Berthe" appears to have been the name of another child in the Duhart family who died at a young age, likely either a daughter or niece.)

La Tribune de la nouvelle-orléans on November 20, 1864, published for the first time a poem by Duhart which was entitled Des baisers (English: Kisses). The poem describes many different types of kisses, emphasizing a mother's kiss for her young child. It became the first of several works by Duhart that emphasized maternal love and feminism.

On April 25, 1865, La Tribune de la nouvelle-orléans published Duhart's poem Le 13 avril which lamented the assassination of President Abraham Lincoln. (Note: It is unclear why the poem was entitled Le 13 avril since Lincoln's assassination was on April 15, 1865, having been shot the day before.) Although it was published under his pen name, Duhart's publication of the poem was at significant personal risk because of the strong Confederate sympathies in New Orleans at the time.

In a discussion of the rise of African-American activism resulting from the United States Civil War, The Historic New Orleans Collection published an English translation of a passage in Duhart's poem "The South's Unending Rebellion". The passage reflects the sentiments of the French Revolution as follows:

"Do what we will, my lute can show no rage;
It preaches goodwill and sings fraternity;
To the oppressed, it says, 'Brothers, stand in courage,
The hour soon will toll; we must save liberty!'"

In 1866 a disastrous fire destroyed 50% of the buildings in Saint Domingue, Haiti, leaving approximately 9000 people homeless. In homage to the people of his birthplace, Duhart published a poem Pour les Incendiés de Saint Domingue dedicated to the victims of the fire.

A later poem, published in the October 7, 1866, issue of La Tribune de la nouvelle-orléans, was entitled: "“Berthe!... Lucie!... Marie!...Dolor”. The word dolor refers to pain, and the poem expresses the pain experienced by parents who lost children during infancy and early childhood. The title contains the names of his own children, and death during childhood was common during Duhart's era.

Centenary College of Louisiana published the first complete works of poetry by Duhart, titled Tempêtes et Éclairs, translating to English as "storms and lightening".

=== Drama and prose fiction ===
As a playwright, Duhart's French-language play Lélia ou la victime du préjugé was performed at the Théâtre d'Orléans in 1866. Duhart was an amateur actor and had contacts at the Théâtre d'Orléans. Duhart's play was staged at the theatre under his pen name. The play continued his themes concerning the plight of Louisiana creoles, womanhood, and racial inequality.

Trois Amours and Simple Histoire were novellas written by Duhart and published in La Tribune de la nouvelle-orleans over a period of months. Both works describe the plight of mixed race Louisiana Creoles involved in love affairs with people of other castes. These novellas further advanced Duhart's cause for racial equality.

As Duhart became principal of the Couvent School in 1869, he did not publish literary works again until 1888 when he published two short stories in The Weekly Louisianian. These were Une Legende and La Pluie, and both were written in French and used the pen name Lelia rather than Lelia D....t. Both are fictional stories with romantic themes with social commentary. La Pluie includes a passage that is critical of the violent and racist culture of New Orleans at the time.
