= The Shreveport Sun =

Louisiana African American newspaper

The Shreveport Sun is a historic newspaper serving Shreveport, Louisiana's African American community. Established in 1920, it is the oldest weekly newspaper for African Americans in Louisiana and became the largest weekly paper in North Louisiana. It is published on Thursdays. Louisiana Public Broadcasting aired a segment on the newspaper in its Folks series April 16, 1989. News and sports editor Andrew Harris was interviewed for it.

It was founded and published by Melvin Lee Collins Sr. He was a community leader and high school principal. After his death in 1962, he was succeeded by his son Melvin Lee Collins Jr., then in 1983 his granddaughter Sonya Collins Landry.

In February 1941 it reported on the game between Louisiana Negro Normal and Industrial Institute and white Louisiana Polytechnic Institute. In 1958, the Sun's reporting as well as other newspaper accounts of NAACP and its Louisiana leader R. L. Williams was submitted in a legal filing accusing the group's ogleganizing of being illegal in the state. The paper used the motto "Since 1920 Telling It Like It Is." It reported on beatings and arrests of African Americans without cause and accusing them of "resisting arrest". It also reported on displacement of African American educators who lost their positions with desegregation.

== See also ==
- List of African-American newspapers in Louisiana
- Media in Shreveport, Louisiana
- Shreveport–Bossier City metropolitan area
