= Henry Mayson =

American politician

Henry Mayson (born c. 1835, also known as Henry Mason) was a delegate to the 1868 Mississippi Constitutional Convention and a state legislator in Mississippi.

Mason was a leader in the African American community in Vicksburg, Mississippi. He served in the Mississippi House of Representatives and edited the Colored Citizen. It was the first of several newspapers for African Americans published in Mississippi during the Reconstruction era. He was one of the founders of a benevolent aid society in Bolivar County in 1871. A 1910 publication of the Mississippi Historical Society described him as an illiterate former African American political leader living in Monticello, Mississippi and referred to him as "old darkery".
