= Arrington High =

American journalist

Arrington High (1910–1988) was an American journalist and newspaper publisher. He published the Eagle Eye newspaper in Jackson, Mississippi, and was an advocate for African American civil rights.

== Biography ==
Arrington High was born in 1910 to an African American mother and a Euro-American father. He published the Eagle Eye newspaper in Jackson, Mississippi. High wrote and published the Eagle Eye from his own home, located on Maple Street in Jackson. This weekly newspaper, a two-page mimeographed broadside, was published for 14 years. Copies of the newspaper were sold for ten cents and were available for purchase directly from High or from the Farish Street Newsstand. High was known for being a strong, outspoken advocate for social equality and civil rights. The banner of Eagle Eye read, "America's greatest newspaper, bombarding segregation and discrimination."

Arrington High's journalism evoked criticism and more within Mississippi. Initially, High was fined for publishing criticism of school segregation. He was later surveilled by the Mississippi Sovereignty Commission. He was arrested for selling literature without a permit. After publishing criticism of white segregationists consorting with prostitutes at a "colored" brothel, he was committed to the Mississippi State Asylum (originally opened in 1935 as the Mississippi Lunatic Asylum) in Whitfield near Jackson in October 1957. There he was forced to work at a local dairy isolated in the woods.

On February 7 at 5:04 am, he went out to milk the cows and begin his escape. After entering a car caravan, he escaped Mississippi by climbing in a casket to be shipping to Chicago. At the 12th street station in Chicago, he was greeted by Dr. T.R.M. Howard who had himself migrated from Mississippi several years before. He continued publishing his newssheet from Chicago. He promoted conspiracy theories in his later publishing career. He died while living with his daughter in Chicago.
