= Jackson Eagle Eye =

Newspaper published in Jackson, Mississippi

The Jackson Eagle Eye was a newspaper for African Americans published by Arrington High in Jackson, Mississippi.
