= Albert Lancaster =

Belgian astronomer and meteorologist

Albert Benoît Marie Lancaster (1849–1908) was a Belgian astronomer and meteorologist.

He was a contemporary of and assistant to Jean-Charles Houzeau.

== Life ==
He was born on 24 May 1849 in Mons and died on 4 February 1908 in Uccle.

== Career ==
Lancaster was hired in 1875 as a meteorologist at the observatory in Brussels and in 1898 became the director of the meteorological department of the observatory in Uccle.

In addition to the meteorological papers in scientific journals, he was also famous for publishing along with Jean-Charles Houzeau his magnum opus the Bibliographie générale de l'astronomie jusqu'en 1880.

At the time of his death he was the editor in chief of the journal "Ciel et Terre" which he founded in 1880.
