= Louis Charles Roudanez =

American journalist

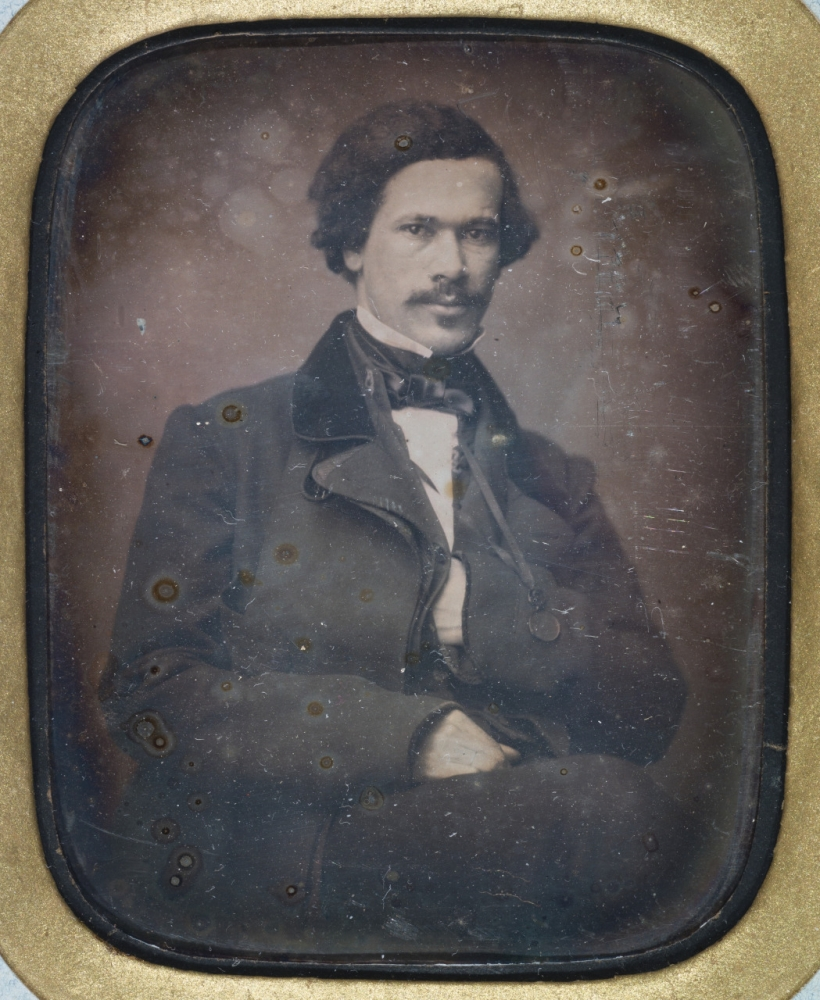
Portrait of Roudanez (from The Historic New Orleans Collection)

Louis Charles Roudanez (1823-1890) was an American physician and newspaper publisher. He cofounded L'Union (1862-1864), one of the first Black newspapers in the US South and the first bilingual (French-English) newspaper run by African Americans in the United States. After it folded, he cofounded La Tribune de la Nouvelle-Orleans (The New Orleans Tribune) (1864-1870), the nation's first daily Black newspaper, which was also bilingual.

Roudanez, who was a Creole of color, founded the paper with his older brother, Jean Baptiste Roudanez. They hired Paul Trevigne to serve as editor, a role he continued with the second paper. Also a free man of color, he helped Roudanez promote the causes of Republican Unionism and abolition of slavery.

== Biography ==
=== Early years ===
Louis Charles Roudanez was born in 1823 in St. James Parish, Louisiana. His parents were Louis Roudanez, a white French merchant, and Aimée Potens (c. 1793–1878), a free woman of color of African and French descent. She had been born enslaved in Saint-Domingue, and was brought to New Orleans after the revolution, where she gained freedom. They had two sons together, Jean Baptiste and Louis Charles Roudanez.

Throughout his life, Roudanez identified as a person of color. Like many Creoles from New Orleans, he went to France for his higher education, receiving a medical degree there. He returned to the U.S. and enrolled in medical school for a second degree at Dartmouth College (some sources erroneously write Cornell University).

Returning to New Orleans, Roudanez opened a medical practice.

=== Career ===
In 1862, after the US Army defeated Confederate forces and captured New Orleans, Roudanez founded L'Union, a newspaper primarily serving the Creole or free people of color of Louisiana. It was published in French and English. Paul Trevigne served as its editor. It was strongly Republican. Also working with them was Jean-Charles Houzeau, a francophone astronomer and author from Belgium, who supported abolition.

After L'Union folded, Roudanez founded La Tribune de la Nouvelle Orléans (The New Orleans Tribune) in 1864, the first daily Black newspaper in the United States. It was also bilingual. Both newspapers were published at 527 Conti Street in the French Quarter, where Roudanez installed a printing press acquired from New York in 1864.

Postwar political rivalries rose with Northern Republicans leading Reconstruction efforts in the South (who were referred to derisively as carpetbaggers). They and the Louisiana free men of color disputed over which Republican candidates to support in the contentious gubernatorial election of 1868. Roudanez was ostracized and his paper lost support.

Roudanez was part of a faction that split off from the local Republican Party over the party's nomination of Northerners as candidates to state office. Described as "Mulattoes" by northerners, he and most free people of color before the war spoke French as their first language, were raised Catholic, and were of mixed-race heritage. As a group, these free people of color were relatively prosperous, and some of their families had lived freely in New Orleans and the area for generations. The free people of color had developed as a separate class between the white Creole French and the mass of enslaved African Americans, who were emancipated as freedmen.

Roudanez and other men like him had their own concerns such as universal voting rights for all African American men, access to schools and public institutions, and other legal protections. They were joined by some local white people. They believed that Republicans from the North, described derisively as carpetbaggers, competed against them and tried to divide them from freedmen, who constituted the overwhelming proportion of the Black majority population in the state. Among the white Republicans who opposed Roudanez and Trévigne was Thomas W. Conway, a fierce critic.

Conway traveled to Washington D.C. after the election to get the national Republican Party to decertify Roudanez's paper as one of two official Republican Party publications used to print notices and official publications. According to Roudanez's colleague Jean-Charles Houzeau, several members of Roudanez's faction were kicked out of the party after the election.

In the wake of the fracas, Roudanez's paper lost standing and support. It closed in 1868 but reopened when Henry C. Warmoth won, who was the white establishment Republican Yankee candidate. Warmoth watered down and vetoed civil rights legislation and was eventually run out of office over allegations of corruption.

=== Death ===
Roudanez died in 1890.

== Legacy ==
In 2015, descendants arranged for an historic marker to be placed on Roudanez's tomb in Saint Louis Cemetery No. 1, Alley 9. That same year, a Memorial Forum was held to recognize the 125th anniversary of Roudanez's death.

In 2018 a historical marker was placed at the former site of the two newspapers, 527 Conti Street.

== Representation in other media ==
- Hidden History: The Story of the New Orleans Tribune (2016), is a short documentary film about Roudanez and his paper and includes research into his family.
- OperaCreole produced Les Lions de la Reconstruction (2018), an original one-act opera about Roudanez and Paul Trevigne to celebrate New Orleans's tricentennial. It premiered in New Orleans at the Marigny Opera House on October 19–21, 2018. The libretto was written by Givonna Joseph, cofounder of OperaCréole, with music drawn from 19th-century free composers of color.
