= Louis Niesten =

Belgian astronomer

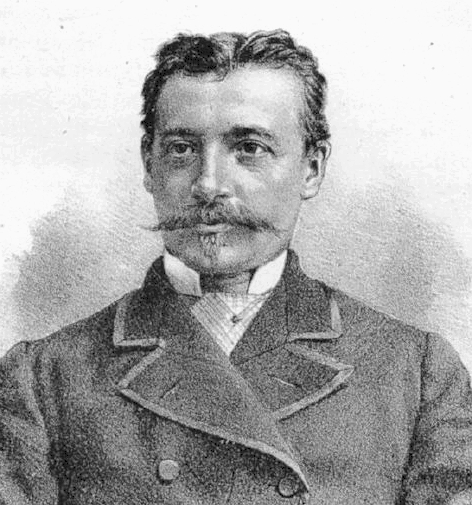
Louis Niesten portrayed in 1883

Louis Niesten (1844–1920) was a Belgian astronomer working at the Brussels Royal Observatory. In 1877 he observed Mars and created a detailed map of its surface features.

He organized an expedition to Santiago de Chile to observe the Venus transit the Sun in 1882. A second Belgian expedition (led by Jean-Charles Houzeau) travelled to San Antonio, Texas to determine the planet's parallax during the same transit. Both parties used a specially designed heliometer for this purpose.

A crater on Mars was named in his honor.
