= James J. Spelman =

American journalist and politician (1841–1894)

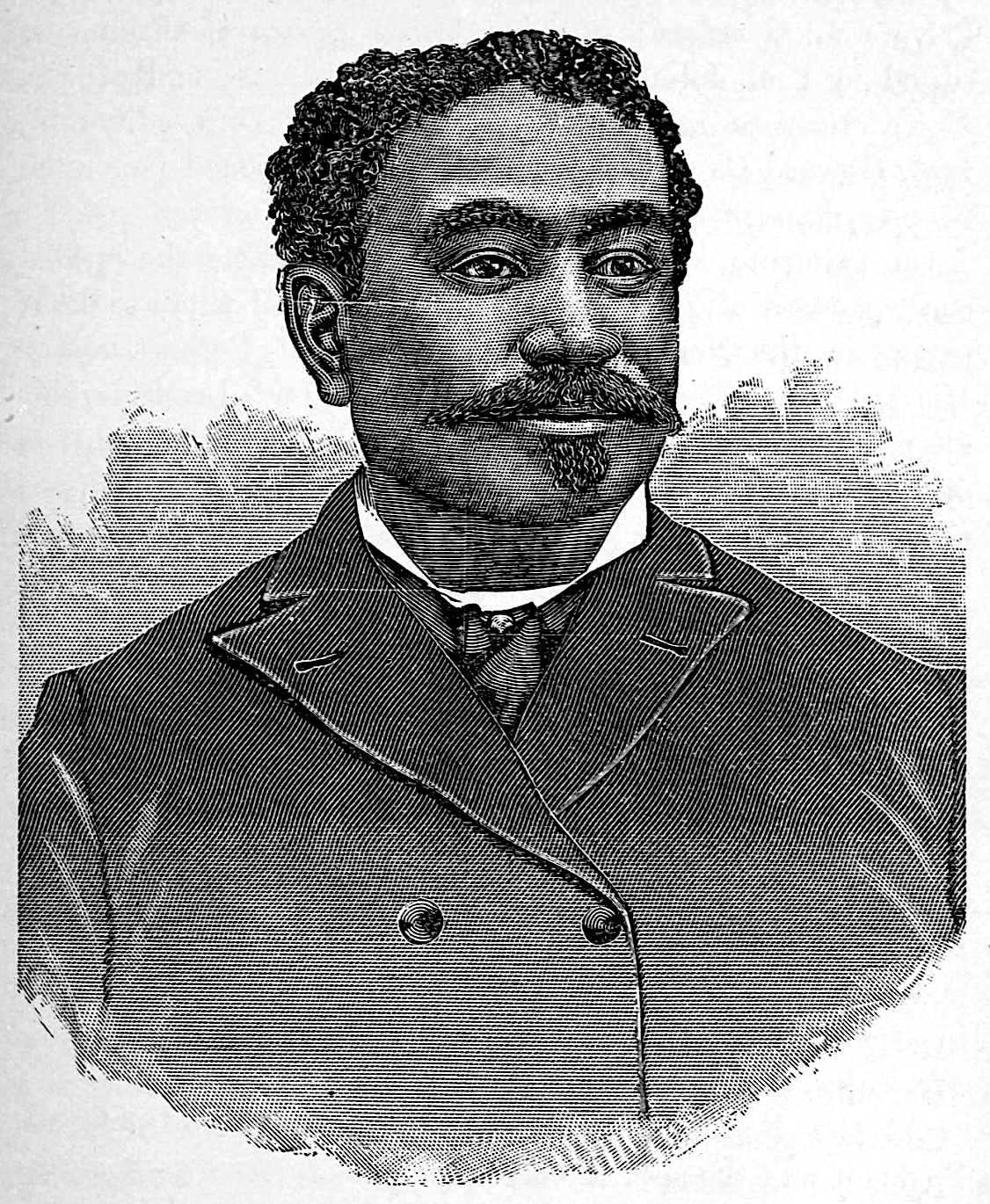
- Spelman in 1887
- Born: January 18, 1841; Norwich, Connecticut, U.S.
- Died: May 25, 1894 (aged 53); Jackson, Mississippi, U.S.
- Occupations: Journalist, politician
- Political party: Republican
- Spouse: Anna D. Lavender (m. 1894)
- Children: 4

James J. Spelman (January 18, 1841 – June 25, 1894) was an American journalist and politician active in New York and Mississippi. His early career was as a journalist and a stage performer and manager in New York City. During the American Civil War (1861–1865), Spelman helped encourage the use of African-American soldiers, and once they were allowed, helped recruit. After the war, he moved to Mississippi where he continued his work as a journalist and served for six years in the state legislature.

== Early life ==
James J. Spelman was born in Norwich, Connecticut, on January 18, 1841. His father was "Pop" Spelman and was for more than thirty years the pastor of Abyssinia Baptist Church in Waverley Place, New York City. He attended public schools in Connecticut until 1855 when he moved to New York City with his family.

In 1859, he began to work for newspapers as a carrier and dealer. During that year, he became a regular contributor to the Weekly Anglo-African and later to its successor, the Pine and Palm. In New York he became acquainted with many leading journalists of the era, including Horace Greeley and George Alfred Townsend. He also organized a dramatic company and organized stage shows along with Elizabeth Taylor Greenfield. Among the performances he directed was an April 1862 performance at the Metropolitan Assembly Room in New York City which was organized to raise money to improve the lands donated by abolitionist Gerrit Smith to freed slaves.

== New York City during the Civil War ==
In 1861, the Civil War started and Spelman was among a large number of African Americans that assembled at the Metropolitan Assembly in New York City, but which were denied the chance to enlist as initially only white men were accepted as soldiers. He then was a member of the committee which sought to organize the Fremont Legion (named for abolitionist General, John C. Frémont), which was never accepted. Later in the war he was active in raising recruits from men involved in New York City public schools which formed a battalion known as the "Shaw Cadets" to which Spelman was elected Major. The nickname came from Robert Gould Shaw, who was famous for leading black soldiers at the Battle of Fort Wagner. The organization gave several exhibitions, but was not enlisted into the Union Army.

Spelman's role in New York black society is illustrated in his giving assistance to Perry Douglass, the half brother of Frederick Douglass. Perry and his family arrived in New York City in 1867 and Spelman paid for their continuing on to meet Frederick in Rochester in July 1867, which Frederick described as "an event altogether too affecting for words to describe".

== Political and journalism career in Mississippi ==
In 1868, Spelman moved to Mississippi with the aid of Rufus L. Perry and the African Civilization Society where he worked as a teacher for the Freedmen's Bureau. In July 1869 he was appointed justice of the peace and alderman of the city of Canton, Mississippi, by military commander Adelbert Ames and Assistant Internal Revenue Assessor Boutwell on the recommendation of B. B. Eggleston, who was the Internal Revenur Assessor. When Mississippi was re-admitted into the union in 1869, Spelman was elected to the Mississippi House of Representatives to represent Madison County. He served for six years and served as chairman of the Committee on Corporations and was a member of the Judiciary and the Ways and Means Committees. He also gave noted addresses on a Civil Rights Bill and on the occasion of the death of Charles Sumner. Spelman was also a leader in the Colored Conventions Movement, and was a vice-president of the colored national convention in January 1869 in Washington, D.C., and led by Douglass. Spelman was closely associated with Mississippi Governor James L. Alcorn. He was made aid-de-camp on the governor's staff and given the rank of lieutenant-colonel in the state militia. He later was promoted to colonel of the first regiment of militia.

In the 1870s, Spelman was co-founder with James Lynch of the paper, the Jackson Colored Citizen and in 1870 he was a special correspondent of the New York Tribune. In 1870, Spelman was elected vice-president of the newly organized Republican Press Association. Later in his career, Spelman was the editor of the 'Baptist Messenger and was a regular correspondent of a number of papers using pseudonyms. One example was Phillip A. Bell's The Elevator, to which he contributed under the name "Private L. Overture".

In 1871 the legislature established Alcorn University, and Spelman was appointed by Governor Alcorn to the board of trustees and was elected secretary. Spelman was a delegate to the 1872 Republican National Convention in Philadelphia and was a chosen presidential elector. In 1873, Adelbert Ames was elected governor, and Spelman was appointed to his staff and made assistant commissioner of immigration. In 1876, he again was a delegate to the Republican National Convention, and served on the committee on rules. At the convention he supported Benjamin H. Bristow first, and then Rutherford B. Hayes.

Spelman was appointed by President Hayes as consul to Port au Platte, San Domingo with the support of Senator Blanche Bruce, but he declined the appointment. He took an appointment as special agent to the post office headquartered at St. Louis, Missouri. In 1881 he was nominated to the position of Secretary of State of Mississippi but was blocked by Democrats. In 1884 he was made superintendent of education by the American Baptist Home Mission Society in Mississippi, but he left that position within the year to take charge of the colored exhibits department of the World Cotton Centennial in New Orleans at the call of Bruce. At the exposition he was also a commissioner to the American exposition.

He was involved in education, and was secretary of the city school board of Jackson with the support of the board which was dominated by Democrats. Later in his career he was appointed U. S. Timber Agent, but resigned in 1890 due to ill health. In 1892, Spelman launched a pro-Republican paper, the Standard.

== Other activities ==
Spelman was an active temperance advocate and was a member of the National Temperance Society. He was also involved in freemasonry and in the Kings of Labor. He joined the Baptist church in 1853 and was at one time the president of the Baptist State Sabbath School Convention, was the first Sabbath School missionary of the American Baptist Publication Society in Mississippi, was recording secretary of the Foreign Mission Convention, and was chairman of the National Baptist Temperance Committee.

== Family and death ==
In 1870 he married Anna D. Lavender of Jackson, Mississippi and the couple had four children.

Spelman died on June 25, 1894, in Jackson, Mississippi. He was buried on June 26.
