= Jean-Charles Houzeau =

Belgian astronomer and journalist

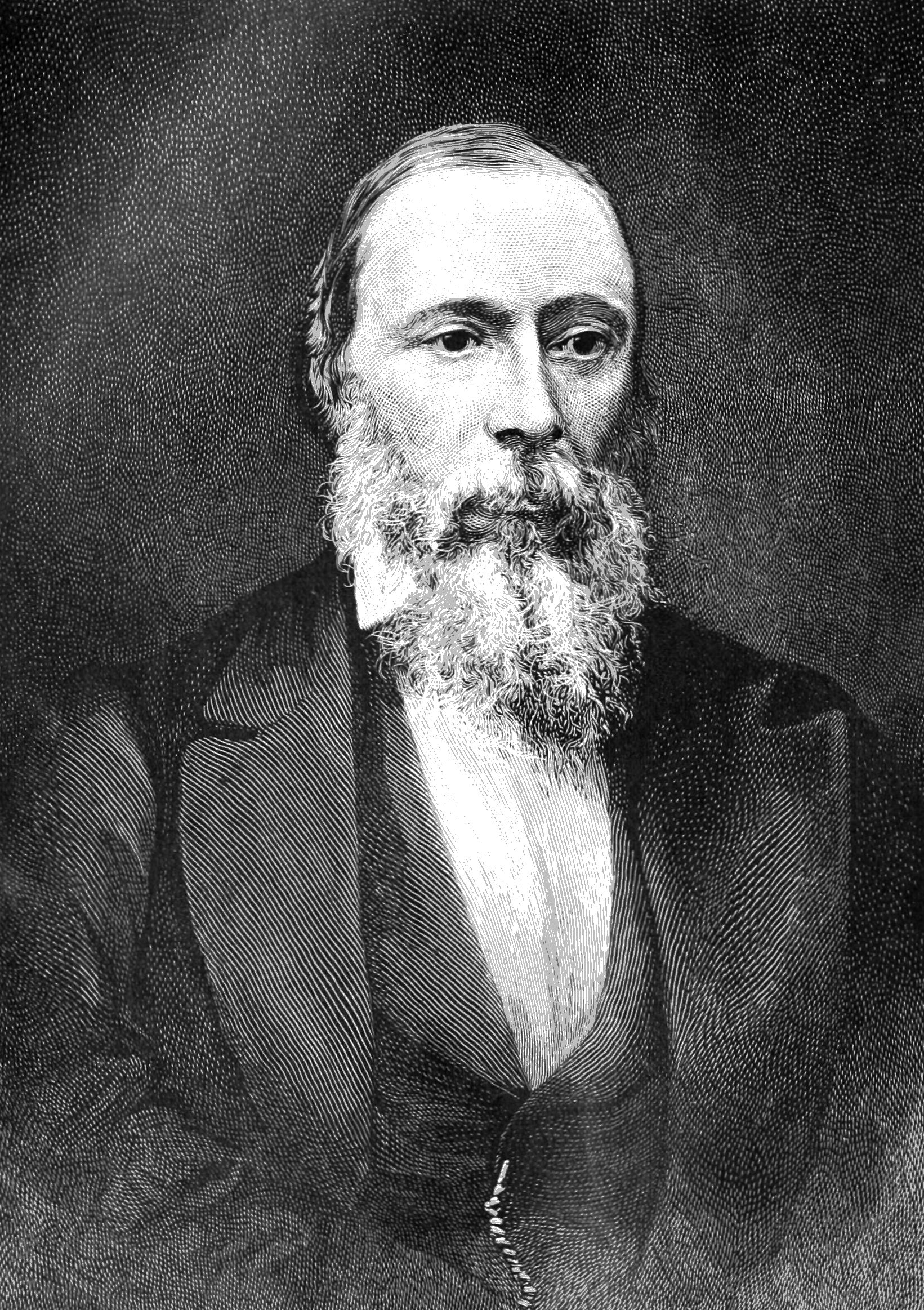
Portrait of Houzeau published in The Popular Science Monthly, 1891

Jean-Charles Houzeau de Lehaie (October 7, 1820 – July 12, 1888) was a Belgian astronomer and journalist. A French speaker, Houzeau lost his position at the Belgian Royal Observatory in 1849 due to his left-leaning political beliefs.

He moved to Texas in 1858, where he sided with unionists and abolitionists in the American Civil War, then relocated to New Orleans in 1864. In New Orleans, he worked with Dr. Louis Charles Roudanez at the newspapers he founded in the 1860s. American historian Eric Foner called Houzeau "one of the most remarkable men to take part in the saga of Reconstruction."

Houzeau migrated to Jamaica in the postwar years. After reinstatement from an observatory in Brussels, he returned to Europe to work. He came back to Texas for an astronomical event. He published stirring memoirs and other accounts of his adventures and contacts during his travels, as well as several works on astronomical subjects.

== Life ==
Houzeau was born in 1820 in Havré (a small city near Mons); at the time it was within the Netherlands, and was later included in the independent nation of Belgium. From 1842, he worked as a voluntary assistant at the Brussels Observatory and began writing papers. He eventually became the observatory's director. He travelled frequently during his career, to Paris, the United Kingdom, United States, Mexico, and Jamaica.

After being removed from the Belgian Royal Observatory for "outspoken political views", Houzeau migrated to the United States. In Texas by 1858, he first worked as a surveyor. He moved to Uvalde, where he organized early scientific expeditions.

He believed in the abolition of slavery and aided the escape of some notable unionists from San Antonio before the American Civil War. He soon fled to Mexico, disguised as a Mexican laborer for his escape.

Later in New Orleans, when the city had been taken by Federal forces, he worked with Dr. Louis Charles Roudanez, a physician who founded the bilingual New Orleans Tribune - La Tribune de la Nouvelle-Orléans in 1864. During a period of fierce intraparty rivalries, Roudanez lost outside support and the newspaper closed after the election in 1868 of a Northern Republican as governor of Louisiana.

Houzeau then migrated to Jamaica, where he lived for eight years. He kept his European contacts and was reinstated as director of the Royal Observatory in Brussels. He returned to Belgium and his work there as an astronomer.

In December 1882, however, Houzeau made a return trip to Texas. He led a scientific expedition, accompanied by Albert Benoît Lancaster and Charles Emile Stuyvaert, to San Antonio to observe a locally visible transit of Venus across the face of the sun. At the time, this was a method of measuring time and gravity.

== Impact ==
According to historian Eric Foner, Houzeau was a pivotal figure in Reconstruction. He transformed the New Orleans Tribune into a widely respected journal in Northern Republican circles and even in Europe (in 1865 it received a letter from Victor Hugo). He “broadened its message to encompass a coherent program embracing black suffrage, equality before the law, desegregation of Louisiana’s schools, the opening of New Orleans streetcars to blacks, and division of the plantations among the freedmen. And...[he] made the alliance between free blacks and the freed the cornerstone of Tribune politics, as the only means of preventing the revolution unleashed by the Civil War from succumbing to reaction.”

== Works ==
His published works include:

- Des turbines, de leur construction, du calcul de leur puissance et de leur application à l'industrie (On Turbines, Their Construction, Calculation of Their Power, and Their Application in Industry / Paris, L.M. Augustin, 1839) his first published work, issued when he was 19 years old;
- Atlas de toutes les étoiles visibles à l'oeil nu, formé d'après l'observation directe, dans les deux hémisphères (Atlas of All Stars Visible To the Naked Eye, Developed From Direct Observation in Two Hemispheres / Mons, Belgium, Hector Manceaux, 1878)
- Vade-mecum de l'astronome (The Astronomer's Handbook / Brussels, F. Hayez, 1882);
- Bibliographie générale de L'astronomie depuis L'origine de L'imprimerie Jusqu'en 1880 (General bibliography of Astronomy From Its First Printed Works Until 1880 / Brussels, F. Hayez, 1882–1887);
- Règles de climatologie (Rules of Climatology /Brussels, Jamar, no date); and
- Les facultés mentales des animaux (The mental faculties of animals / Paris & Brussels, Mons, Hector Manceaux 1872).

=== Travel memoirs ===
- La terreur blanche au Texas et mon évasion (The White Terror in Texas and My Escape), Brussels: Ve Parent et Fils, 1862, in French
- My Passage at the New Orleans Tribune (published in French and English, 1872; reprinted 1984 in English)

== See also ==
- Alphonse Toussenel
- Antoine Laurent Apollinaire Fée
- Karl Kessler
