= The New Orleans Tribune =

African American newspaper in New Orleans founded in 1864

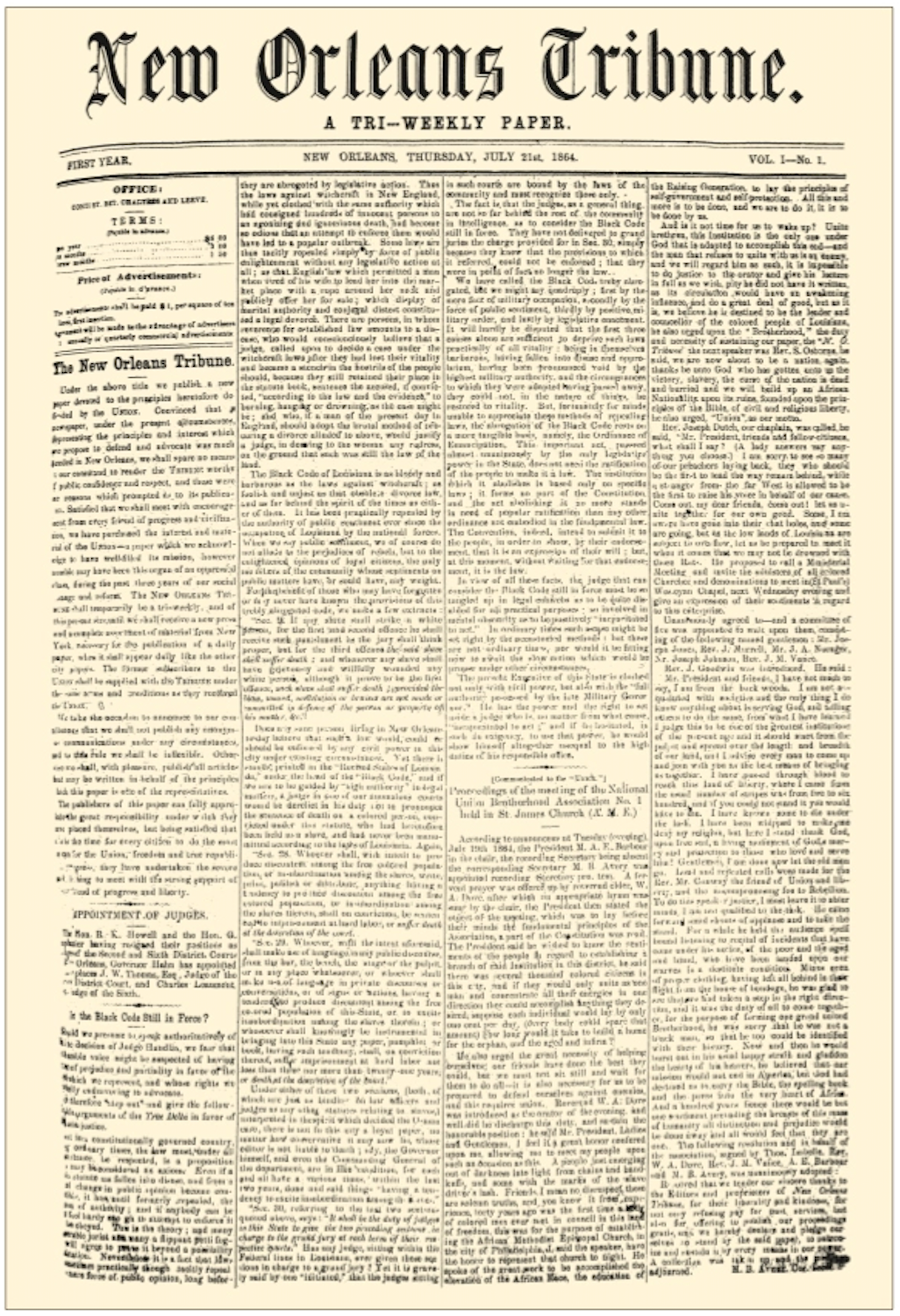
Inaugural Edition of the New Orleans Tribune, July 21, 1864

The New Orleans Tribune / La Tribune de la Nouvelle-Orléans was a newspaper serving the African-American community of New Orleans, Louisiana. It was the first Black daily newspaper in the United States.

== History ==
The Tribune was founded in 1864 by Louis Charles Roudanez, a free man of color. He had also published L'Union, which had folded earlier that year. The Tribune was the first Black daily newspaper published in the United States, and the first bilingual one; it was published in French and English.

Born in Louisiana, Roudanez had studied in Paris, France to become a doctor and received additional medical training at Dartmouth College to become a doctor.

In addition to his medical practice, Roudanez founded two newspapers. He founded L'Union in 1862, which folded, and the Tribune in 1864. He published his paper in French and English, as a large part of the New Orleans population, both whites and Creoles of color, was still French speaking. It was the first bilingual and daily, black newspaper in the United States.

Jean-Charles Houzeau, a Francophone astronomer, author, and abolitionist from Belgium, worked with Roudanez at both his newspapers, beginning in 1864. He wrote an account of these experiences, along with the volcanic politics of the day, My Passage at the New Orleans Tribune: A Memoir of the Civil War Era, which was first published in French in Belgium.

During Reconstruction, there was strong competition within the Republican Party in Louisiana. Severe intraparty feuding took place over Republican political candidates for the 1868 gubernatorial election. Some local men of color such as Roudanez, who had achieved education and social standing before the war, were opposed to white "carpetbaggers" (men from the North) running as candidates.

Louisiana Creole writer and poet Adolphe Duhart frequently published his original works in The New Orleans Tribune. His works frequently included equal rights causes and feminism.

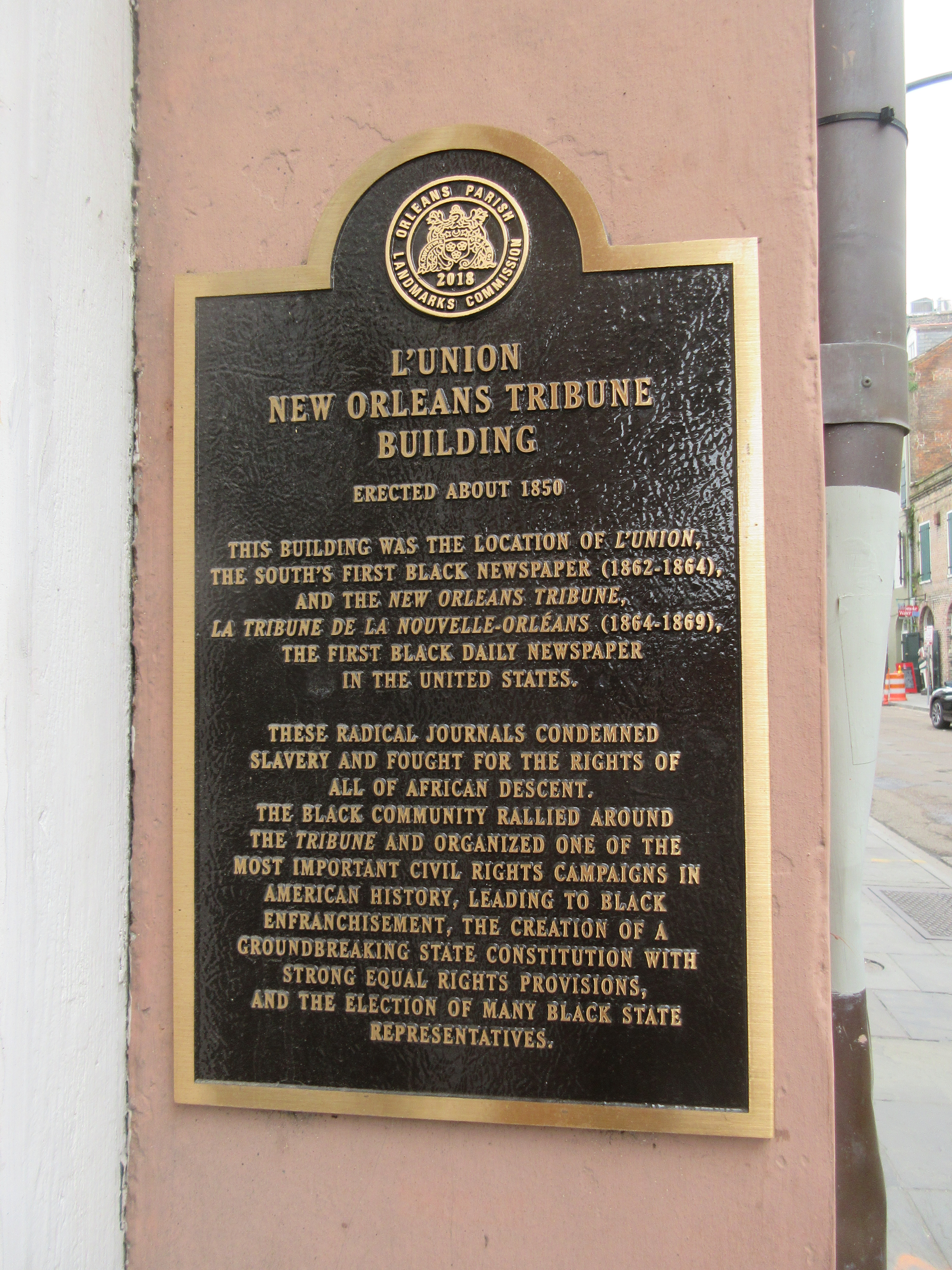
Historical Marker at 527 Conti Street, New Orleans, for the New Orleans Tribune newspaper

The paper lost national Republican Party support and closed in 1870. It was briefly revived after the election of Northern Republican Henry C. Warmoth as governor of the state.

== Legacy ==
- The original site of the New Orleans Tribune, at 527 Conti Street, New Orleans, is commemorated with an historical marker.
- Roudanez's life has been explored in a short documentary Hidden History (2016).
- A publication by the same name was founded in 1985 and is published by McKenna Publishing Co.
