= Louisiana Creole people =

Ethnic group of Louisiana, USA

Louisiana Creoles
Créoles de la Louisiane (French) Moun Kréyòl la Lwizyàn (Louisiana Creole) Criollos de Luisiana (Spanish)

Total population
- Indeterminable

Regions with significant populations
- Louisiana, Mississippi, California, Texas, Mexico (Veracruz)

Languages
- Southern American English, Louisiana French, Isleño Spanish and Louisiana Creole

Religion
- Predominantly Roman Catholic

Related ethnic groups
- Other French Louisianians, African American Louisianians, Acadians, Native Louisianians, Saint-Domingue Creoles, Louisianian Isleños

Historical affiliations

Kingdom of France 1718–1763
Kingdom of Spain 1763–1802
French First Republic 1802–1803
United States of America 1803–1861
Confederate States of America 1861–1862
United States of America 1862–present

Louisiana Creoles (French: Créoles de la Louisiane, Louisiana Creole: Moun Kréyòl la Lwizyàn, Spanish: Criollos de Luisiana) are a French Louisianian ethnic group descended from the inhabitants of colonial Louisiana during the periods of French and Spanish rule, before it became a part of the United States or in the early years under the United States. They share cultural ties such as the traditional use of the French, Spanish, and Creole languages, (Note: As of 2007, according to anthropologist Samuel G. Armistead, even in New Iberia and Baton Rouge, where the Creole people are a mix of French and Spanish, they primarily speak French as a second language and their names and surnames are French-descended. In Saint Bernard Parish and Galveztown, some people are descendants of colonial Spanish settlers, and a few elders still speak Spanish.) and predominantly practice Catholicism.

The term Créole was originally used by French Creoles to distinguish people born in Louisiana from those born elsewhere, thus drawing a distinction between Old-World Europeans (and Africans) and their descendants born in the New World. The word is not a racial label—people of European, African, or mixed ancestry can and have identified as Louisiana Creoles since the 18th century. After the Sale of Louisiana, the term "Creole" took on a more political meaning and identity, especially for those people of Latinate culture. The Catholic Latin-Creole culture in Louisiana contrasted greatly to the Anglo-Protestant culture of Yankee Americans.

Although the terms "Cajun" and "Creole" today are often seen as separate identities, Cajuns have historically been known as Creoles. Currently some Louisianians may identify exclusively as either Cajun or Creole, while others embrace both identities.

Creoles of French descent, including those of Québécois or Acadian lineage, have historically comprised the majority of white-identified Creoles in Louisiana. In the early 19th century, refugees fleeing the Haitian Revolution arrived in New Orleans, some having been deported after residence in Cuba: both whites with their slaves and free people of color, they doubled the city's population and helped to strengthen its Francophone culture. Later 19th-century (mainly Catholic) immigrants to Louisiana, such as Irish, Germans, and Italians, also married into the Creole group.

New Orleans, in particular, has always retained a significant historical population of Creoles of color, a group mostly consisting of free persons of multiracial European and African descent. As Creoles of color had received higher rights and education under Spanish and French rule than did their Black American counterparts, many of the United States' earliest writers, poets, and civil activists of color (e.g., Victor Séjour, Rodolphe Desdunes and Homère Plessy) were Louisiana Creoles. Today, many of these Creoles of color have assimilated into (and contributed to) Black American culture, while some have retained their distinct identity within the broader African American ethnic group.

Today, most Creoles are found in the Greater New Orleans region or in Acadiana. Louisiana is known as the Creole State.

New Orleans Creoles at one point lived mainly in what is now the French Quarter or Vieux Carré (French “Old Square”). The broad Canal Street, with a large median for streetcars, divided the Creoles from the Anglos. The median became known as the “neutral ground” between the two cultures. Today, all medians in New Orleans are called neutral grounds rather than medians.

== Origin ==
=== First French period ===
Map of North America in 1750, before the French and Indian War (part of the international Seven Years' War (1756 to 1763)).

The Flag of French Louisiana

Through both the French and Spanish (late 18th century) regimes, parochial and colonial governments used the term Creole for ethnic French and Spanish people born in the New World. Parisian French was the predominant language among colonists there.

Their dialect evolved to contain local phrases and slang terms. French Creoles spoke what became known as Louisiana French. It was spoken by ethnic religious French and Spanish and the French and Romantics of Creole descent.

An estimated 7,000 European immigrants settled in Louisiana in the 18th century, one percent of the French population present at the founding of the United States. There is record of the signing of constitutional agreements in prominent French Creole Plantation Homes. Southern Louisiana attracted considerably more Frenchmen due to the presence of the Catholic Church. Most other regions were reached by Protestant missionaries instead, which may have reached other parts, including the islands.

French Canadians intermarried with Algonquin people with whom they shared French language, culture, and heritage as a tribal community. In addition, Canadian records, especially those of the Roman Catholic Church, record marriages as early as the 1520s.

There are historical links to the same groups traveling along the length of the Mississippi River to what became parts of Texas. At one point Jefferson Parish started in or around Orange County, Texas, and reach all the way to New Orleans' southernmost regions next to Barataria Island. This was also possibly the original name of Galveston.

After enduring a journey of over two months across the Atlantic Ocean, the colonists faced challenges upon reaching the Louisiana frontier. Living conditions were difficult: they had to face an often hostile environment, including a hot and humid climate and tropical diseases. Many died during the crossing or soon after arrival.

Hurricanes, which were unknown in France, occasionally struck the coast. The Mississippi Delta suffered from periodic yellow fever epidemics. Additionally, Europeans introduced diseases like malaria and cholera, which flourished due to mosquitoes and poor sanitation. These challenging conditions hindered the colonization efforts. Furthermore, French settlements and forts could not always provide adequate protection from enemy assaults. Isolated colonists were also at risk from attacks by Indigenous peoples.

The Natchez massacred 250 colonists in Lower Louisiana in response to their encroachment on Natchez lands. Natchez warriors took Fort Rosalie (now Natchez, Mississippi) by surprise, killing many settlers. During the next two years, the French attacked the Natchez in return, causing them to flee or, when captured, be deported as slaves to Saint-Domingue (later Haiti).

In the colonial period, men tended to marry after becoming financially established. French settlers often married African women, some of whom were imported as slaves. Intermarriage created a large multiracial Creole population.

==== Indentured servants and Pelican girls ====
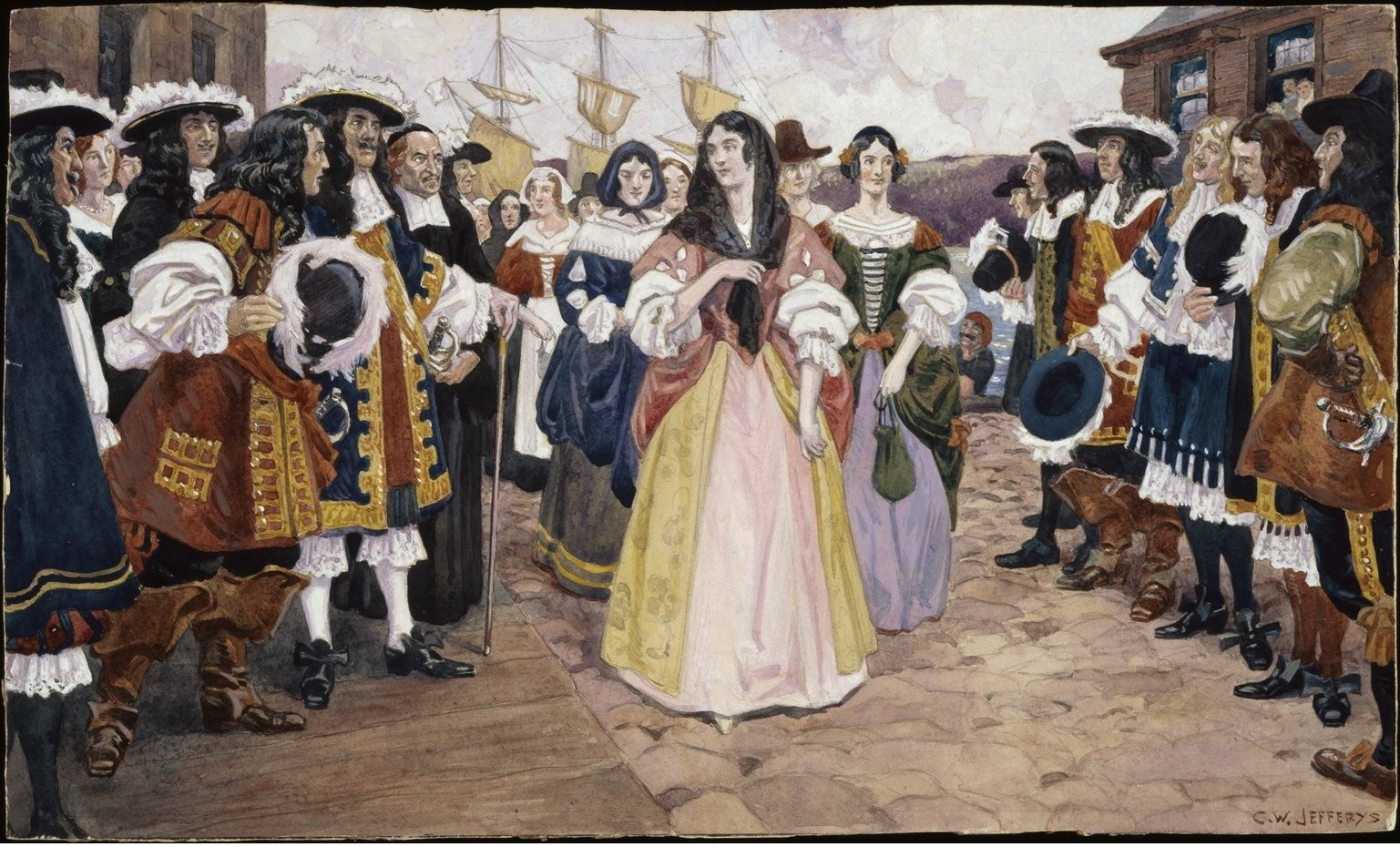
Casquette girls, or Filles du Roi were girls sent to New France as wives for colonists. In Louisiana, they became known as Pelican girls.

Aside from French government representatives and soldiers, colonists included mostly young men. Some labored as engagés (indentured servants); they were required to remain in Louisiana for a contracted length of service, to pay back the cost of passage and board. Engagés in Louisiana generally worked for seven years, while their masters provided them housing, food, and clothing.

Starting in 1698, French merchants were required to transport men to the colonies in proportion to the ships' cargo. Some were bound by three-year indenture contracts. Under John Law and the Compagnie du Mississippi, efforts to increase the use of engagés in the colony were made, notably including German settlers whose contracts became defunct when the company went bankrupt in 1731.

During this time, in order to increase the colonial population, the government recruited young Frenchwomen, filles à la cassette (in English, casket girls, referring to the casket or case of belongings they brought with them), to travel to the colony and marry colonial soldiers. The king financed dowries for each girl. This practice was similar to events in 17th-century Quebec when about 800 filles du roi (daughters of the king) were recruited to immigrate to New France under the financial sponsorship of Louis XIV.

French authorities also deported some female criminals to the colony. For example, in 1721, the ship La Baleine brought close to 90 women of childbearing age from the prison of La Salpêtrière in Paris to Louisiana. Most found husbands among the male residents. These women, known as The Baleine Brides many of whom were likely felons or prostitutes, were suspected of having sexually transmitted diseases. Such events inspired Manon Lescaut (1731), a novel written by the Abbé Prévost, which was later adapted as an opera.

Historian Joan Martin claimed that little documentation describes casket girls (considered among the ancestors of French Creoles) who were transported to Louisiana. (The Ursuline order of nuns, who were said to chaperone the girls until they married, denied the casket girl myth.) The system of plaçage that continued into the 19th century resulted in many young white men having women of color as partners and mothers to their children, often before or even after their marriages to white women. French Louisiana also included communities of Swiss and German settlers; however, royal authorities did not refer to "Louisianans" but described the colonial population as "French" citizens.

==== Indians in French Louisiana ====
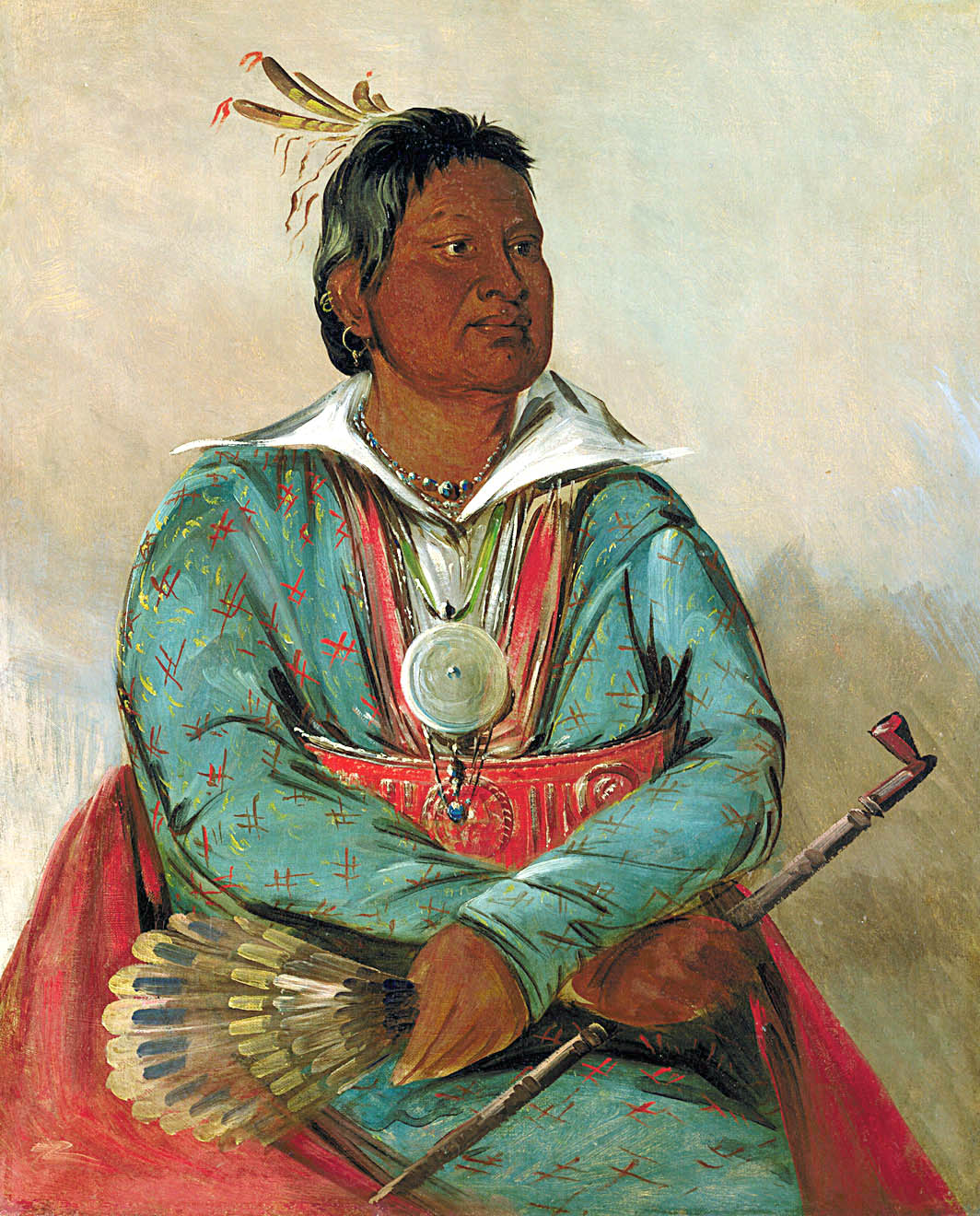
A Choctaw chief

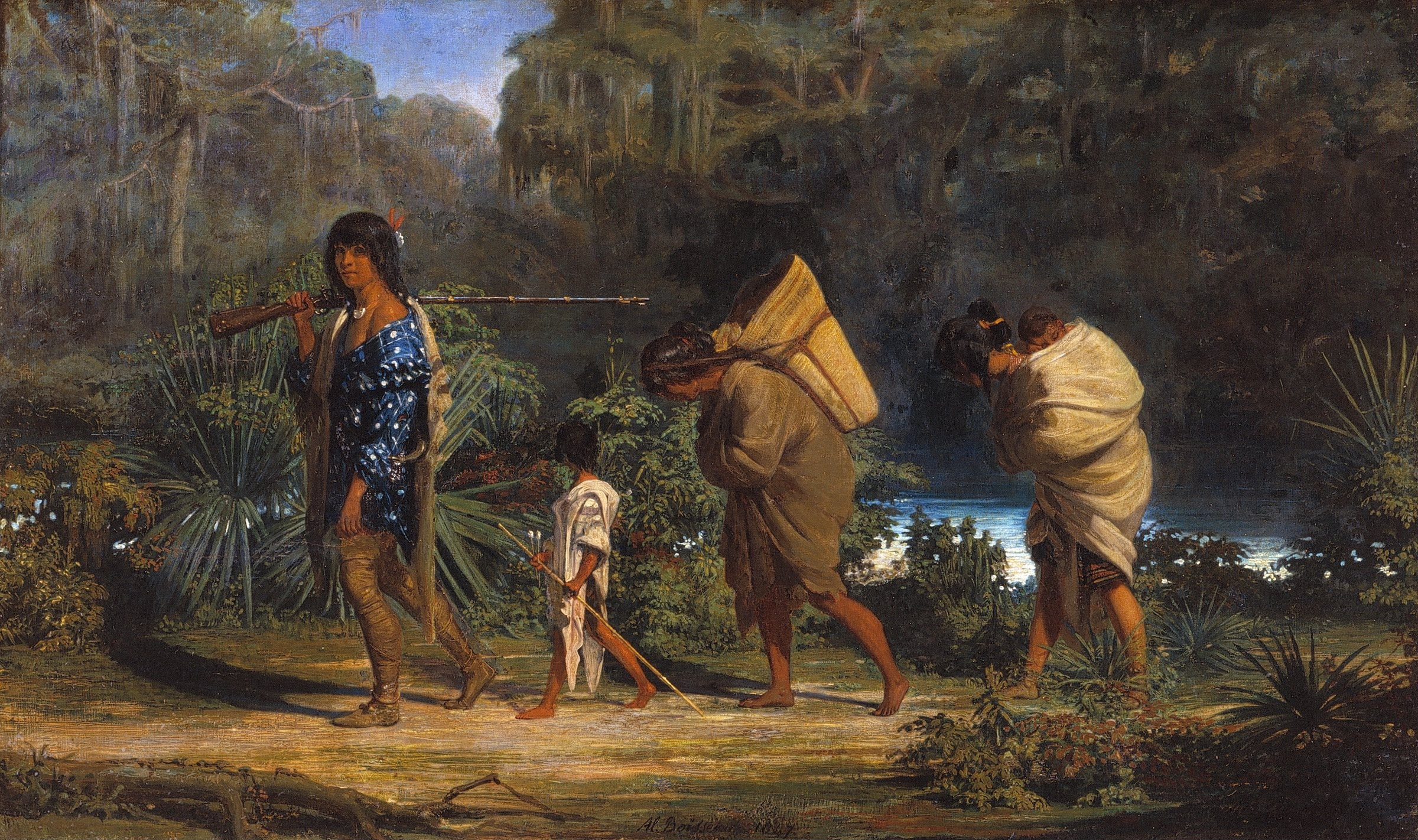
Louisiana Indians walking along a bayou (Alfred Boisseau, 1847)

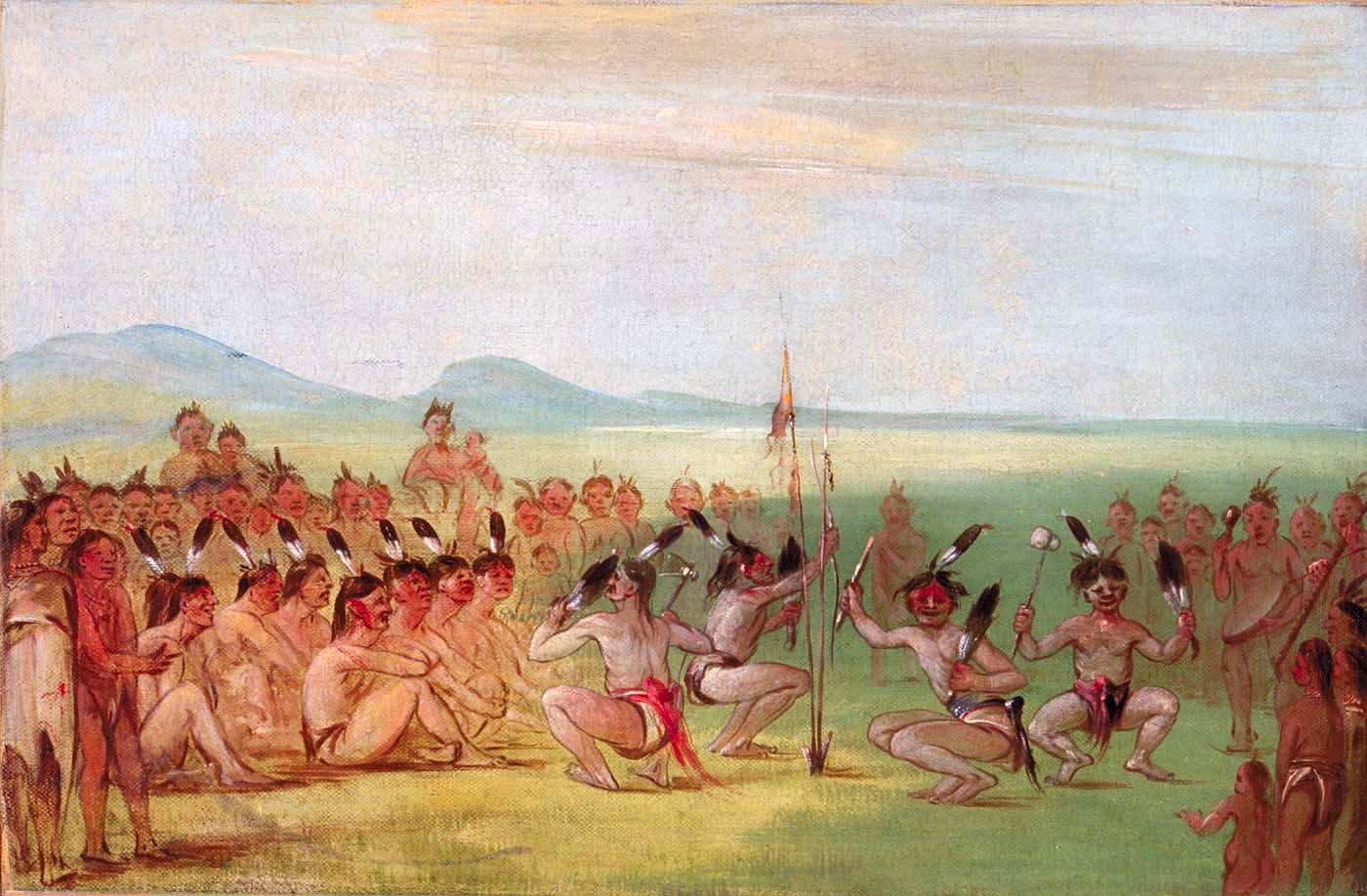
A Choctaw Eagle dance

New France wished to make Native Americans subjects of the king and good Christians, but the distance from Metropolitan France and the sparseness of French settlement intervened. In official rhetoric, the Native Americans were regarded as subjects of the Viceroyalty of New France, but in reality, they were largely autonomous due to their numerical superiority. The colonial authorities (governors, officers) did not have the human resources to establish French law and customs, and instead often compromised with the locals.

Indian tribes offered essential support for the French: they ensured the survival of New France's colonists, participated with them in the fur trade, and acted as expedition guides.

The French/Indian alliance provided mutual protection from hostile non-allied tribes and incursions on French and Indian land from enemy European powers. The alliance proved invaluable during the later French and Indian War against the New England colonies in 1753.

The French and Indians influenced each other in many areas. The French settlers learned the languages of the Natives, such as Mobilian Jargon, which was a Muscogee-based pidgin or trade language closely connected to western Muscogean languages like Choctaw and Chickasaw. This language served as a lingua franca among the French and Indian tribes in the region. The Indians bought European goods (fabric, alcohol, firearms, etc.), learned French, and sometimes adopted their religion.

The coureurs des bois and soldiers borrowed canoes and moccasins. Many ate native food, such as wild rice, bears, and dogs. The colonists were often dependent on Native Americans for food. Creole cuisine is the heir of these mutual influences: thus, sagamité, for example, is a mix of corn pulp, bear fat, and bacon. Today "jambalaya" refers to a number of different of recipes calling for spicy meat and rice. Sometimes medicine men succeeded in curing colonists thanks to traditional remedies, such as the application of fir tree gum on wounds and Royal Fern on rattlesnake bites.

Many French colonists both admired and feared the Indigenous peoples' military power. At the same time, some French governors looked down on their culture and sought to keep a clear divide between the white settlers and Indians. In 1735, interracial marriages were prohibited in Louisiana without the authorities' approval. However, by the 1750s in New France, the Native Americans came under the myth of the Noble Savage, holding that Indians were spiritually pure and played an important role in the New World's natural purity. Indian women were consistently considered to be good wives to foster trade and help create offspring. Their intermarriage created a large métis (mixed French Indian) population.

In spite of disagreements (some Indians killed farmers' pigs, which devastated corn fields) and sometimes violent confrontations (Fox Wars, Natchez uprisings, and Chickasaw Wars), the relationship with Native Americans was relatively good in Louisiana. French imperialism was expressed through wars and the enslavement of some Native Americans. But most of the time, the relationship was based on dialogue and negotiation.

==== Africans in Louisiana ====
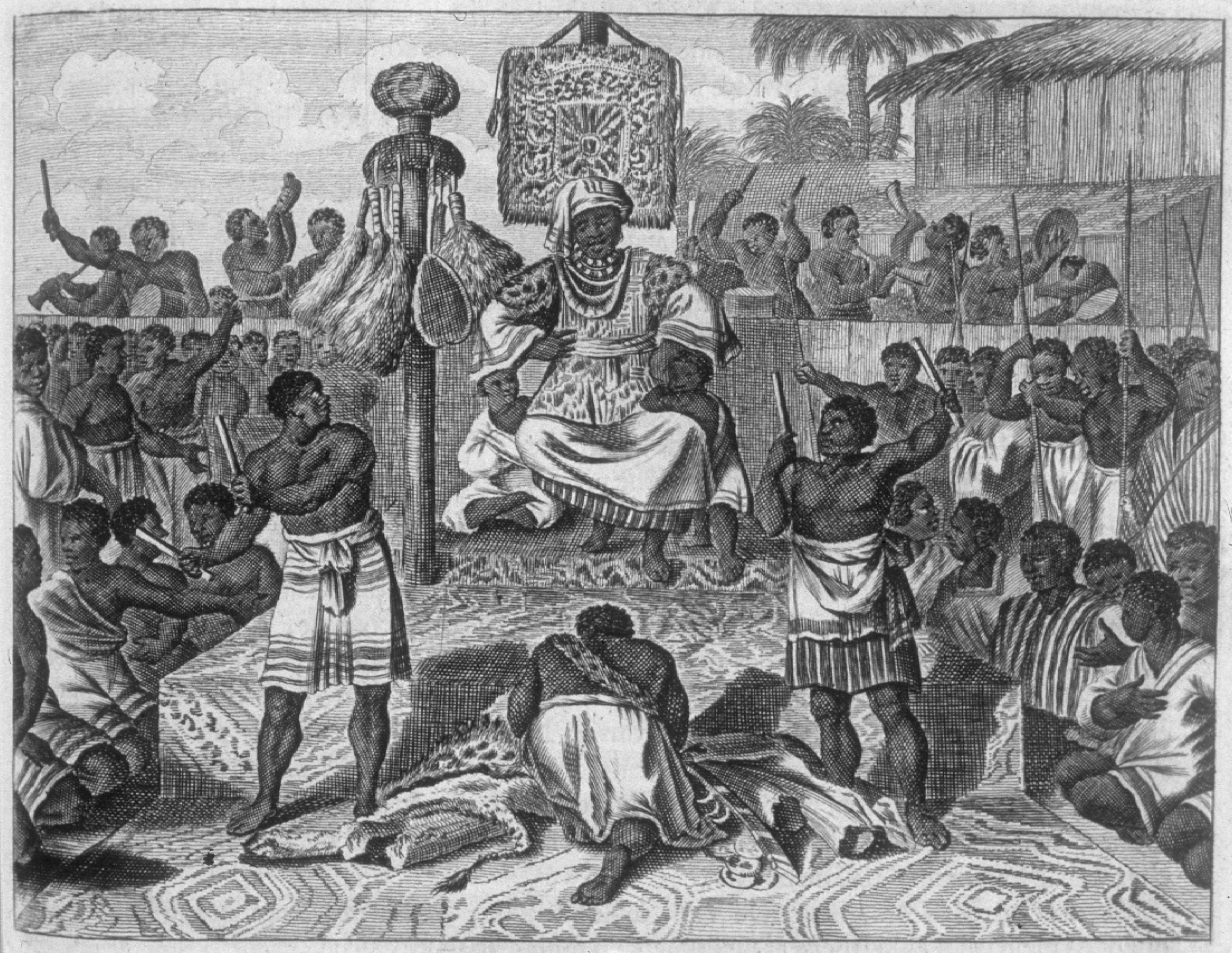
Trumpeters appear in a seventeenth-century depiction of the court of the King of Loango, a Kongo kingdom, 1686

Labor shortages were the most pressing issue in Louisiana. In 1717, John Law, the French Comptroller General of Finances, decided to import African slaves there. His objective was to develop the plantation economy of Lower Louisiana. The Royal Indies Company held a monopoly over the slave trade in the area. The colonists turned to sub-Saharan African slaves. The biggest year was 1716, in which several trading ships appeared with slaves in a one-year span.

During the French period about two-thirds of the enslaved Africans brought to Louisiana came from the area that is now Senegambia (which are the modern states of Senegal, Gambia, Mali, and Guinea, Guinea Bissau and Mauritania). This original population creolized, mixing their African cultures with elements of the French and Spanish colonial society and quickly establishing a Creole culture that influenced every aspect of the new colony.

Most enslaved Africans imported to Louisiana were from modern-day Angola, Congo, Mali, and Senegal. The highest number were of Bakongo and Mbundu descent from Congo and Angola, representing 35.4% of all people with African heritage in Louisiana. They were followed by the Mandinka people at 10.9% and Mina (believed to represent the Ewe and Akan peoples of Ghana) at 7.4%. Other ethnic groups imported during this period included members of the Bambara, Wolof, Igbo people, Chamba people, Bamileke, Tikar, and Nago people, a Yoruba subgroup.

===== Ambundu and Kongo ancestry =====
Musicians in the Kingdom of Kongo (ca 1670s), Central Africa

While about two-thirds of enslaved Africans brought to Louisiana during French period were from the Senegambian region, the majority of enslaved Africans brought to Louisiana were from present-day Angola. The term Congo became synonymous with "African" in Louisiana because many enslaved Africans came from the Congo Basin. Renowned for their work as agriculturalists, the Bakongo and Mbundu peoples of the Kingdom of Kongo, Kingdom of Ndongo, and the Kingdom of Loango were preferred by slave traders for their slash-and-burn technique, mining and ironwork expertise, mastery of fishing, and their bushcraft skills.

Elements of Kongo and Mbundu culture survive in Louisiana. Congo Square, a historic place where the enslaved Africans would set up a market, sing, worship, dance, and play music, it was named after the Kongo people, it's the birthplace of jazz music. Today, Hoodoo and Louisiana Voodoo practitioners still gather at the Square for rituals and to honor their ancestors.

===== Bambara ancestry =====
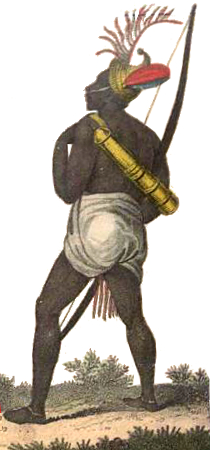
A Bambara warrior of West Africa (modern-day Mali)

The African Bambara Empire was known for capturing slaves by raiding neighboring regions and forcibly assimilating young men into slave soldiers, known as Ton. The empire relied on captives to replenish and increase its numbers.

By 1719, the French began to import African slaves into Louisiana from Senegal. Most of the people living in the Senegambia area, with the exception of the Bambara, were converted to Islam under the Mali and then Songhai Empire. Since Islamic law prohibited Muslim enslavement of other Muslims, the Bambara who resisted religious conversion were highly represented among those sold into slavery. Gwendolyn Hall documents that Africans of Bambara origins predominated among those enslaved in French Louisiana during the American colonial period. The common Mande culture that the Bambara people brought to French Louisiana would later influence the development of the Louisiana Creole culture.

Slave traders sometimes identified their slaves as Bambara in hopes of securing a higher price, as Bambara slaves were stereotyped as more passive.

===== Code Noir and Affranchis =====
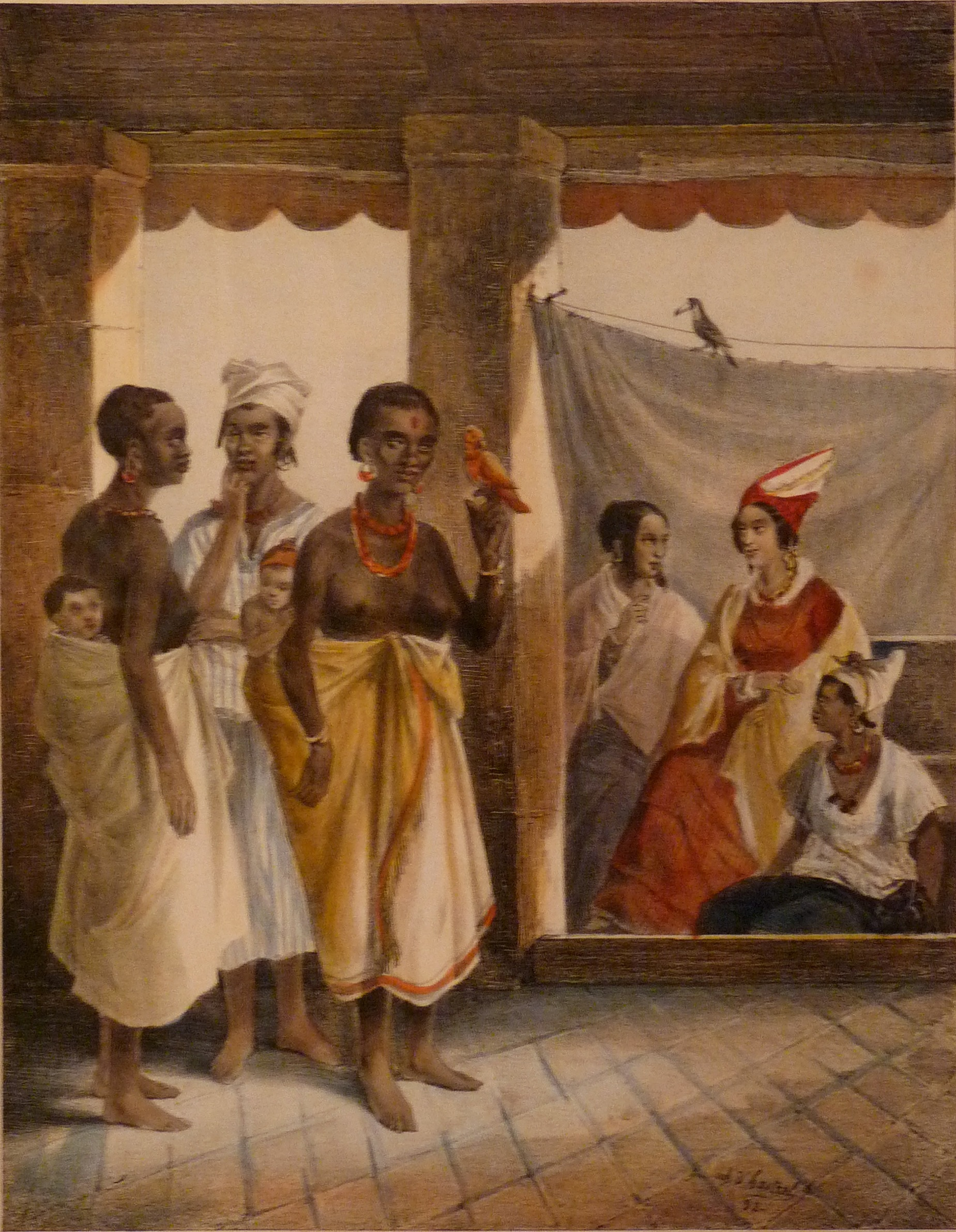
Africans contributed greatly to the creolization of Louisiana.

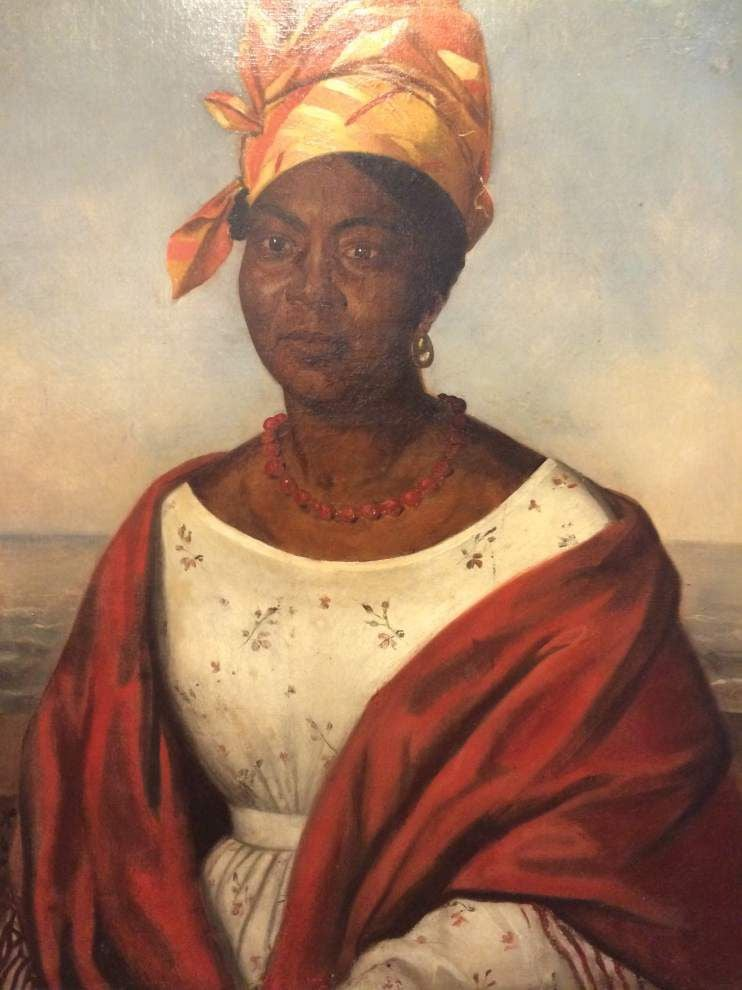
Creole lady wearing a traditional tignon

The French slavery law, Code Noir, required that slaves receive baptism and Christian education, although many continued to practice animism and often combined the two faiths.

The Code Noir conferred affranchis (ex-slaves) full citizenship and complete civil equality with other French subjects.

Louisiana slave society generated its own Afro-Creole culture that affected religious beliefs and Louisiana Creole. The slaves brought with them their cultural practices, languages, and religious beliefs rooted in spirit and ancestor worship, as well as Catholic Christianity—all of which were key elements of Louisiana Voodoo. In the early 1800s, many Creoles from Saint-Domingue also settled in Louisiana, both free people of color and slaves, following the Haitian Revolution on Saint-Domingue, contributing to the state's Voodoo tradition.

=== Spanish period ===
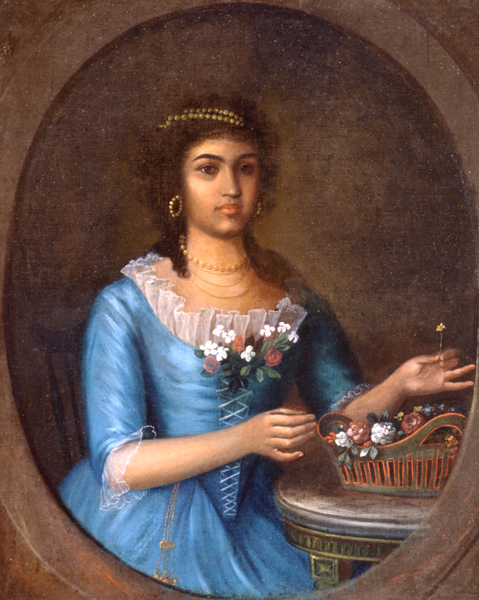
Marianne Celeste Dragon, c. 1795, wealthy Creole from Spanish Louisiana.

In the final stages of the French and Indian War with the British colonies, New France ceded Louisiana to Spain in the secret Treaty of Fontainebleau (1762). The Spanish were reluctant to occupy the colony, however, and did not do so until 1769. That year, Spain abolished Native American slavery. In addition, Spanish liberal manumission policies contributed to the population growth of Creoles of color, particularly in New Orleans. Nearly all of the surviving 18th-century architecture of the Vieux Carré (French Quarter) dates from the Spanish period (the Ursuline Convent is an exception). These buildings were designed by French architects, as no Spanish architects had come to Louisiana.

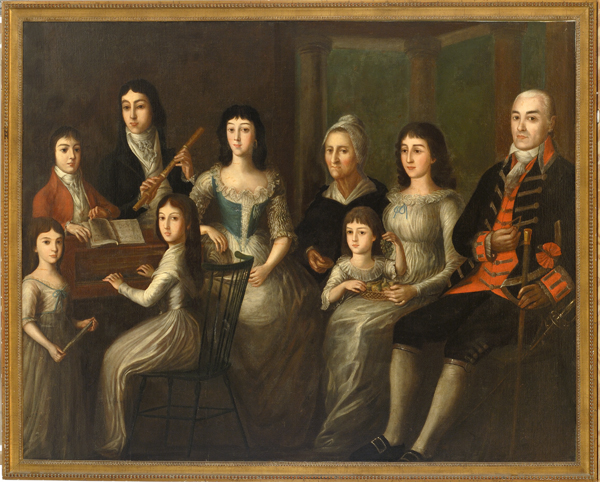
Spanish Creole family portrait in 1790 in New Orleans, Spanish Louisiana.

Spanish Louisiana's Creole descendants, who included affranchis (ex-slaves), free-born blacks, and mixed-race people, known as Creoles of color (gens de couleur libres), were influenced by French Catholic culture. By the end of the 18th century, many Creoles of color were educated and worked in artisanal or skilled trades; many were property owners. Many Creoles of color were free-born, and their descendants enjoyed many of the same privileges as whites while under Spanish rule, including property ownership, formal education, and service in the militia. Indeed, Creoles of color had been members of the militia for decades under both French and Spanish control. For example, around 80 Creoles of color were recruited into the militia that participated in the Battle of Baton Rouge in 1779.

Throughout the Spanish period, most Creoles continued to speak French and remained connected to French colonial culture. However, the sizeable Spanish Creole communities of Saint Bernard Parish and Galveztown spoke Spanish. The Malagueños of New Iberia spoke Spanish as well. (Since the mid-20th century, the number of Spanish-speaking Creoles declined in favor of English speakers. Even today, however, the Isleños of St. Bernard Parish maintained cultural traditions from the Canary Islands.)

==== Acadians and Isleños in Louisiana ====
A map of Acadiana, the Cajun Country.

In 1765, during Spanish rule, several thousand Acadians from the French colony of Acadia (now Nova Scotia, New Brunswick, and Prince Edward Island) made their way to Louisiana after they were expelled from Acadia by the British government after the French and Indian War. They settled chiefly in the southwestern Louisiana region now called Acadiana. The governor Luis de Unzaga y Amézaga, eager to gain more settlers, welcomed the Acadians, who became the ancestors of Louisiana's Cajuns.

Spanish Canary Islanders, called Isleños, emigrated from the Canary Islands to Louisiana 1778 and 1783. In 1800, France's Napoleon Bonaparte reacquired Louisiana from Spain in the Treaty of San Ildefonso, an arrangement kept secret for two years.

=== 2nd French period, the Sale of Louisiana ===
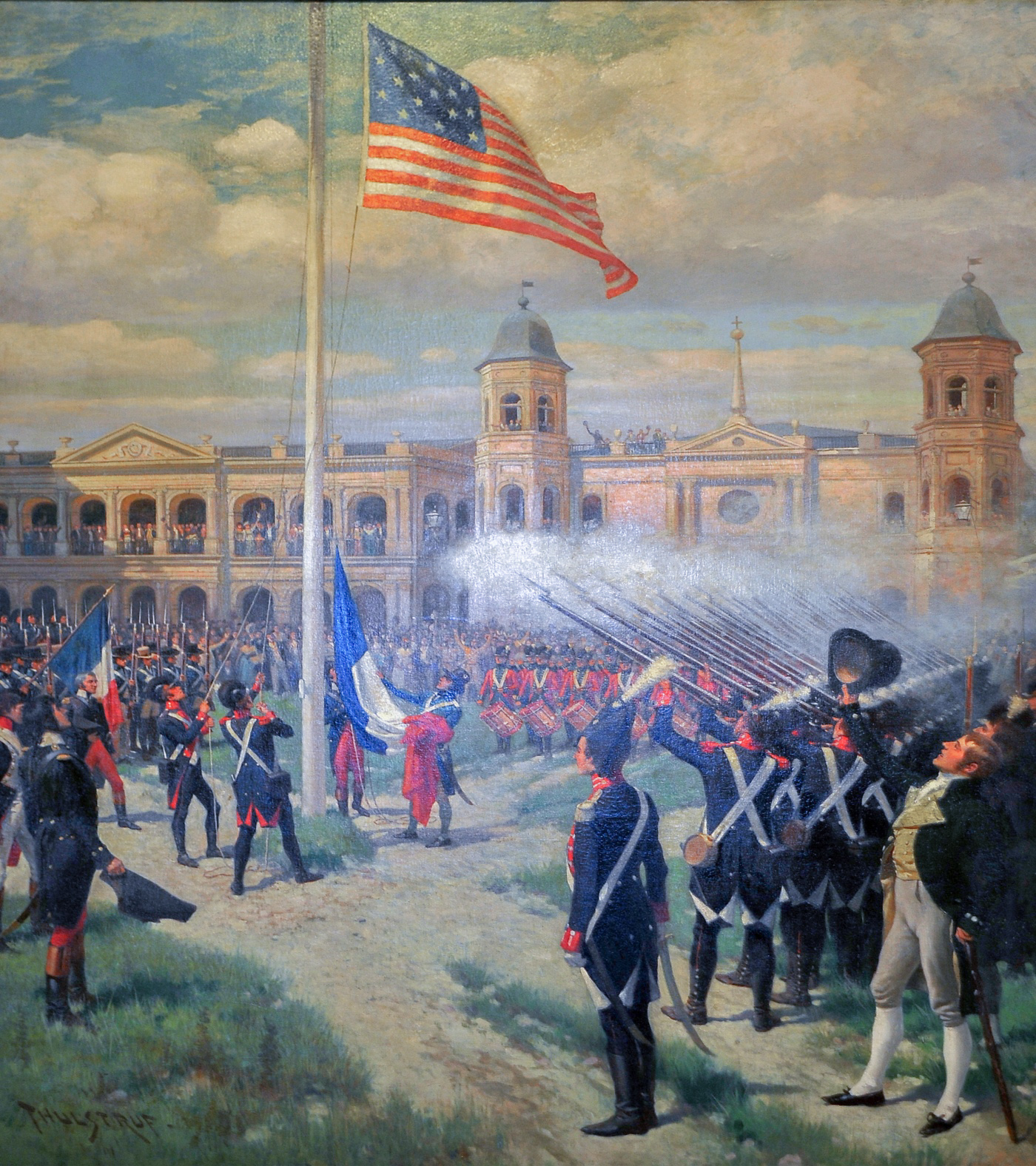
The French flag is removed and the American flag is hoisted in New Orleans after the Louisiana Purchase.

Spain ceded Louisiana back to France in 1800 through the Third Treaty of San Ildefonso, although it remained under nominal Spanish control until 1803. Weeks after reasserting control over the territory, Napoleon sold Louisiana to the United States in the wake of the defeat of his forces in Saint-Domingue. Napoleon had been trying to regain control of Saint-Domingue following its rebellion and subsequent Haitian Revolution. After the sale, many Anglo-Americans migrated to Louisiana. Later European immigrants included Irish, Germans, and Italians.

==== Refugees from Saint-Domingue in Louisiana ====
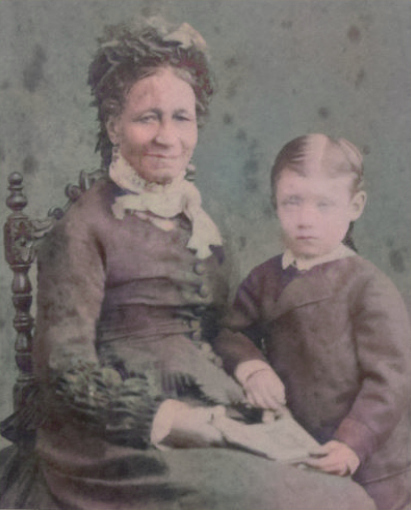
Saint-Domingue Creole Elisabeth Dieudonné Vincent with her granddaughter. Vincent fled to New Orleans, Louisiana with her parents as a child.

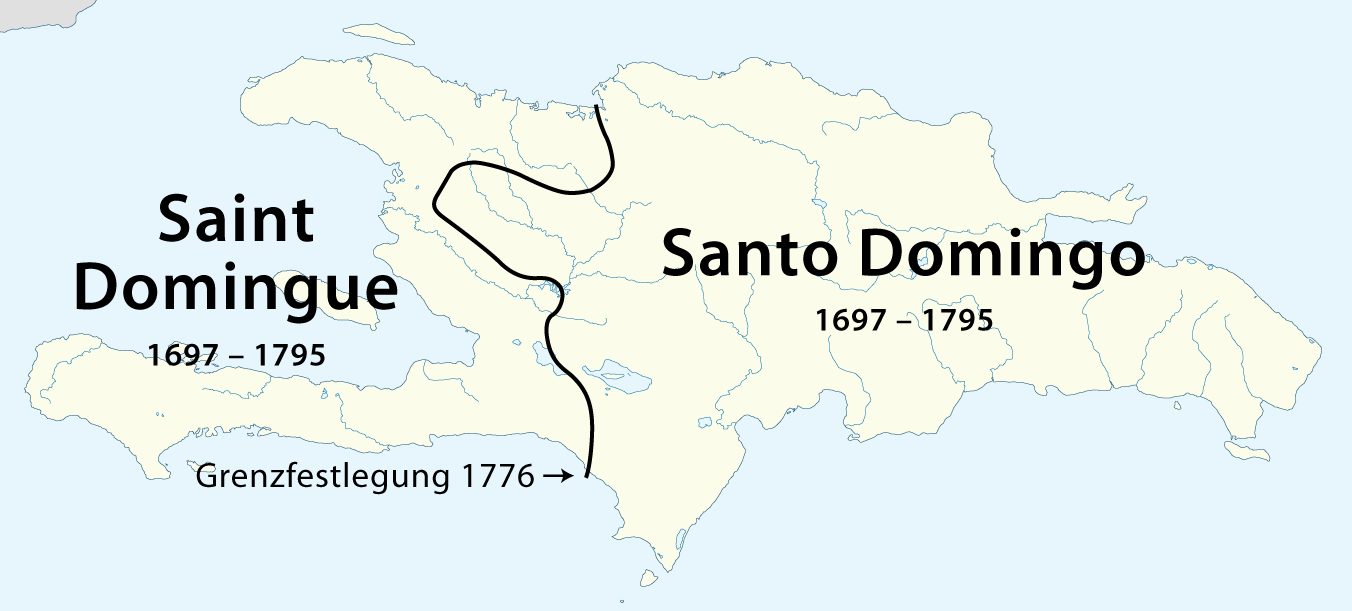
A map of Saint-Domingue.

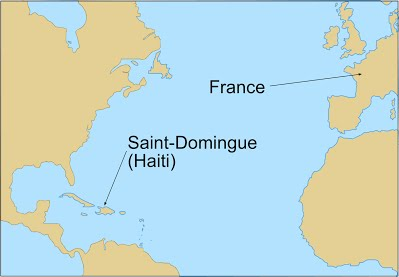
The distance between Saint-Domingue and France

In the early 19th century, floods of Creole refugees fled Saint-Domingue and poured into New Orleans with more than half of the refugee population of Saint-Domingue settling in Louisiana. Thousands of refugees, both white and Creole of color, arrived in New Orleans, sometimes bringing slaves with them. While Governor Claiborne and other Anglo-American officials wanted to keep out additional free black men, Louisiana Creoles wanted to increase the French-speaking Creole population. As more refugees entered, those who had first gone to Cuba also arrived. Officials in Cuba deported many of these refugees in retaliation for Bonapartist schemes in Spain.

In the summer of 1809, a fleet of ships from the Spanish colony of Cuba landed in New Orleans with more than 9,000 refugees from Saint-Domingue aboard, having been expelled by the island's governor, Marqués de Someruelos. These immigrants nearly doubled the population of New Orleans, and renewed its Francophone character. Altogether, more than 10,000 refugees, consisting of whites, free people of color, and slaves in almost equal numbers, fled to the city in a period of about six months, 90 percent of them remaining in the city. The city's population was now 63 percent black. Historians generally have written that the 1809 deportation from Cuba of former residents of Saint-Domingue brought 2,731 whites, 3,102 Creoles of color and 3,226 slaves, although a decree in 1793 had abolished slavery in Saint-Domingue, and in 1794 abolition had been ratified by the French National Convention.

The Saint-Domingue Creole specialized population raised Louisiana's level of culture and industry, and was one of the reasons why Louisiana was able to gain statehood so quickly. A quote from a Louisiana Creole who remarked on the rapid development of his homeland:

"Nobody knows better than you just how little education the Louisianians of my generation have received and how little opportunity one had twenty years ago to procure teachers... Louisiana today offers almost as many resources as any other state in the American Union for the education of its youth. The misfortunes of the French Revolution have cast upon this country so many talented men. This factor has also produced a considerable increase in the population and wealth. The evacuation of Saint-Domingue and lately that of the island of Cuba, coupled with the immigration of the people from the East Coast, have tripled in eight years the population of this rich colony, which has been elevated to the status of statehood by virtue of a governmental decree."

===== Saint-Domingue Creole controversy =====
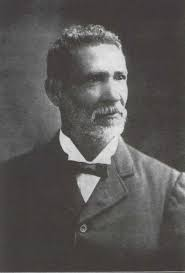
New Orleans Creole journalist Rodolphe Desdunes

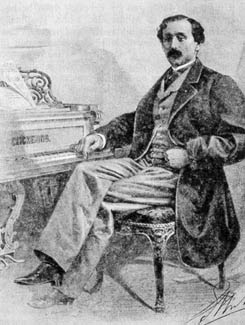
Classical Composer Louis Moreau Gottschalk

American authorities initially forbade access of slaves into Louisiana. However, some concessions were made to fleeing refugees, especially after the 1804 Haiti Massacre. In 1804, Jean-Jacques Dessalines decreed that all Creoles of color and freed slaves deemed traitors to the Haitian Empire should be put to death. He ordered that all whites in Haiti should also be exterminated, with few exceptions. The refugees had many slaves who came willingly as they feared the bloodshed, murder, pillaging, lawlessness, and economic collapse in the Haiti. Here is a letter from a fleeing refugee about his petition for asylum to the American government on behalf of his servants in Saint-Domingue:

I find myself with my wife six months pregnant, feeding a son not yet eight months old; my brother is more fortunate than I, for he is without his wife and his child who were compelled by poor health to remain temporarily at Saint-Domingue. We were constrained to abandon our possessions and our servants, who have shown us fidelity and attachment, which did not permit us at the last minute to hide from them our route and plans. 'What is going to become of us,' these poor unfortunates said to us, 'if you abandon us in this lost and ruined country? Take us with you, any place you want to go; we will follow you anywhere. As long as we die with you, we will be happy.' Moved by this speech that each of them expressed in his own way, and all in a manner that appeared natural to us, how could we have concealed from them the uncertainty clouding the attempt which we, acting out of gratitude, must make to bring them to Louisiana. We could only promise to request permission.

When the refugees arrived with slaves, they often followed the Creole custom, liberté des savanes (savannah liberty), where the owner allowed their slaves to be free to find work at their own convenience in exchange for a flat weekly or monthly rate. They often became domestics, cooks, wigmakers, and coachmen.

Although they remained concentrated in New Orleans, about 10% of them scattered into surrounding parishes. There, manual labor for agriculture was in greatest demand. The scarcity of slaves made Creole planters turn to petits habitants (Creole peasants), and engagés to supply manual labor; they complemented paid labor with slave labor. On many plantations, free people of color and whites toiled side-by-side with slaves. This multi-class state of affairs led many to support the abolition of slavery.

The large, rich families of Saint-Domingue were almost nowhere to be found in Louisiana. Indeed, the majority of Saint-Domingue refugees who made a mark on 19th century Louisiana and Louisiana Creole culture came from the lower classes of Saint-Domingue, such as Louis Moreau Gottschalk's and Rodolphe Desdunes' family.

===== American fears of the Saint-Domingue refugees =====
Anglo-Americans were hostile towards the refugees from Saint-Domingue, identifying them with the Saint-Domingue's Rebellion. Some refugees did attempt to perpetuate French Revolutionary ideas on their arrival into Louisiana.

American fears were eventually confirmed; in 1805, Grandjean, a white Creole from Saint-Domingue, and his compatriot accomplices attempted to incite a slave rebellion aimed at overthrowing the American government in Louisiana. The plan was foiled by a New Orleanian Creole of color who revealed the plot to American authorities. The Americans sentenced Grandjean and his accomplices to work on a chain-gang for the rest of their lives.

==== Rivalry between Louisiana Creoles and Anglo-Americans ====
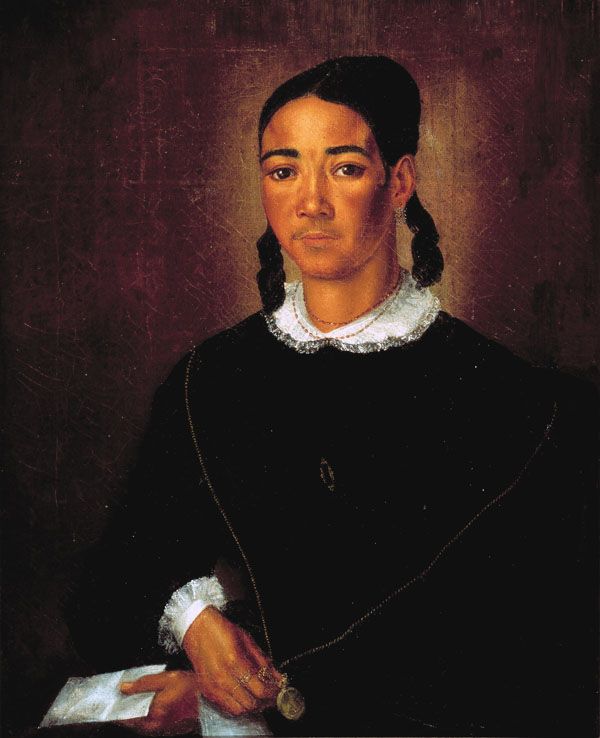
New Orleans Creole lady, 1840s

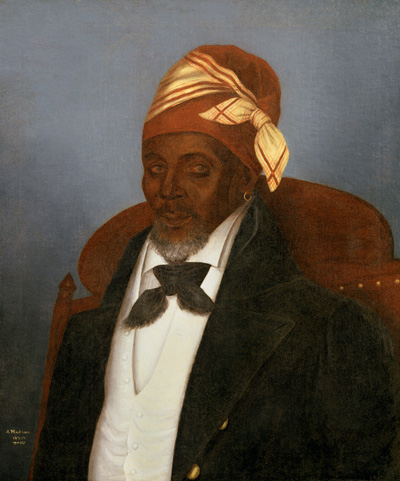
A Creole gentleman of New Orleans with an exquisite Creole turban, 1835

The transfer of the French colony to the United States and the arrival of Anglo Americans from New England and the South created a cultural confrontation. Some Americans were reportedly shocked by aspects of the territory's culture: the predominance of the French language and Roman Catholicism, the class of free Creoles of color and the slaves' African traditions. They pressured the United States' first governor of the Louisiana Territory, W.C.C. Claiborne, to change it.

Anglo-Americans classified society into white and black people (the latter associated strongly with slaves). Since the late 17th century, children in British colonies took the status of their mothers at birth; therefore, children of enslaved mothers were born into slavery, regardless of their father's race or status; many mixed-race slaves were born in the American South.

In the South, free Black people often did not hold the same rights and freedoms as Catholic Creoles of color during French and Spanish rule, including holding office. 353 Creoles of color were recruited into the militia that fought in the Battle of New Orleans in 1812. Some descendants of Creole of color veterans, such as Caesar Antoine, fought in the American Civil War.

When Claiborne made English the territory's official language, the French Creoles of New Orleans were outraged, and reportedly protested in the streets. They rejected the Americans' effort to transform them. Upper-class French Creoles thought that many of the arriving Americans were uncouth, especially the Kentucky boatmen (Kaintucks) who regularly visited, steering flatboats down the Mississippi River filled with goods for market.

Realizing that he needed local support, Claiborne restored French as an official language. In government, public forums, and in the Catholic Church, French continued to be used. Most importantly, Louisiana French and Louisiana Creole remained the languages of the majority of the population, leaving English and Spanish behind.

==== Louisiana Creole exceptionalism ====
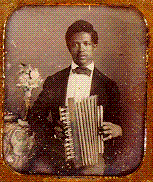
A Creole Accordionist of New Orleans, 1850s

Louisiana's development and growth was rapid after its admission as a state.

By 1850, one-third of all Creoles of color owned over $100,000 worth of property. Creoles of color became wealthy businessmen, entrepreneurs, clothiers, real estate developers, doctors, and other respected professions; they owned estates and properties. Aristocratic Creoles of color became wealthy, such as Aristide Mary who owned more than $1,500,000 of property.

Nearly all boys of wealthy Creole families were sent to France, where they received an excellent classical education.

As a French, and later Spanish colony, Louisiana maintained a society similar to other Latin American and Caribbean countries, split into three tiers: aristocracy, bourgeoisie, and peasantry. The blending of cultures and races created a society unlike any other in America.

== Ethnic blend and race ==
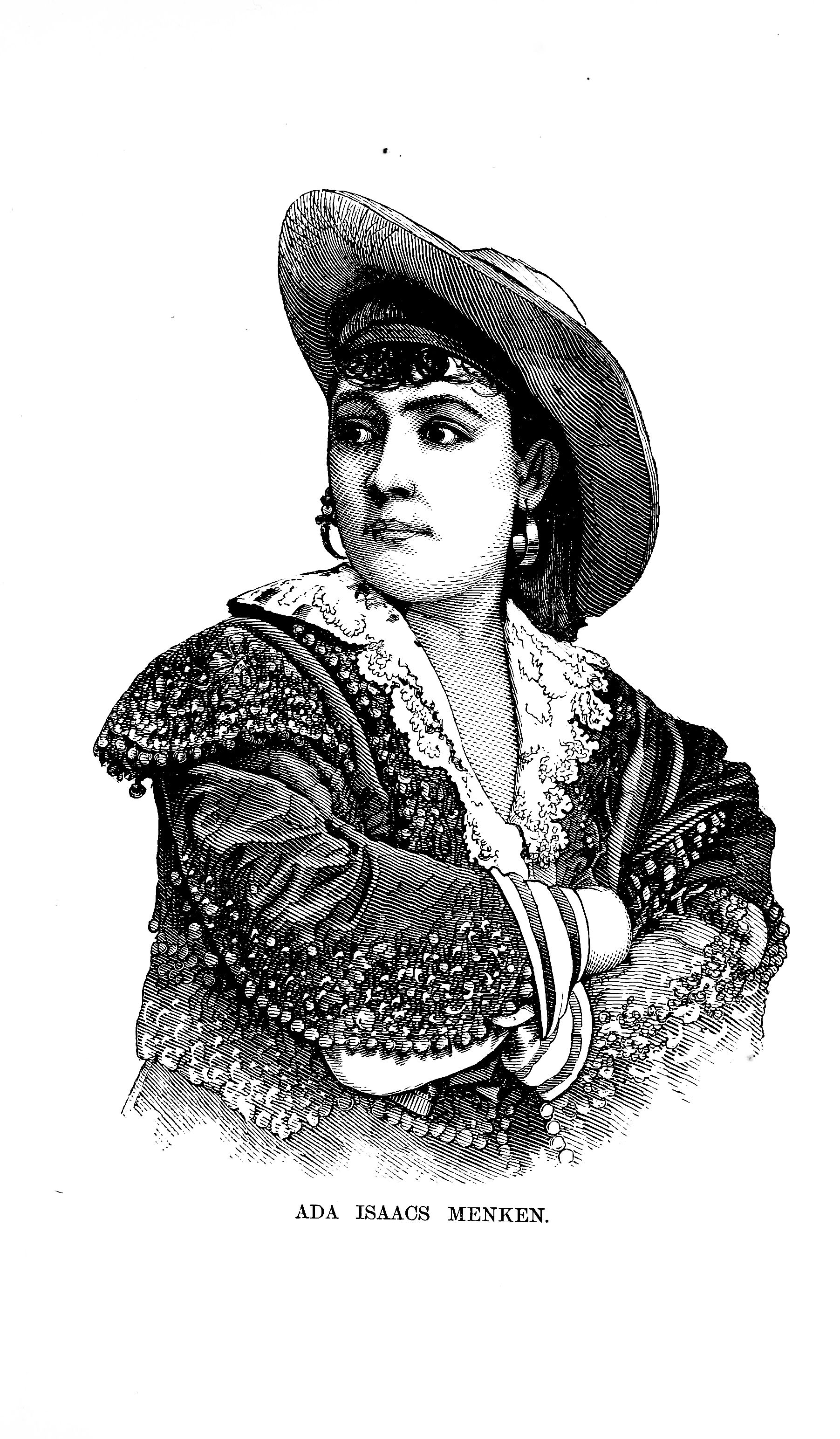
Adah Isaacs Menken, actress, painter and poet, portrayed in 1870

During the Age of Discovery, native-born colonists were referred to as Creoles to distinguish them from the new arrivals of France, Spain, and Africa.

Like "Cajun", the term "Creole" is a popular name used to describe cultures in the Louisiana area. "Creole" can be roughly defined as "native to a region", but its precise meaning varies according to the geographic area in which it is used. Generally, however, Creoles felt the need to distinguish themselves from the influx of American and European immigrants coming into the area after the Louisiana Purchase of 1803. "Creole" is still used to describe the heritage and customs of the various people who settled Louisiana during the early French colonial times. In addition to the French Canadians, the amalgamated Creole culture in southern Louisiana includes influences from the Chitimacha, Houma and other native tribes, Central and West Africans, Spanish-speaking Isleños (Canary Islanders) and French-speaking Gens de couleur from the Caribbean.

There was also a sizable German Creole group of full German descent, which centered on the parishes of St. Charles and St. John the Baptist. (It is for these settlers that the Côte des Allemands, "The German Coast", is named.) Over time, many of these groups assimilated into the dominant francophone Creole culture, often adopting the French language and customs.

As a group, Creoles of color rapidly acquired education, skills (many in New Orleans worked as craftsmen and artisans), businesses and property. They were overwhelmingly Catholic, spoke Colonial French (although some also spoke Louisiana Creole), and maintained French social customs, modified by other parts of their ancestry and Louisiana culture. The Creoles of color often married among themselves to maintain their class and social culture.

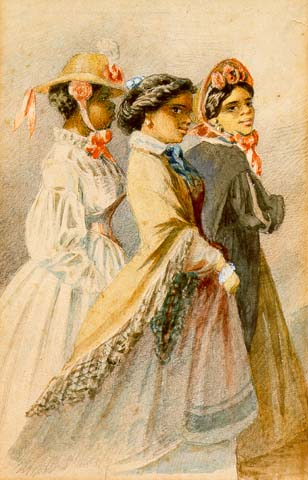
Bourgeois Louisiana Creole girls in fashionable dress, 1867

Under the French and Spanish rulers, Louisiana developed a three-tiered society, similar to that of Saint-Domingue (Haiti), Cuba, Brazil, Saint Lucia, Martinique, Guadeloupe and other Latin colonies. This three-tiered society of multi-racial Creoles of European, African and Native American descent included an elite group of large landowners (grands habitants); a prosperous, educated urban group (bourgeoisie); and the far larger class of indentured servants (engagés), African slaves and Creole peasants (petits habitants).

The status of Creoles of color (Gens de Couleur Libres) was one they guarded carefully. The American Union treated Creoles as a unique people due to the Louisiana Purchase Treaty of April 30, 1803. By law, Creoles of Color enjoyed most of the same rights and privileges as whites. They could and often did challenge the law in court and won cases against whites. They were property owners and created schools for their children.

Race did not play as central a role as it does in Anglo-American culture: oftentimes, race was not a concern, but instead, family standing and wealth were key distinguishing factors in New Orleans and beyond. The Creole civil rights activist Rodolphe Desdunes explained the difference between Creoles and Anglo-Americans, concerning the widespread belief in racialism by the latter, as follows:

The groups (Latin and Anglo New Orleanians) had "two different schools of politics [and differed] radically ... in aspiration and method. One hopes [Latins], and the other doubts [Anglos]. Thus we often perceive that one makes every effort to acquire merits, the other to gain advantages. One aspires to equality, the other to identity. One will forget that he is a Negro to think that he is a man; the other will forget that he is a man to think that he is a Negro."

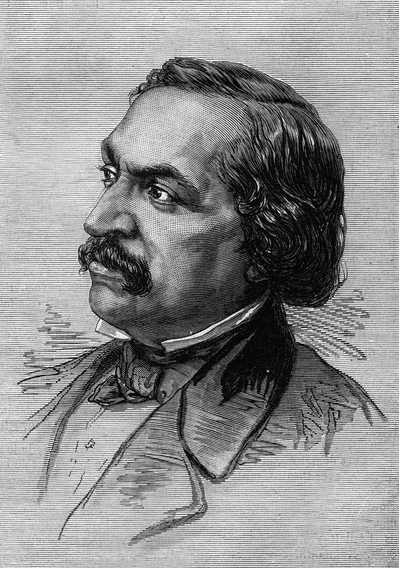
Novelist Victor Séjour

After the United States acquired the area in the Louisiana Purchase, Creoles resisted American attempts to impose their binary racial culture. In other American states, slavery had been a racialized lens through which people with any African descent were considered lower in status than whites; the American binary lens stood contrary to the distinct tri-partite society of Louisiana, including white, black, and multi-racial people.

== Louisiana Creoles during the Civil War ==
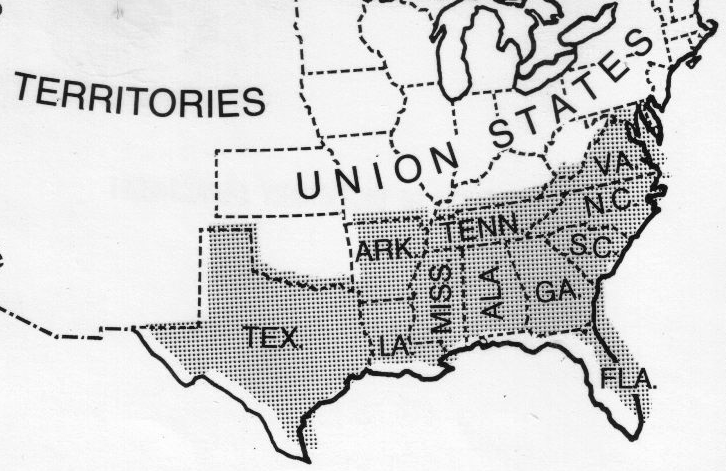
American Civil War map, Federal Union and Southern States

In 1863, two years into the American Civil war, the Federal government decreed the Emancipation Proclamation, promising rights and opportunities for slaves in Southern states. Although the proclamation had no effect in Union-occupied portions of the state, including New Orleans, Creoles of color, who had long been free before the war, worried about losing their identity and social position, as Anglo-Americans did not legally recognize Louisiana's three-tiered society. Nevertheless, Creoles of color such as Thomy Lafon, Victor Séjour and others, used their position to support the emancipation effort. L'Union and the New Orleans Tribune, New Orleans newspapers run by Creoles of color, published work that championed the cause and that advocated for civil rights. One Creole of color, Francis E. Dumas, emancipated his slaves and organized them into a company in the Second Regiment of the Federal Louisiana Native Guards.

Alexander Dimitry, a Creole of New Orleans, was one of the few people of color to take on a leadership role within the Confederate Government. His son, John Bull Smith Dimitry, fought with the Confederate Louisiana Native Guards to defend the Creole State.

=== Invasion of the Creole State ===
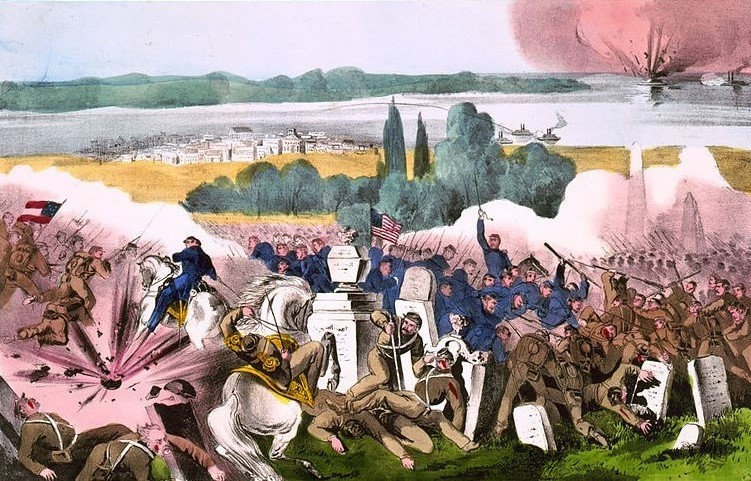
The Battle of Baton Rouge

Republic of Louisiana Flag

During the U.S. invasion of French Louisiana, Federal soldiers came across Creoles of color, a society that they had not encountered while fighting in other Southern states.

After conquering New Iberia in the summer of 1863, U.S. Officer John William Deforest of the 12th Connecticut Infantry Regiment reported:

You would be amazed to see the swarming blacks who possess this region and call themselves Americans. Some of the richest planters, men of really great wealth, are black. When we march through a town the people who gather stare at us and remind me of the Negro quarters of Philadelphia and New York.

The occupation was a social tragedy for Louisiana's Creoles of color; Creoles of color held positions of esteem and respect in French Louisiana, but the invading Federal soldiers soon humiliated and subjected them to racism.

New Iberia's Creole population- men, women, children of all ages, of all classes, including former slaves- were forced to work on Federal projects, digging massive earth fortifications.

A correspondent for the Cincinnati Gazette reported:

"Such a mess I dare say was never before seen. Nice young gentlemen in fancy kids and patent leathers, heavy operator with pocket crammed with 'legal tenders', greedy shylock vending his various wares, and sooty citizens of African descent, in one heterogenous mass, quietly delving in mother earth side by side. Of course, they thought it was a great outrage that citizens should have to work on Yankee fortifications... Fortifications had to be built, and citizens, speculators, 'rounders', shylocks, and negroes did the work, while soldiers stood firm at the picket post, ready to shoot down those who attempted to escape."

An Ohio soldier reported: "As you go along the works, you can hear them talking away in their mixed French lingo, the subject being no doubt their degradation."

=== Federal occupation of French Louisiana ===
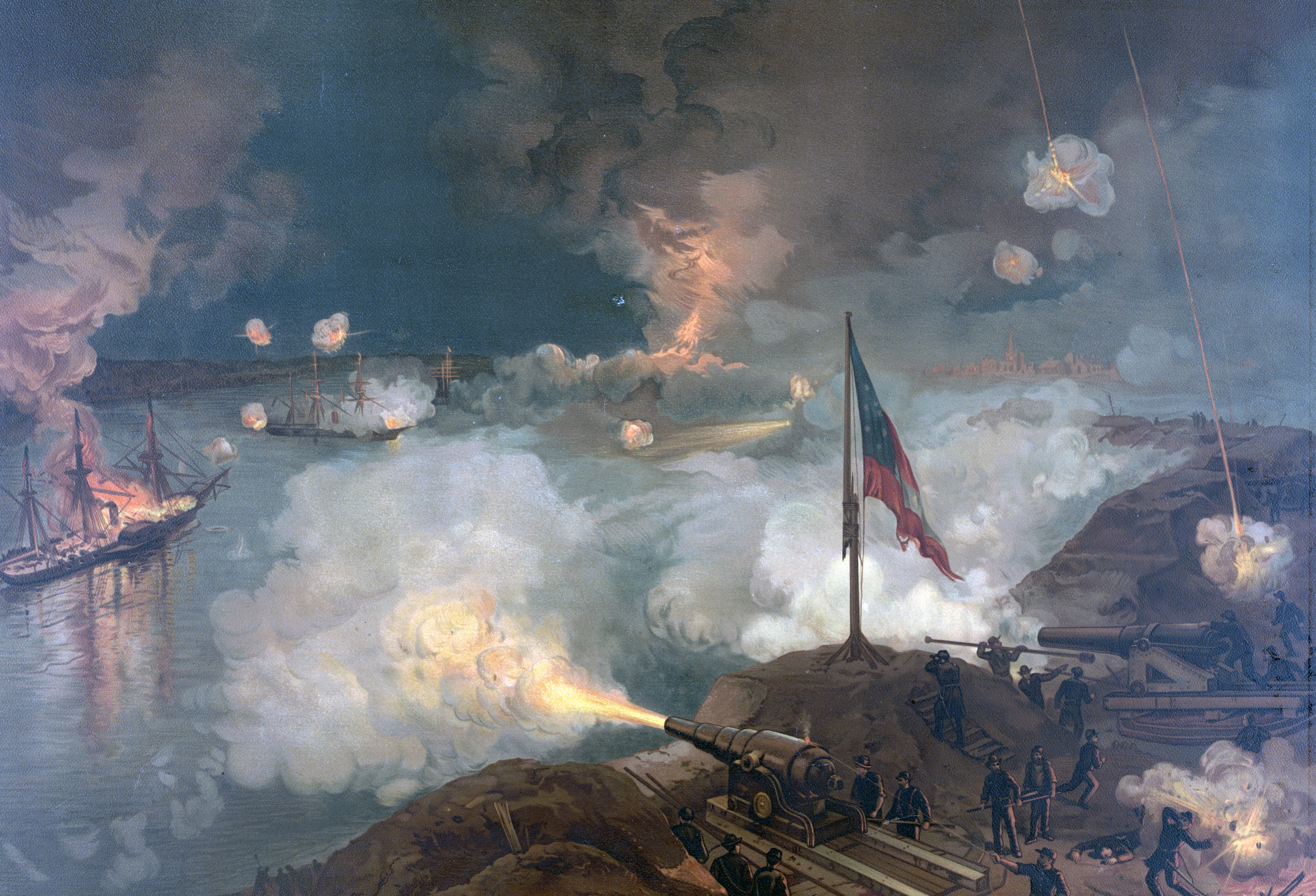
The Siege of Port Hudson

Flag of the Creole State, French Louisiana

Flag of the Texan Forces in Louisiana

When Federal forces conquered Vermilionville (Lafayette) in fall of 1863, the Creole citizenry embraced them as liberators. Prior to its conquest, Vermilionville had been under Texan military occupation and conscription, which Creoles opposed; many Creoles claimed to be "French neutrals" during the conflict.

The Texan forces included Texas Germans, Tejanos, Texas Creoles. The 23rd Wisconsin Regiment, a Wisconsin German unit, reported trading insults in German with Texas Germans during battle.

An Iowan soldier, speaking about the Creoles of Vermilionville, reported:

A great many people in this section were French, or claimed to be, and when we were marching through, claimed French protection by hanging out French flags. All good enough in their estimation, but a fat rooster or a sheep over which a flag of France floated was just the same as from one carrying rebel colors.

During the occupation, Federal soldiers looted and plundered many Creoles. Jean Baptiste Hébert of Vermilionville recalled:

(Federal soldiers) came to our premises and broke open our store door, and were about to break into a large box inside our store which contained goods and merchandise... We protested against the breaking into our store and the taking of our merchandise. We claimed our French nationality (and) showed them a small French flag, or tri-color, in our store. They tore down the same, threw it on the road and stomped on it, saying "Damn the French flag!"

One time, a Federal cavalry regiment massacred Creoles of St. Martinville. On a Sunday, citizens left church services and gathered at the town square to bask in the sunshine and chat. At this point, they were accustomed to the Federal soldiers' presence, and were comfortable with them. However, without any warning or provocation, Federal soldiers raised their muskets and fired into the crowd, which was filled with men, women, and children. Frightened Creoles ran in all directions; families became separated, mothers shrieked for their children, and many people were trampled in the stampede.

CSA Flag

After only six weeks of Federal occupation, the Texan forces returned and retook Vermilionville, forcing Federal forces to retreat. Creoles of Vermilionville flew the CSA flag from every rooftop, and greeted the Texans as heroes; a band even played the "Texas Rangers" song.

=== Retreat of the Texans ===
In winter of 1863, the Texans retreated to protect Galveston and Houston in Texas, abandoning French Louisiana to Federal forces.

Just like the Texans earlier, Federal forces began conscripting Creoles to fight in the war. Attempting to circumvent conscription, some Creoles formed "jayhawker" raider bands, refusing to fight on either Confederate or Federal sides, and surviving off of the land through raiding. For the final two years of the conflict, violent jayhawker raids plagued French Louisiana, leaving widespread destruction and poverty in their wake.

Federal Flag

The most infamous Creole raider band, Bois Mallet, was formed by Ozémé Carrière and his relative Martin Guillory, a prominent Creole of color from St. Landry Parish; Guillory acted as Carrière's chief lieutenant. In 1865 Carrière was killed in battle, leaving Guillory in charge. Guillory later accepted a Federal commission as captain, organizing his raider band into the U.S. Mallet Free Scouts before the end of the war.

At this point, Louisiana was completely devastated, and its inhabitants were left with meager resources and misery. The Federal invasion and occupation of Louisiana negatively impacted Louisiana society, especially for Creoles. Prior to the war, neighbors and friends conversed openly and freely, able to disagree without being disagreeable. Afterwards, an ugly tone of hate, ostracism and hostilities set neighbor against neighbor, relative against relative, white against black, friend against friend. The Federal occupation of Louisiana left societal scars and trauma, many that remain even today.

== Louisiana Creoles after the Civil War ==
Following the Union victory in the Civil War, the Louisiana three-tiered society was gradually overrun by more Anglo-Americans, who classified everyone by the South's binary division of "black" and "white". During the Reconstruction era, Democrats regained power in the Louisiana state legislature by using paramilitary groups like the White League to suppress black voting. The Democrats enforced white supremacy and racial segregation by passing Jim Crow laws and a constitution in 1898 that effectively disenfranchised most black people and Creoles of color through discriminatory application of voter registration and electoral laws.

=== Louisiana Unification Movement, 1873 ===
Louisiana Pelican Flag

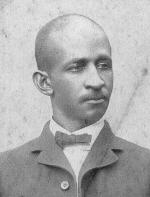
Louisiana Creole lieutenant governor, Caesar Antoine

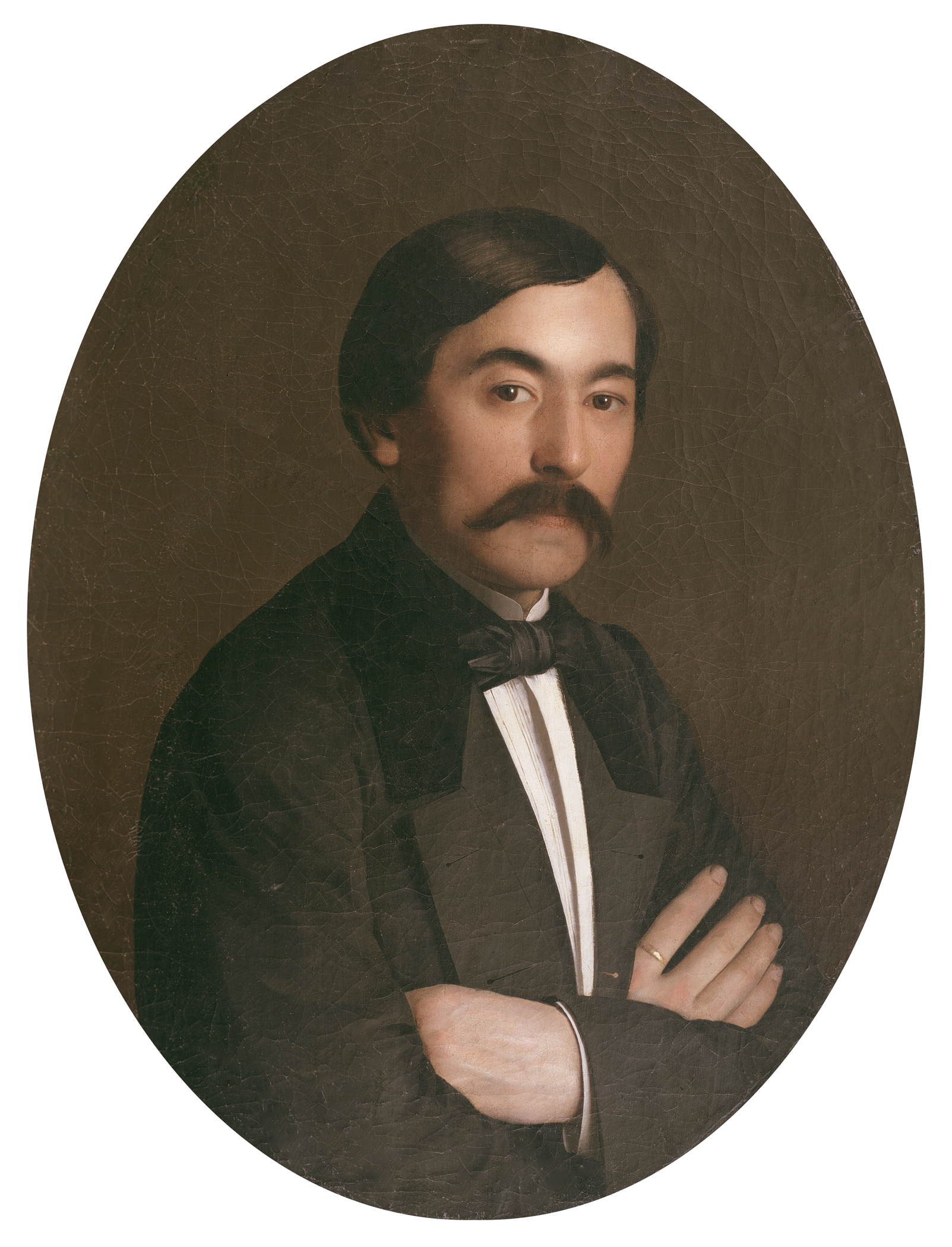
Pierre Gustave Toutant-Beauregard

Some Creoles, such as the ex-Confederate general Pierre Gustave Toutant-Beauregard, advocated against racism, and became proponents for black civil rights and suffrage, involving themselves in the creation of the Louisiana Unification Movement that called for equal rights for black people, denounced discrimination, and opposed segregation. The chant of the Unification movement was "Equal Rights! One Flag! One Country! One People!"

Beauregard approached Lieutenant Governor Caesar Antoine, who was a Creole Republican, and invited fifty leading white and fifty black New Orleanian families to join for a meeting on June 16, 1873. The fifty white sponsors were leaders of the community in business, legal and journalistic affairs, and the presidents of almost every corporation and bank in the city attended. The black sponsors were the wealthy, cultured Creoles of color, who were well-off and had been free before the war. Beauregard was the chairman of the resolutions committee; he advocated at the meeting:

"I am persuaded that the natural relation between the white and colored people is that of friendship, I am persuaded that their interests are identical; that their destinies in this state, where the two races are equally divided are linked together, and that there is no prosperity in Louisiana that must not be the result of their cooperation. I am equally convinced that the evils anticipated by some men from the practical enforcement of equal rights are mostly imaginary, and that the relation of the races in the exercise of these rights will speedily adjust themselves to the satisfaction of all."

The Louisiana Unification Movement advocated complete political equality for blacks, an equal division of state offices between the races, and a plan where blacks would become land owners. It denounced discrimination because of color in hiring laborers or in selecting directors of corporations, and called for the abandonment of segregation in public conveyances, public places, railroads, steams, and public schools." Beauregard argued that blacks "already had equality and the whites had to accept that hard fact".

=== Federally imposed segregation, 1896 ===
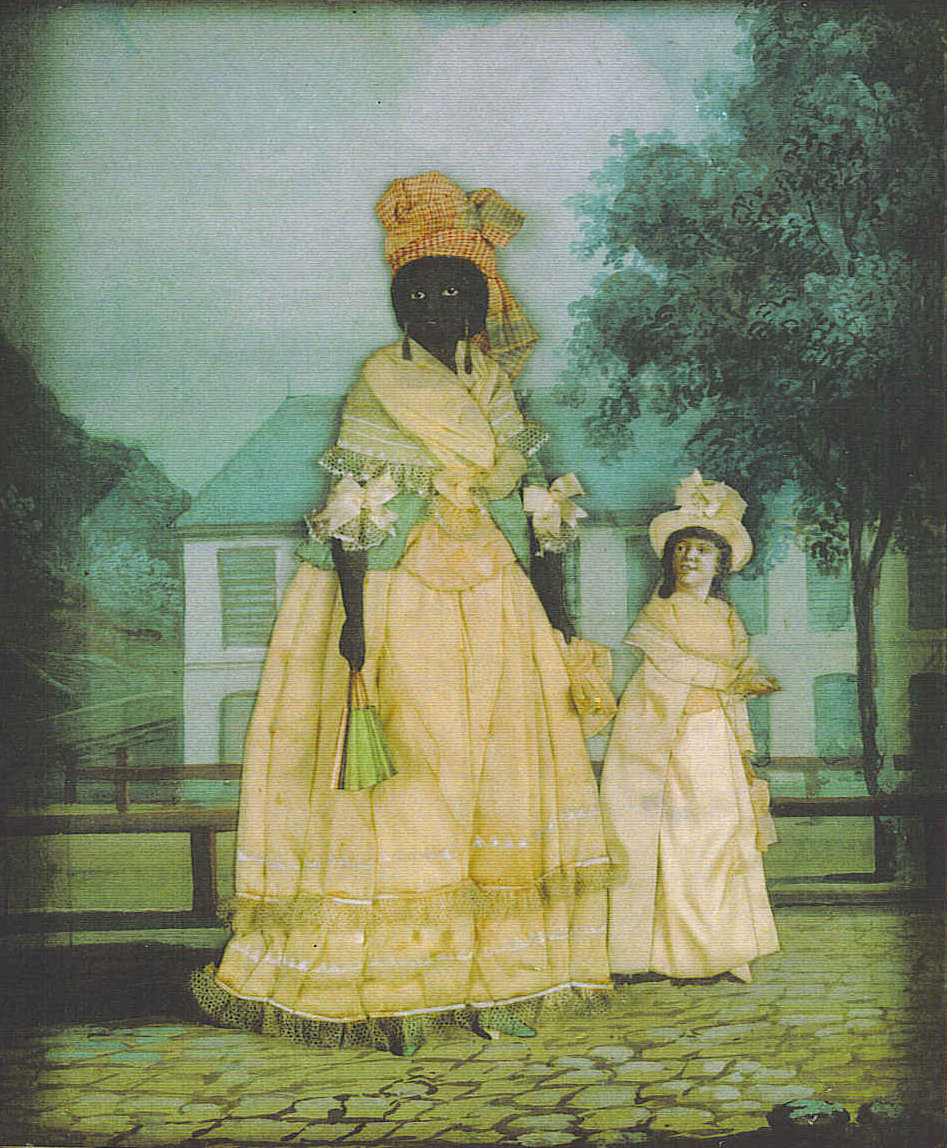
A New Orleans Creole lady accompanied by her daughter

Creoles of color had a unique legacy in regards to race; Creoles had lived in racially integrated neighborhoods for almost two centuries. They valued the colorblind inclusion of New Orleans, and thrived within its historic intracommunity privileges. Creoles of Louisiana fought the rising tide of racism in the 1890s with a distinct outlook and a strong belief in the value of an integrated society.

In 1896, Homère Plessy of New Orleans and other Creole activists came together to challenge the informal practices of racial separation that were plaguing Louisiana, such as the Separate Car Act passed by state legislation, which required separate accommodations for blacks and whites on Louisiana railroads. Their efforts resulted in the case of Plessy v. Ferguson.

The U.S. Supreme Court made a ruling on the case of Plessy v. Ferguson, supporting the legalization of a binary, racially separated society by law; thus the Federal government held that states could implement segregation policies with "separate but equal" accommodations.

==== Disintegration of Creole society ====
While Creoles aspired for "liberté, égalité, et fraternité" (freedom, equality, brotherhood), black and white Americans instead sought segregation and racial separation. Louisiana Creoles found themseleves caught in the middle of a great mass of white and black people fighting against each other.

To fit in the new racial system, especially after the ruling of Plessy v. Ferguson, some Creoles were forced into a position where they had to distance themselves from their black and multiracial cousins; they deliberately erased or destroyed public records, and many "passed over" fully into a white American identity. Increasingly influenced by white American society, some Creoles claimed that the term "Creole" applied to whites only. According to Virginia R. Domínguez:

Charles Gayarré ... and Alcée Fortier ... led the outspoken though desperate defense of the Creole. As bright as these men clearly were, they still became engulfed in the reclassification process intent on salvaging white Creole status. Their speeches consequently read more like sympathetic eulogies than historical analysis.

A young Creole woman wearing a tignon of her own creation.

Sybil Kein suggests that, because of the white Creoles struggle for redefinition, they were particularly hostile to the exploration by the writer George Washington Cable of the multi-racial Creole society in his stories and novels. She believes that in The Grandissimes, Cable exposed white Creoles' preoccupation with covering up blood connections with Creoles of color. Kein writes:

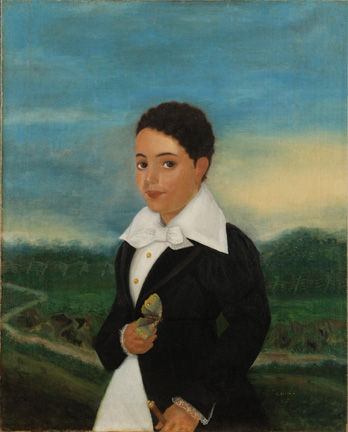
Louisiana Creole boy holding a butterfly

There was a veritable explosion of defenses of Creole ancestry. The more novelist George Washington Cable engaged his characters in family feuds over inheritance, embroiled them in sexual unions with blacks and mulattoes and made them seem particularly defensive about their presumably pure Caucasian ancestry, the more vociferously the white Creoles responded, insisting on purity of white ancestry as a requirement for identification as Creole.

In the 1930s, populist Governor Huey Long satirized such Creole claims, saying that you could feed all the "pure white" people in New Orleans with a cup of beans and a half a cup of rice, and still have food left over! The effort to impose Anglo-American binary racial classification on Creoles continued, however. In 1938, in Sunseri v. Cassagne—the Louisiana Supreme Court proclaimed traceability of African ancestry to be the only requirement for definition of colored. And during her time as Registrar of the Bureau of Vital Statistics for the City of New Orleans (1949–1965), Naomi Drake tried to impose these binary racial classifications. She unilaterally changed records to classify mixed-race individuals as black if she found they had any black (or African) ancestry, an application of hypodescent rules, and did not notify people of her actions.

Among the practices Drake directed was having her workers check obituaries. They were to assess whether the obituary of a person identified as white provided clues that might help show the individual was "really" black, such as having black relatives, services at a traditionally black funeral home, or burial at a traditionally black cemetery—evidence which she would use to ensure the death certificate classified the person as black. Not everyone accepted Drake's actions, and people filed thousands of cases against the office to have racial classifications changed and to protest her withholding legal documents of vital records. This caused much embarrassment and disruption, finally causing the city to fire her in 1965.

=== Louisiana French renaissance ===
In the wake of the "Cajun Renaissance" of the 1960s and 1970s, the (often racialized) Creole identity has traditionally received less attention than its Cajun counterpart. However, the late 2010s have seen a minor but notable resurgence of the Creole identity among linguistic activists of all races, including among white people whose parents or grandparents identify as Cajun or simply French.

Contemporary French-language media in Louisiana, such as Télé-Louisiane or Le Bourdon de la Louisiane, often use the term Créole in its original and most inclusive sense (i.e. without reference to race), and some English-language organizations like the Historic New Orleans Collection have published articles questioning the racialized Cajun-Creole dichotomy of the mid-twentieth century. Documentaries such as Nathan Rabalais' Finding Cajun examine the intersection and impact of Creole culture on what is commonly described as Cajun, likewise questioning the validity of recent racialization.

== Creole slaveowners ==
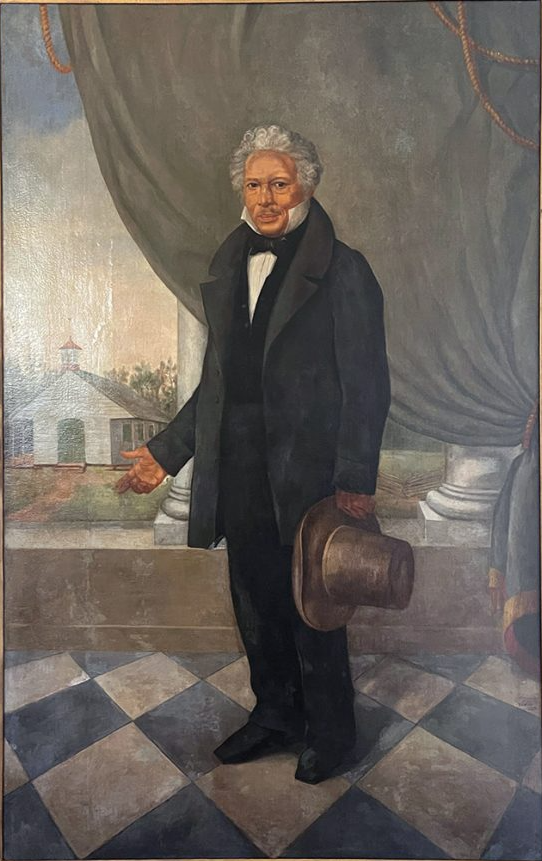
Nicholas Augustin Metoyer founder of St. Augustine Catholic Church and son of Marie Thérèse Coincoinn

Creoles of Color owned slaves as early as the 18th century during French and Spanish colonial times. The system began when men would either procreate with enslaved people. French and Spanish men chose to marry their partners and leave property and rights to their heirs. An elaborate system of Black slave ownership emerged, ensconcing the entire Louisiana territory. There are many cases of Black slave ownership. Marie Thérèse Coincoin was born into slavery but fell in love with a young French merchant named Claude Thomas Pierre Métoyer. Their offspring later became extremely wealthy and powerful, owning slaves and land in Natchez, Louisiana. Her son Nicholas Augustin Metoyer had a massive family and founded St. Augustine Catholic Church and Cemetery. He commissioned five paintings, including a portrait of himself, his wife, son, and daughter-in-law.

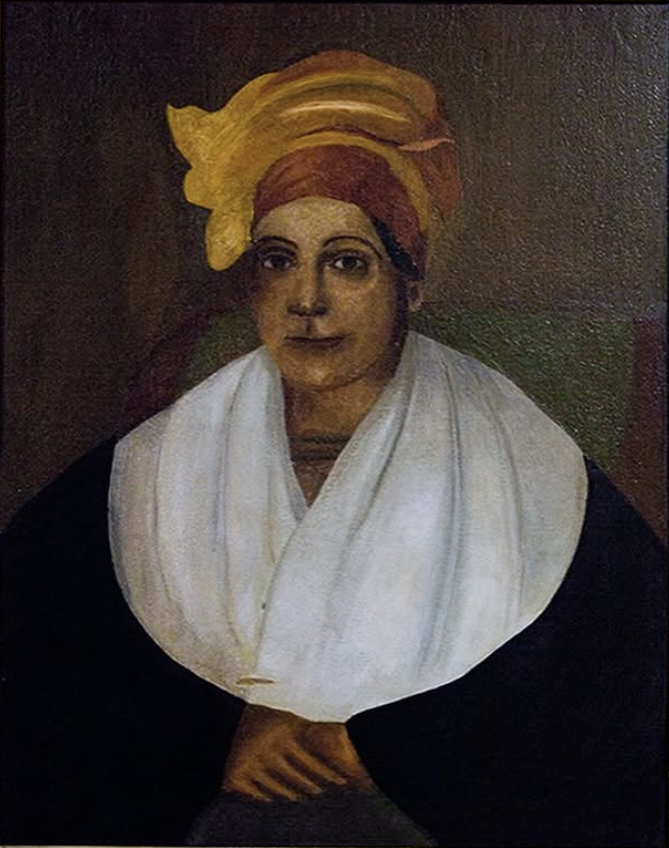
Marie Agnes Poissot Metoyer wife of Nicholas Augustin Metoyer

Maria Garcia de Fontenelle, another Creole of Color, was listed in countless slave records during the late 1700s. Her niece was Désirée Clary, the queen consort of Sweden. Maria's mixed-race daughter Amelie went on to marry a powerful judge named Jean François Canonge. Her grandson was a notable Creole southern playwright named Louis Placide Canonge. By 1830, in New Orleans, one in seven enslaved Black people had a Black master. Civil rights activist Victor-Eugene McCarty's mother Héloise Croy was a refugee from Saint-Domingue (modern-day Haiti) and a Creole woman of color who was a slave owner. Victor was raised in a wealthy household and studied piano in New Orleans under Professor J. Norres. Records indicate the Voodoo Queen of New Orleans, Marie Laveau, also owned slaves.

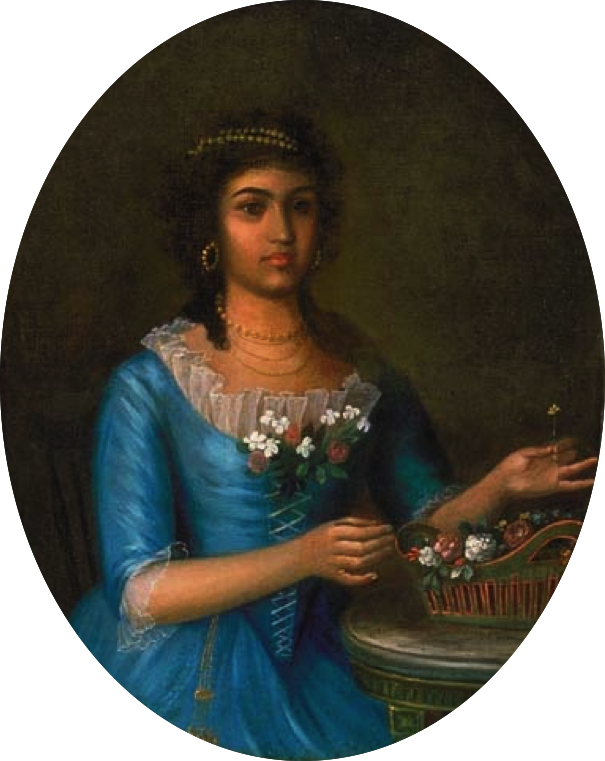
Athenais' mother Marianne Céleste Dragon

A mulatto Creole woman named Marie Claire from Pointe Coupee Parish owned a massive plantation with a large number of slaves named Austerlitz. Her father was Joseph Antoine Decuir and her mother was a free woman of color named Marie Francis de Beaulieu. The plantation was called Austerlitz due to its affiliation with Emperor Napoleon Bonaparte. Marie Claire was a member of the aristocratic Louisiana Porche family. The mixed-race family members received the same status as their white relatives at family gatherings.

Jean Baptist Lagarde had two children named Amelia and Cidalyse with a slave named Adelaide. His wife, a Creole woman named Marie Francesca Athenais Dimitry, sold them into slavery to prevent them from inheriting the Legarde estate. A court case entitled Andat v. Gilly ensued, illegitimizing their sale and the forfeiture of their estate. There were countless incidents of treacherous connivery among Creoles of Color in New Orleans. Among the freed slaves, illegitimate children were sold, siblings were sold, some were secretly murdered, and others shipped off to other parts of the country, all for insanely large sums of money inherited from wealthy white French men who desired to legitimize their mixed-race offspring. Creoles of Color were a powerful slave owning class until shortly after the Louisiana Purchase, when they were required to start passing as white as a legal solution, and some Creole slave owners suffered racial prejudice. Athenais Dimitry's mother Marianne Celeste Dragon was the daughter of a freed slave and became a well-known historical figure from New Orleans. Marianne and Andrea Dimitry established the Dimitry family, one of the most powerful Creole families of New Orleans. Most of the interracial Dimitry family fought for the Confederacy and were slave owners.

== Culture ==
=== Cuisine ===
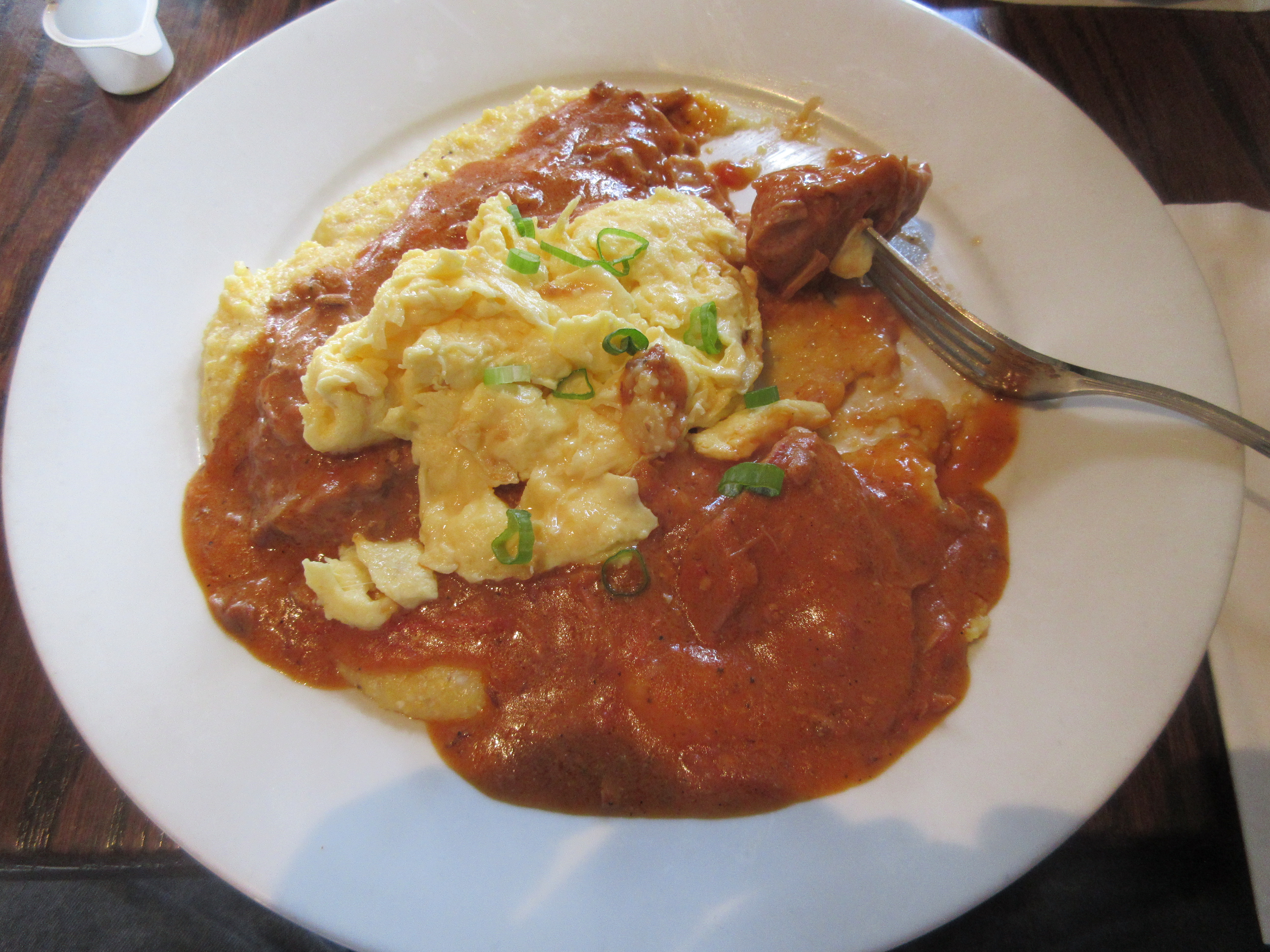
Grits and grillades

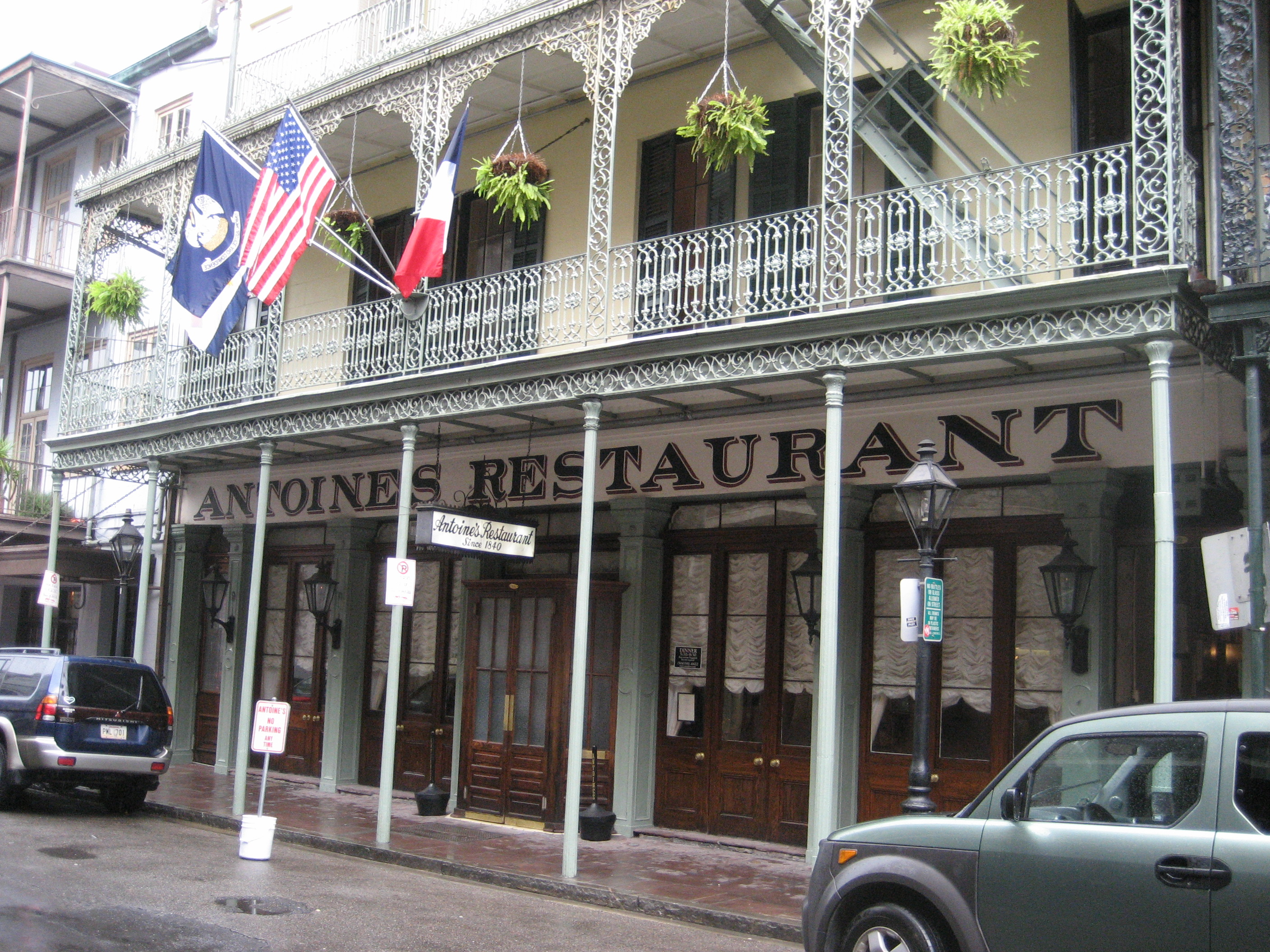
Antoine's restaurant is located in the French Quarter of New Orleans.

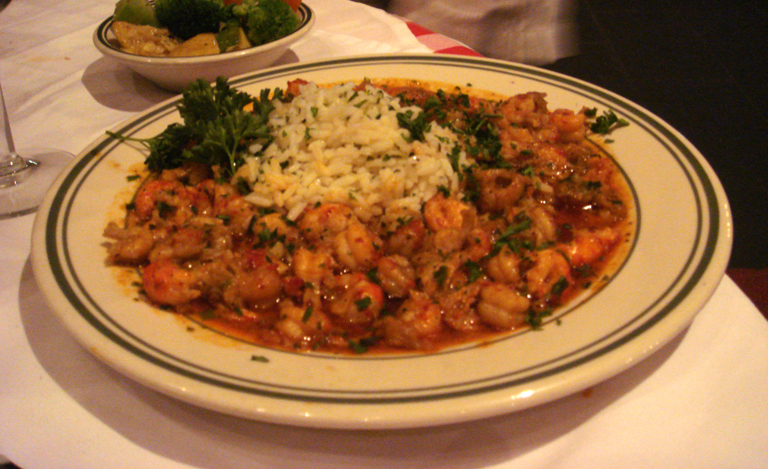
Crawfish étouffée

Louisiana Creole cuisine is recognized as a unique style of cooking originating in New Orleans, starting in the early 1700s. It makes use of what is sometimes called the Holy trinity: onions, celery and green peppers. It has developed primarily from various European, African, and Native American historic culinary influences. A distinctly different style of Creole or Cajun cooking exists in Acadiana.

Gumbo (Gombô in Louisiana Creole, Gombo in Louisiana French) is a traditional Creole dish from New Orleans with French, Spanish, Native American, African, German, Italian, and Caribbean influences. It is a roux-based meat stew or soup, sometimes made with some combination of any of the following: seafood (usually shrimp, crabs, with oysters optional, or occasionally crawfish), sausage, chicken (hen or rooster), alligator, turtle, rabbit, duck, deer or wild boar. Gumbo is often seasoned with filé, which is dried and ground sassafras leaves. Both meat and seafood versions also include the "Holy Trinity" and are served like stew over rice. It developed from French colonists trying to make bouillabaisse with New World ingredients. Starting with aromatic seasonings, the French used onions and celery as in a traditional mirepoix, but lacked carrots, so they substituted green bell peppers. Africans contributed okra, traditionally grown in regions of Africa, the Middle East and Spain. Gombo is the Louisiana French word for okra, It most likely comes from the Bambara language of West Africa in which Gombo means okra or also the Bantu words kilogombó or kigambó, also guingambó or quinbombó. "Gumbo" became the anglicized version of the word 'Gombo' after the English language became dominant in Louisiana. In Louisiana French dialects, the word "gombo" still refers to both the hybrid stew and the vegetable.

The Choctaw contributed filé; while the Bambara provided okra and rice. the Spanish contributed peppers and tomatoes; and new spices were adopted from Caribbean dishes. The French later favored a roux for thickening. In the 19th century, the Italians added garlic. After German immigrants arrived in large numbers, German bakers catered to the German clientele that preferred heavier, hard-crusted bread rather than the French bread preferred by the Creole population.

Jambalaya is the second of the famous Louisiana Creole dishes. Today, jambalaya is commonly made with seafood (usually shrimp) or chicken, or a combination of shrimp and chicken. Most versions contain smoked sausage, more commonly used instead of ham in modern versions. However, a version of jambalaya that uses ham with shrimp may be closer to the original Creole dish.

Jambalaya is prepared in two ways: "red" and "brown". Red is the tomato-based version native to New Orleans; it is also found in parts of Iberia and St. Martin Parishes, and generally uses shrimp or chicken stock. The red-style Creole jambalaya is the original version. The "brown" version is associated with Cajun cooking and does not include tomatoes.

Red beans and rice is a dish of Louisiana and Caribbean influence, originating in New Orleans. It contains red beans, the "holy trinity" of onion, celery, and bell pepper, and often andouille smoked sausage, pickled pork, or smoked ham hocks. The beans are served over white rice. It is one of the famous dishes in Louisiana, and is associated with "washday Monday". It could be cooked all day over a low flame while the women of the house attended to washing the family's clothes.

=== Music ===
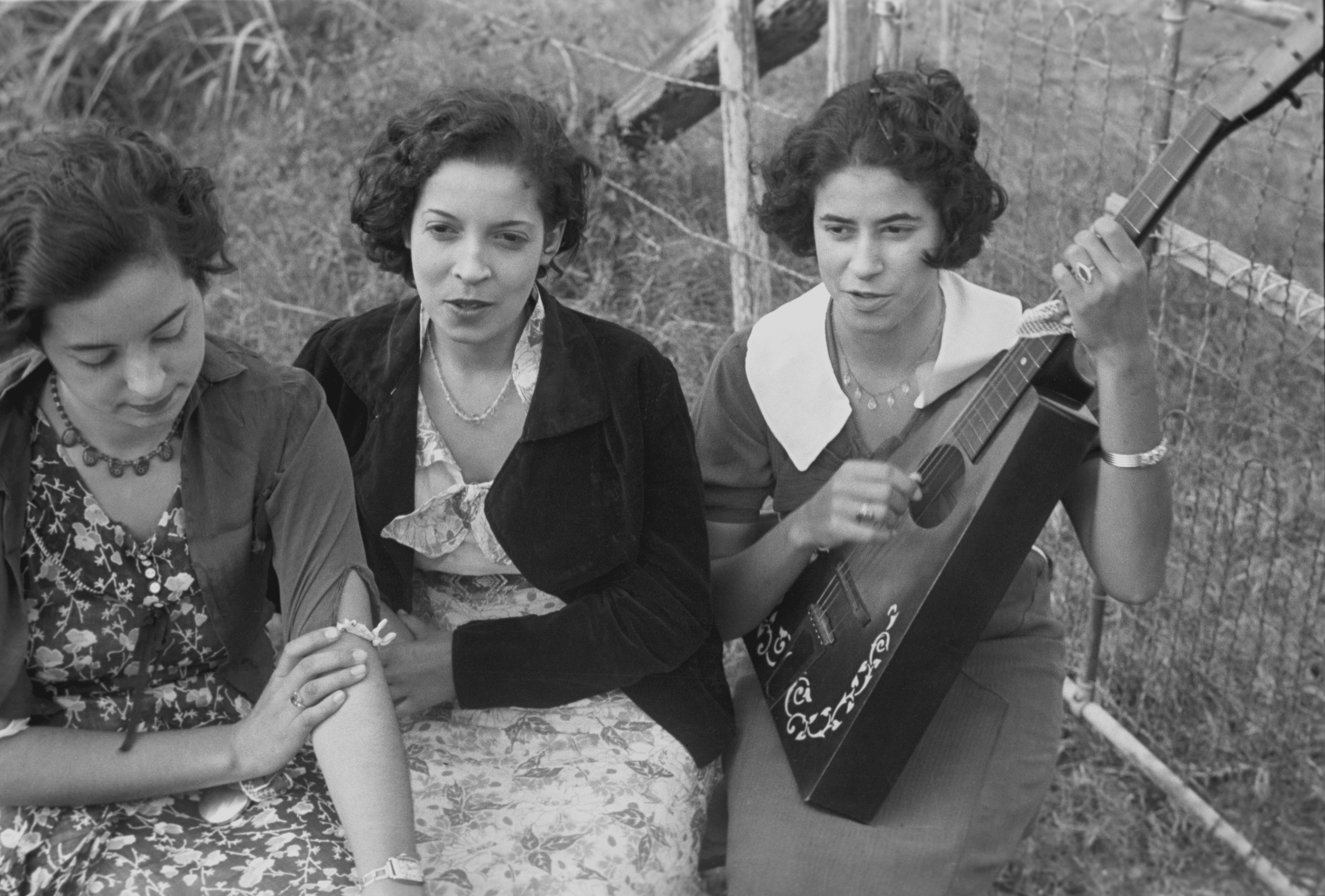
Creole women, Plaquemines Parish, Louisiana 1935

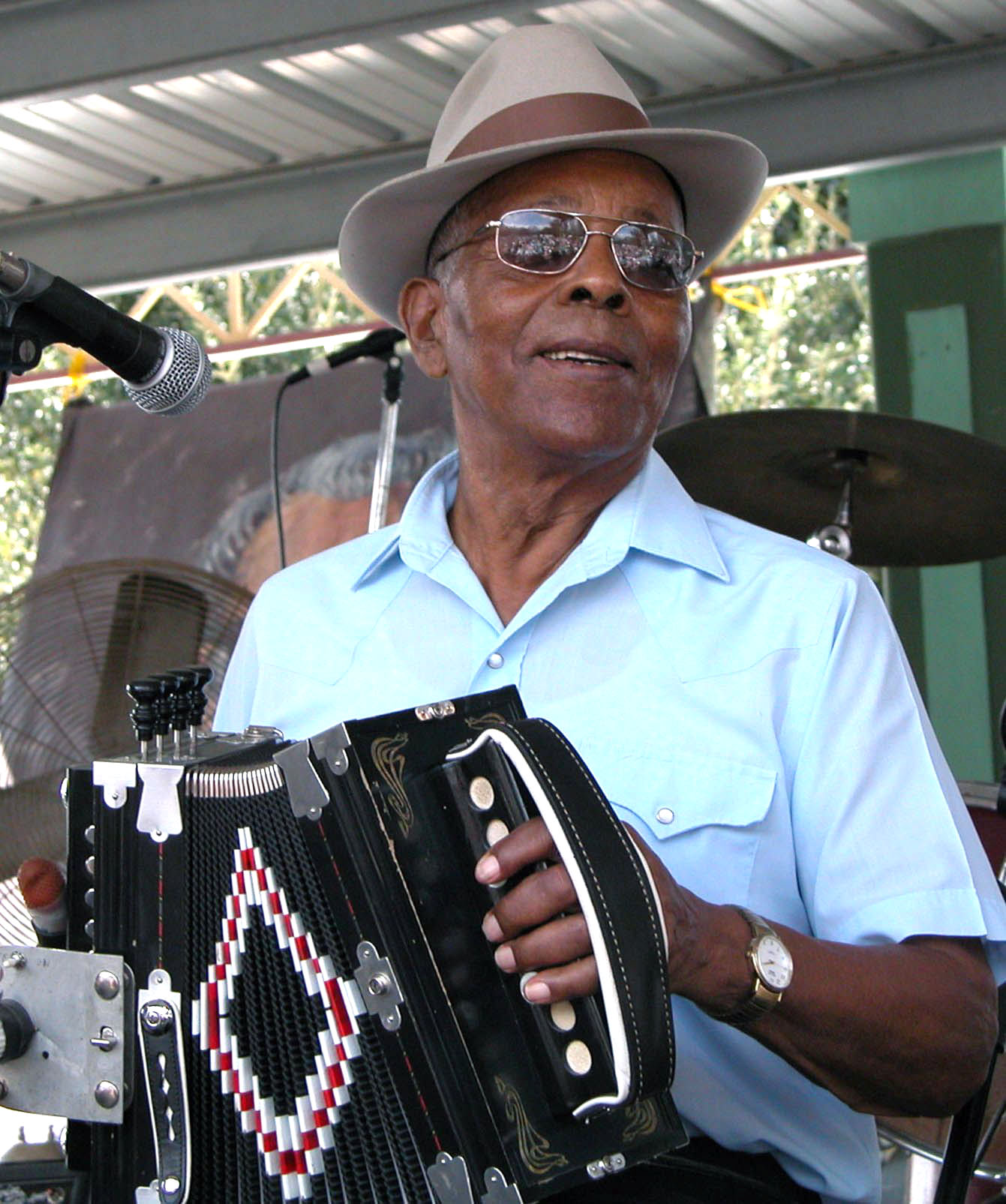
Creole accordionist Bois Sec Ardoin, longtime musical partner of Canray Fontenot and Wade Frugé

Alphonse "Bois Sec" Ardoin Zydeco (a transliteration in English of 'zaricô' (snapbeans) from the song, "Les haricots sont pas salés"), was born in black Creole communities on the prairies of southwest Louisiana in the 1920s. It is often considered the Creole music of Louisiana. Zydeco, a derivative of Cajun music, purportedly hails from Là-là, a genre of music now defunct, and old south Louisiana jurés. As Louisiana French and Louisiana Creole was the lingua franca of the prairies of southwest Louisiana, zydeco was initially sung only in Louisiana French or Creole. Later, Louisiana Creoles, such as the 20th-century Chénier brothers, Andrus Espree (Beau Jocque), Rosie Lédet and others began incorporating a more bluesy sound and added a new linguistic element to zydeco music: English. Today, zydeco musicians sing in English, Louisiana Creole or Colonial Louisiana French.

Today's Zydeco often incorporates a blend of swamp pop, blues, and/or jazz as well as "Cajun Music" (originally called Old Louisiana French Music). An instrument unique to zydeco is a form of washboard called the frottoir or scrub board. This is a vest made of corrugated aluminum, and played by the musician working bottle openers, bottle caps or spoons up and down the length of the vest. Another instrument used in both Zydeco and Cajun music since the 1800s is the accordion. Zydeco music makes use of the piano or button accordion while Cajun music is played on the diatonic accordion, or Cajun accordion, often called a "squeeze box". Cajun musicians also use the fiddle and steel guitar more often than do those playing Zydeco.

Zydeco can be traced to the music of enslaved African people from the 19th century. It is represented in Slave Songs of the United States, first published in 1867. The final seven songs in that work are printed with melody along with text in Louisiana Creole. These and many other songs were sung by slaves on plantations, especially in St. Charles Parish, and when they gathered on Sundays at Congo Square in New Orleans.

Among the Spanish Creole people highlights, between their varied traditional folklore, the Canarian Décimas, romances, ballads and pan-Hispanic songs date back many years, even to the Medieval Age. This folklore was carried by their ancestors from the Canary Islands to Louisiana in the 18th century. It also highlights their adaptation to the Isleño music to other music outside of the community (especially from the Mexican Corridos).

=== Language ===
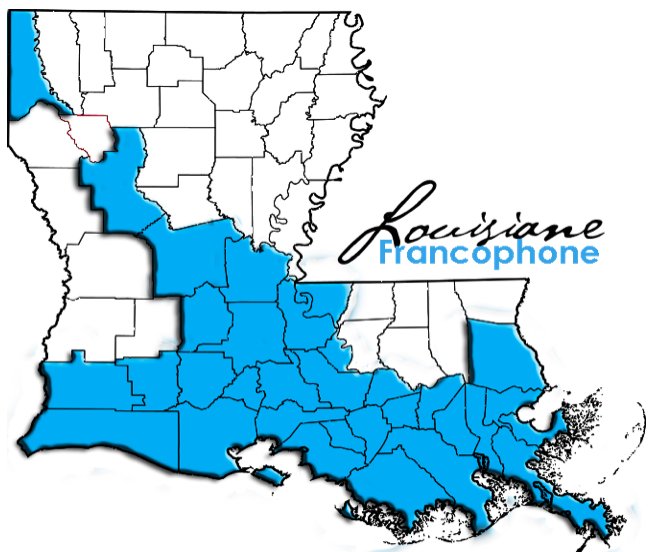
Louisiana French parishes

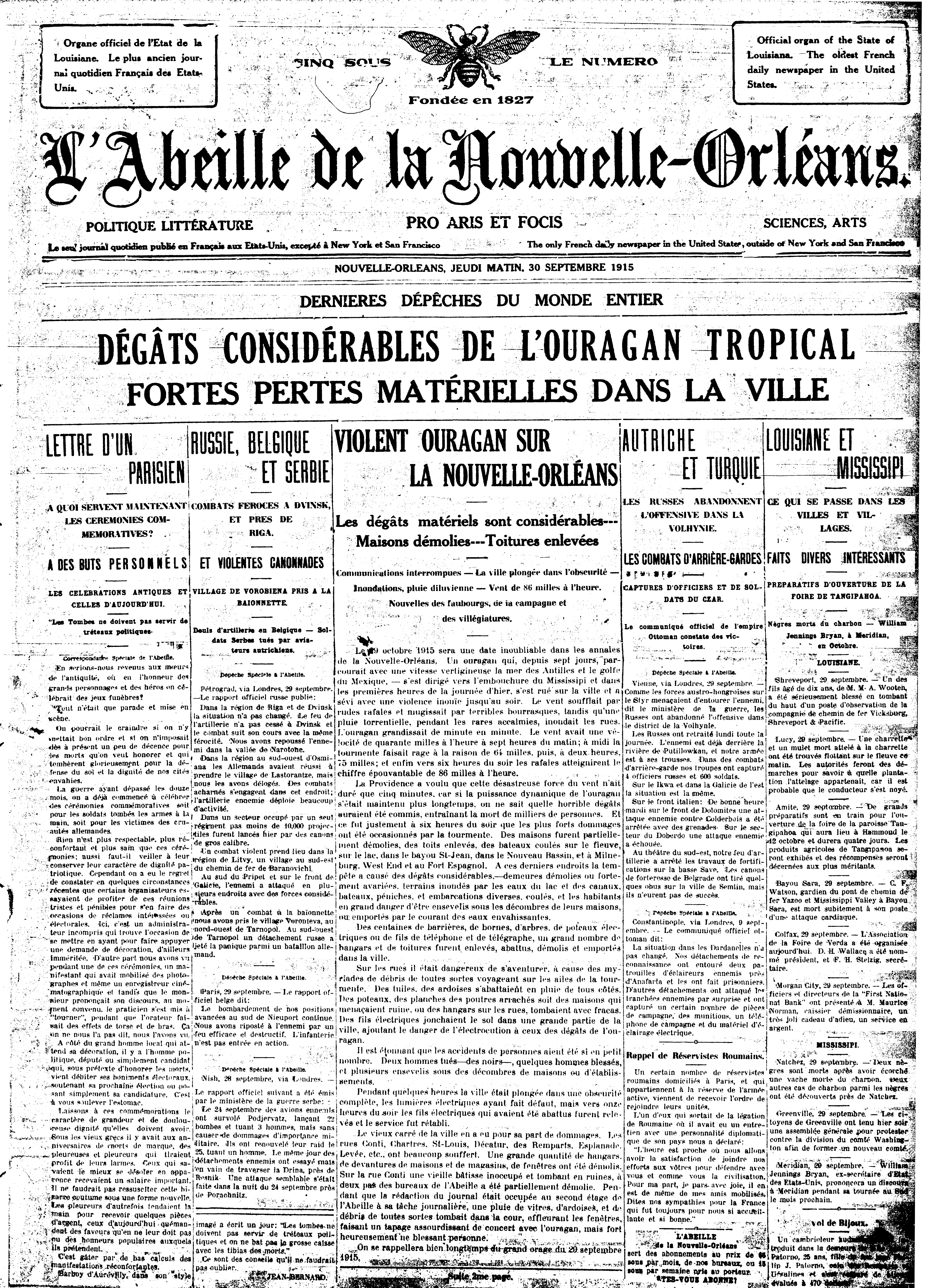
The New Orleans Bee, a French and English newspaper

Louisiana Creole (Kréyol La Lwizyàn) is a French Creole language spoken by the Louisiana Creole people and sometimes Cajuns and Anglo-residents of the state of Louisiana. The language consists of elements of French, Spanish, African (mainly from the Senegambian region), and Native American roots.

Louisiana French (LF) is the regional variety of the French language spoken throughout contemporary Louisiana by individuals who today identify ethno-racially as Creole, Cajun, or French, as well as some who identify as Spanish (particularly in New Iberia and Baton Rouge, where the Creole people are a mix of French and Spanish and speak the French language), African-American, white, Irish or of other origins. Through innovation, adaptation, interaction, and contact, individuals and groups continuously enrich the French language spoken in Louisiana, infusing it with linguistic features that are sometimes unique to the region.

Tulane University's Department of French and Italian website prominently declares, "In Louisiana, French is not a foreign language". Figures from U.S. decennial censuses report that roughly 250,000 Louisianans claimed to use or speak French in their homes.

Among the 18 governors of Louisiana between 1803 and 1865, six were French Creoles and spoke French: Jacques Villeré, Pierre Derbigny, Armand Beauvais, Jacques Dupré, Andre B. Roman and Alexandre Mouton.

According to the historian Paul Lachance, "the addition of white immigrants to the white creole population enabled French-speakers to remain a majority of the white population [in New Orleans] until almost 1830. If a substantial proportion of Creoles of color and slaves had not also spoken French, however, the Gallic community would have become a minority of the total population as early as 1820." In the 1850s, white Francophones remained an intact and vibrant community; they maintained instruction in French in two of the city's four school districts. In 1862, the Union general Ben Butler abolished French instruction in New Orleans schools, and statewide measures in 1864 and 1868 further cemented the policy. By the end of the 19th century, French usage in the city had faded significantly. However, as late as 1902 "one-fourth of the population of the city spoke French in ordinary daily intercourse, while another two-fourths was able to understand the language perfectly." Even in 1945, there were still elderly Creole women who could not speak English. The last major French-language newspaper in New Orleans, L'Abeille de la Nouvelle-Orléans, ceased publication on December 27, 1923, after ninety-six years. Some sources claim Le Courrier de la Nouvelle Orleans was in publication until 1955.

Today, people speak Louisiana French or Louisiana Creole, mainly in more rural areas. Also, during the '40s and '50s, many Creoles left Louisiana to find work in Texas, mostly in Houston and East Texas. The 5th ward of Houston, initially named Frenchtown, is known for its prevalent use of the French language and music. There were also Zydeco clubs started in Houston, like the famed Silver Slipper owned by a Creole named Alfred Cormier that has hosted the likes of Clifton Chenier and Boozoo Chavis. In steady waves starting in the 1830s to the 1860s and onward, a sizable number of Louisiana Creoles had also migrated through- or from Texas into Mexico, often by sea, with particular population concentrations in the state Veracruz – especially Tampico.

Spanish usage has declined significantly over the years among the Spanish Creole population. However, in the first half of the 20th century, most residents of Saint Bernard and Galveztown spoke the Spanish language in the Canarian Spanish dialect (the ancestors of these Creoles were from the Canary Islands) of the 18th century. The government of Louisiana imposed the use of English in these communities, particularly in schools such as Saint Bernard. Children who were caught speaking Spanish were fined and punished by their teachers. Now, only some people over 80 can speak Spanish in these communities, and most of the youth of Saint Bernard can only speak English.

==== Florida ====
Based on U.S. census data from 2011 to 2015, the U.S. Department of Justice also estimated that a little over 173,000 Florida residents spoke French Creole, with the highest concentrations of speakers being located in Palm Beach County, Broward County, and Miami-Dade County in South Florida, accounting for both Louisiana Creoles and Haitian Creoles. Pensacola and Jacksonville in Florida also have French Creole-speaking minorities, on account of Gullah, Atlantic Creole, and Haitian Creole migration and language mixing between Louisiana, South Carolina, North Carolina, Georgia, and Florida, particularly West Florida.

=== New Orleans Mardi Gras ===
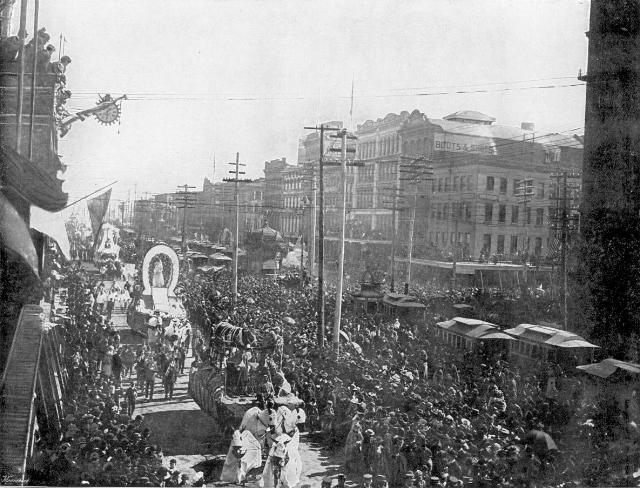
New Orleans Mardi Gras in the early 1890s

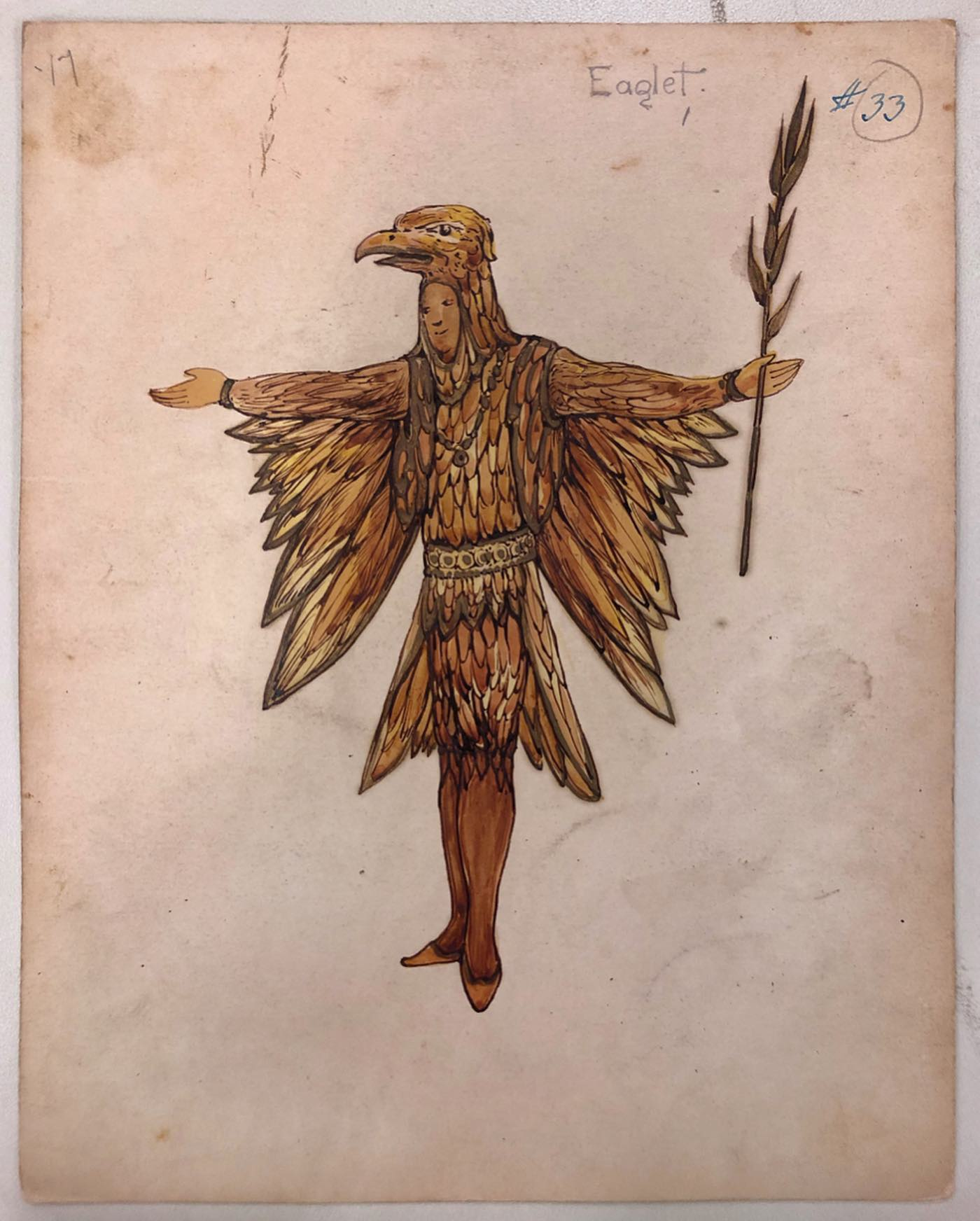
A 1913 Mardi Gras costume

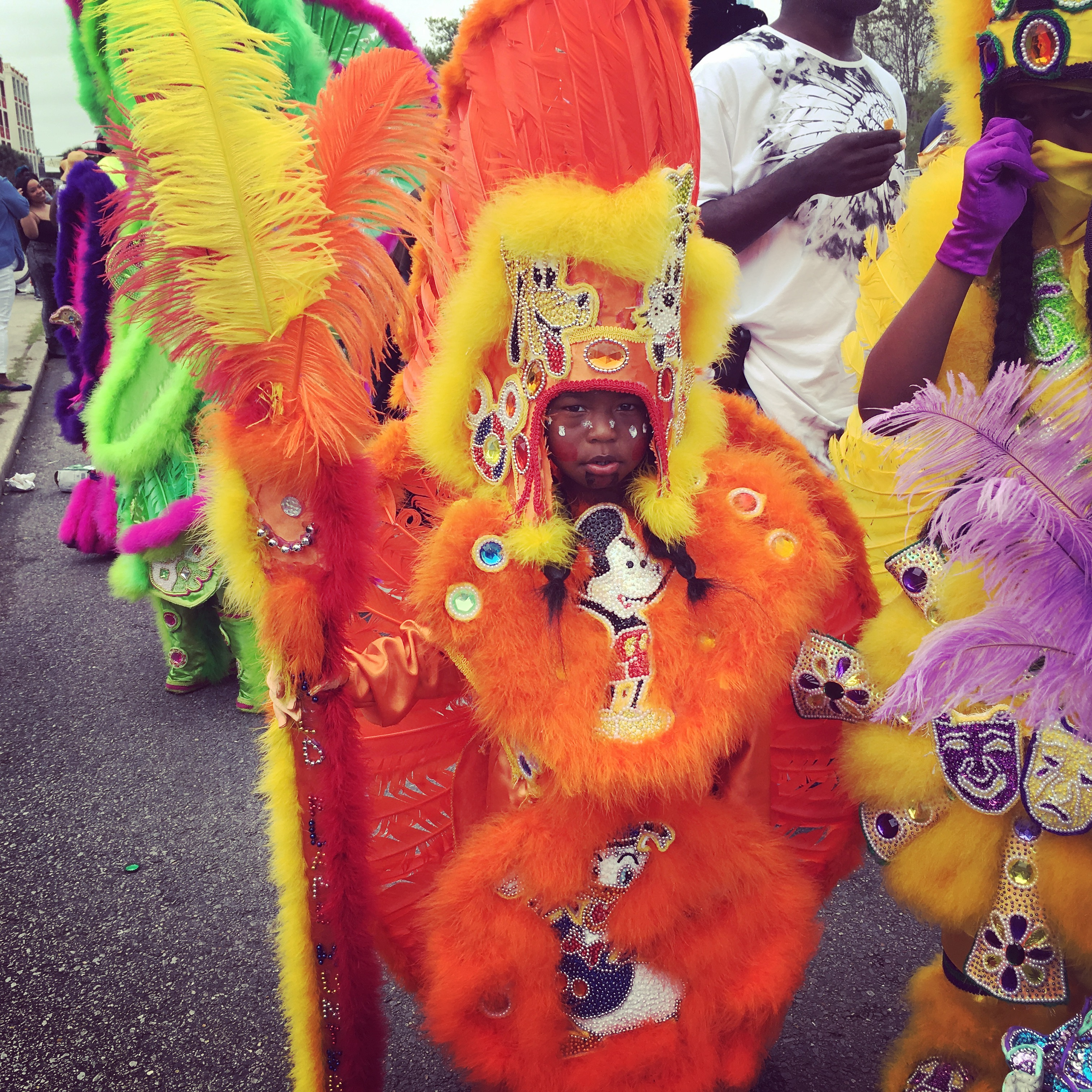
A Mardi Gras Indian costume

Mardi Gras (Fat Tuesday in English) in New Orleans, Louisiana, is a Carnival celebration well known throughout the world. It has colonial French roots.

The New Orleans Carnival season, with roots in preparing for the start of the Christian season of Lent, starts after Twelfth Night, on Epiphany (January 6). It is a season of parades, balls (some of them masquerade balls) and king cake parties. It has traditionally been part of the winter social season; at one time "coming out" parties for young women at débutante balls were timed for this season.

Celebrations are concentrated for about two weeks before and through Fat Tuesday (Mardi Gras in French), the day before Ash Wednesday. Usually, there is one major parade each day (weather permitting), but there are several large parades on many days. The largest and most elaborate parades take place on the last five days of the season. In the final week of Carnival, many events, both large and small, take place throughout New Orleans and surrounding communities.

The parades in New Orleans are organized by Carnival krewes. Krewe float riders toss throws to the crowds; the most common throws are strings of plastic colorful beads, doubloons (aluminum or wooden dollar-sized coins usually impressed with a krewe logo), decorated plastic throw cups, and small inexpensive toys. Major krewes follow the same parade schedule and route each year.

While many tourists center their Mardi Gras season activities on Bourbon Street and the French Quarter, none of the major Mardi Gras parades has entered the Quarter since 1972 because of its narrow streets and overhead obstructions. Instead, major parades originate in the Uptown and Mid-City districts and follow a route along St. Charles Avenue and Canal Street, on the upriver side of the French Quarter.

To New Orleanians, "Mardi Gras" specifically refers to the Tuesday before Lent, the highlight of the season. The term can also be used less specifically for the whole Carnival season, sometimes as "the Mardi Gras season". The terms "Fat Tuesday" or "Mardi Gras Day" always refer only to that specific day.

=== Folktales ===
Some of the earliest written examples of Creole folklore were transcribed by Alcée Fortier, a linguist who studied the grammar and structure of Louisiana Creole. For example, the stories in his collection Louisiana Folk-Tales (1895) were told to him by Black Creole storytellers both in New Orleans and St. James Parish. The collection contains many examples of animal characters, influenced from Africa. The animals are often humanized by an honorific title such as "Compair" (Compère) and exhibit specific character traits. Also, etiological tales (or “why” tales) are common. Lapin, meaning “rabbit” in Louisiana French and Creole, is the most renowned of the animal tricksters and often plays tricks on Bouki, whose name is derived from the word bukki, Wolof word for “hyena.”

== Creole cultures ==
=== Cajun Creoles ===
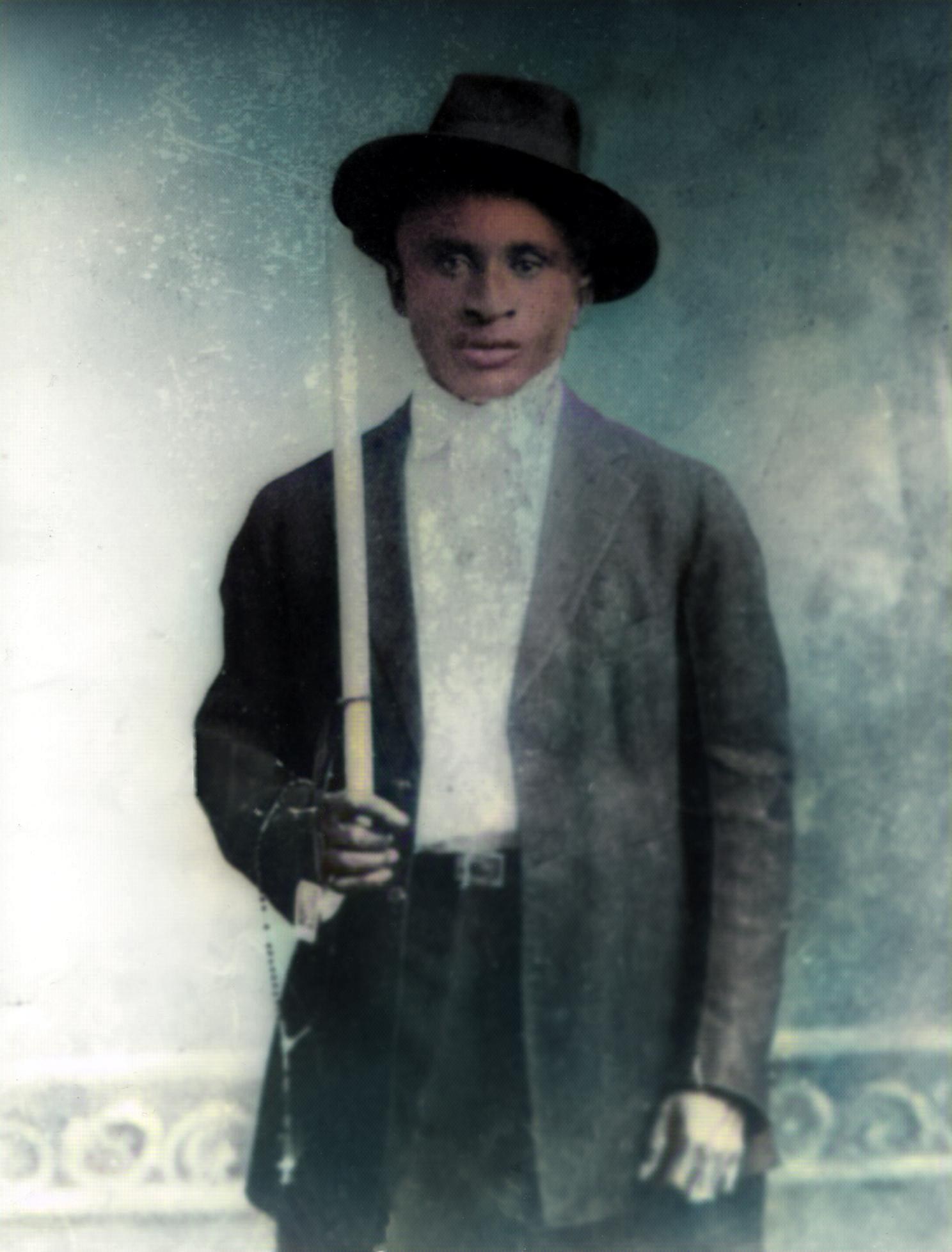
Amédé Ardoin the first Black Cajun recording artist; he only spoke Cajun French.

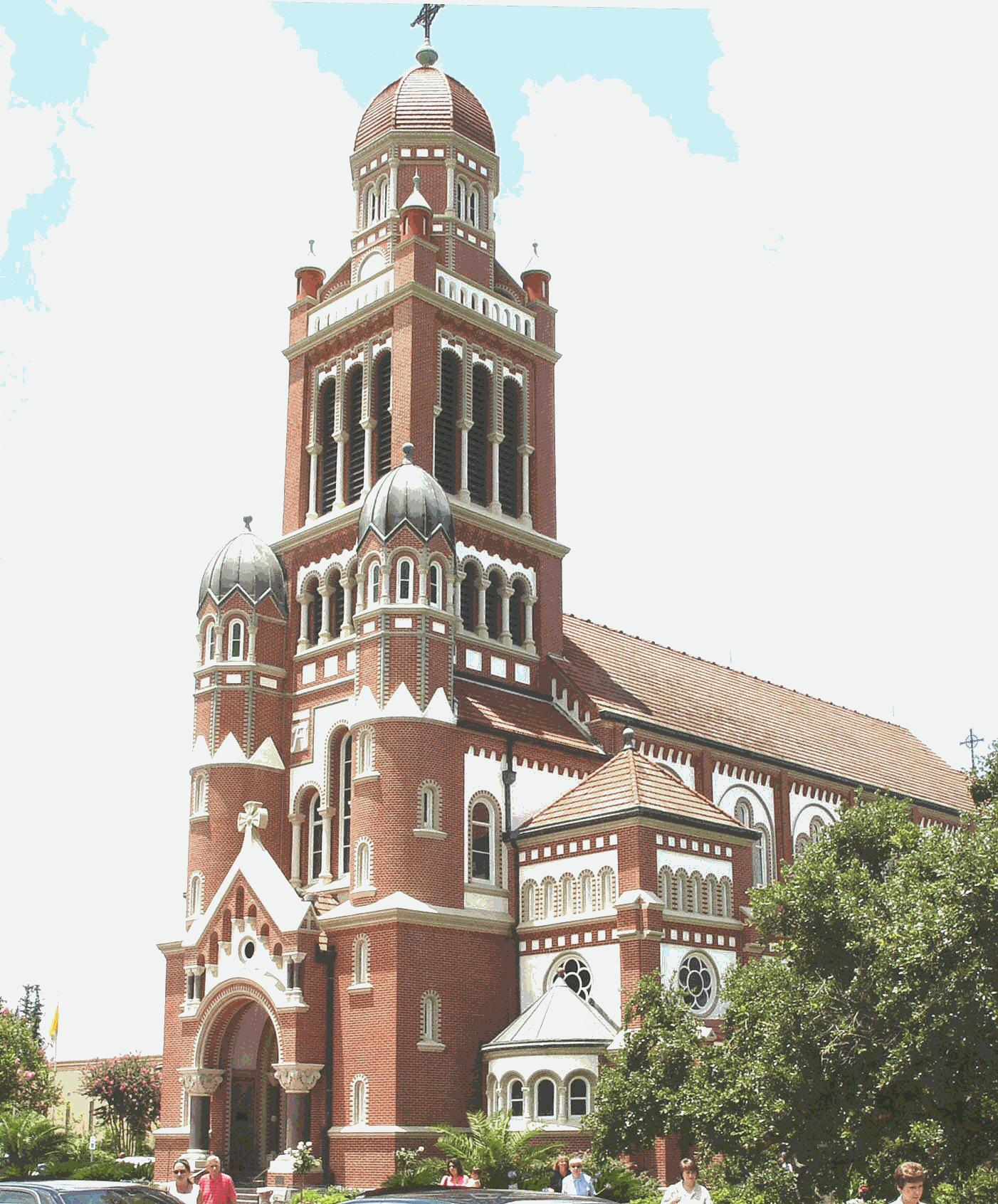
The Cathedral of Saint John the Evangelist in Lafayette, Louisiana

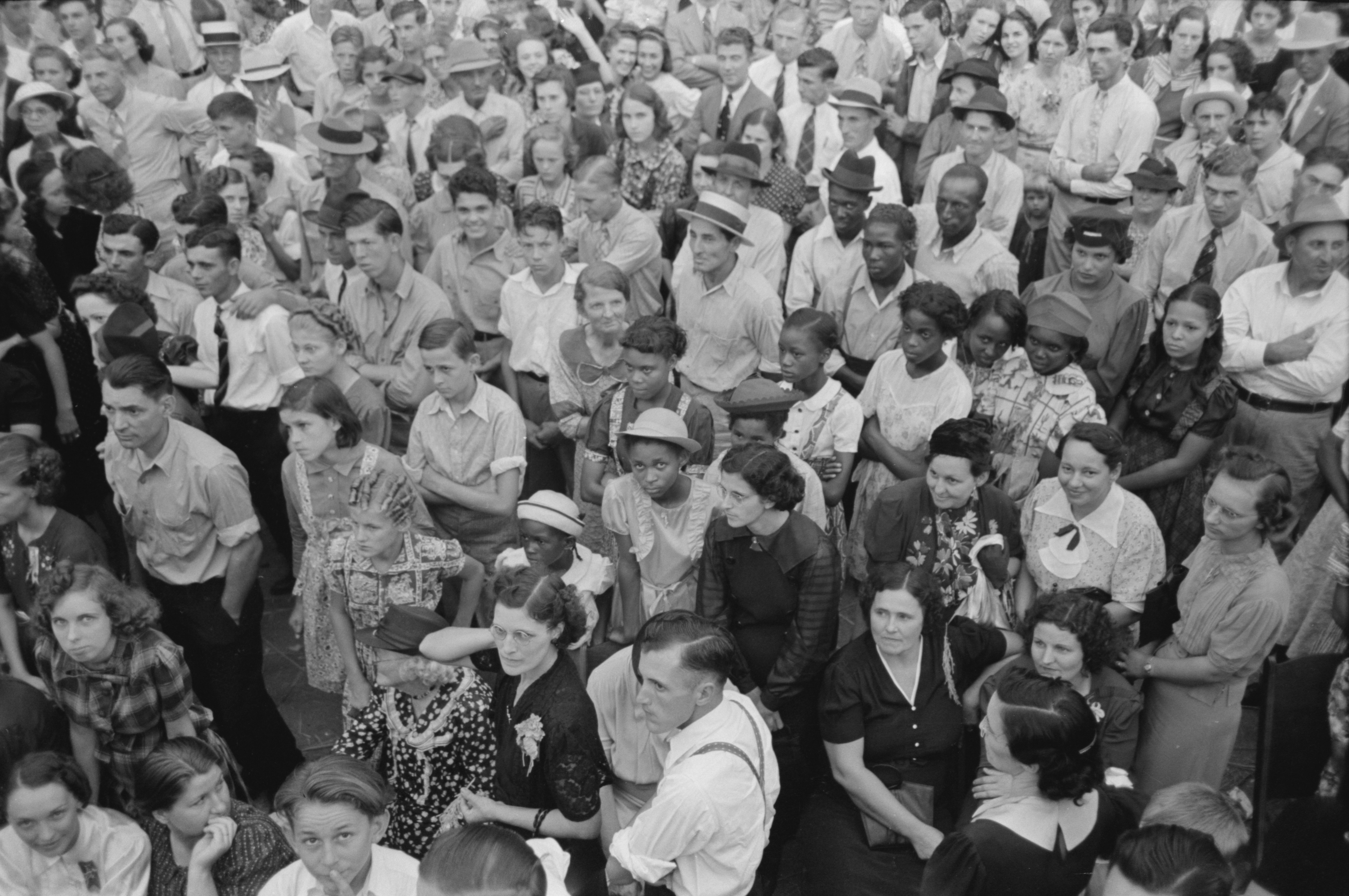
The Cajun-Creole population of Crowley enjoying a Cajun Music Concert in 1938.

The descendants of Cajuns were settlers of the French colony of Acadia who settled in southern Louisiana. This Cajun ethnic group developed when Acadian hunters, trappers, and fishermen intermarried with Indians and Black people. Black Louisiana Frenchmen have historically self-identified as Cajun, using the term in regards to the ethnicity of the Cajun Country and the language they speak. For example, Amédé Ardoin only spoke Cajun French and, at his height, was known as the first Black Cajun recording artist. Similarly, Clifton Chenier the King of Zydeco, routinely self-identified as a Black Cajun:

"Bonjour, comment ça va monsieur?" Clifton Chenier greeted his cheering crowd at the 1975 Montreux Jazz Festival. "They call me the Black Cajun Frenchman."

People of the Cajun Country have historically described what the Cajun nationality means to them. Brandon Moreau, a Cajun of Basile, Louisiana, described Cajun as an "inclusive term designating region, descent, or heritage – not race." Moreau also described an incident of where he used the term coonass with a good friend of his: "We were all talking in the hall, and I said I was a coonass. She said she was Cajun, but that she would never be a coonass. She's black and it offended her."

Cajun culture, due to its mixed Latin-Creole nature, had fostered more laissez-faire attitudes between black and white people in the Cajun Country than anywhere else in the South. Roman Catholicism actively preached tolerance and condemned racism and all hate crimes; the Roman Church threatened to excommunicate any of its members who would dare to break its laws.

Anglo-Americans openly discriminated against Cajuns because they were Catholics, had a Latin Culture, and spoke Cajun French. White Cajuns and White Creoles accepted advances in racial equality, and they had compassion for Black Cajuns, Black Creoles, and African Americans. In the 1950s, twice as many black people in Louisiana's French-Catholic parishes registered to vote compared to black people in the Anglo-Protestant parishes.

==== Americanization of Acadiana (1950–1970) ====
When the United States of America began assimilating and Americanizing the parishes of the Cajun Country between the 1950s and 1970s, they imposed segregation and reorganized the inhabitants of the Cajun Country to identify racially as either "white" Cajuns or "black" Creoles. As the younger generations were made to abandon speaking French and French customs, the White or Indian Cajuns assimilated into the Anglo-American host culture, and the Black Cajuns assimilated into the African-American culture.

Cajuns looked to the Civil Rights Movement and other Black liberation and empowerment movements as a guide for fostering Louisiana's French cultural renaissance. A Cajun student protester in 1968 declared "We're slaves to a system. Throw away the shackles... and be free with your brother."

=== Cane River Creoles ===
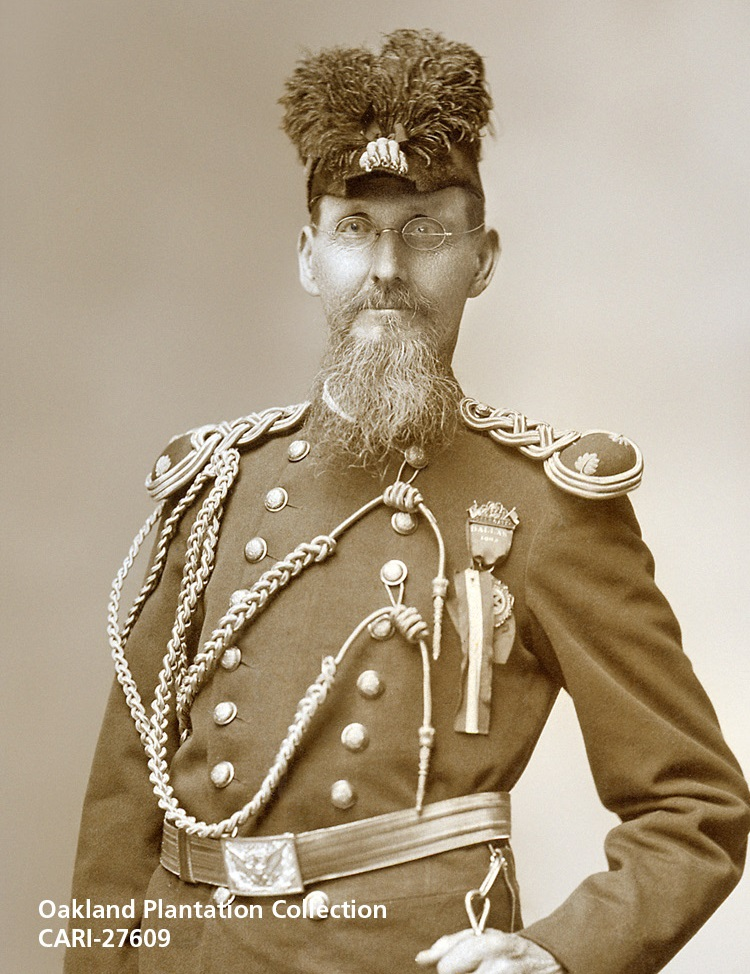
Cane River Creole officer Jacques Alphonse Prudhomme

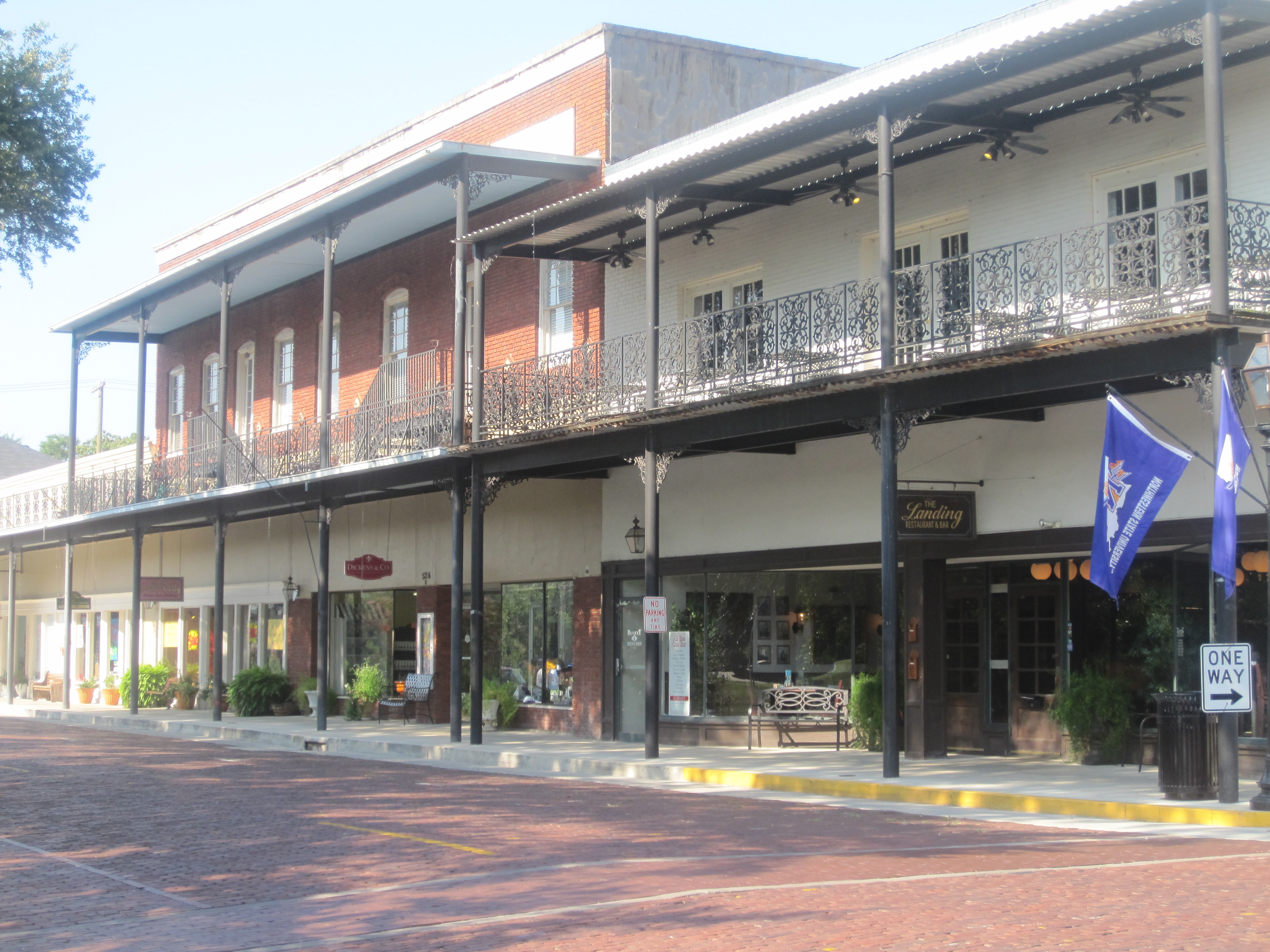
Creole architecture in Natchitoches

While the sophisticated Creole society of New Orleans has historically received much attention, the Cane River (Rivière aux Cannes) area developed its own strong Creole culture. Creole migrants from New Orleans and various ethnic groups, including Africans, Spanish, Frenchmen, and Native Americans, inhabited this region and mixed together in the 18th and early 19th centuries. The community is located in and around Isle Brevelle in lower Natchitoches Parish, Louisiana. There are many Creole communities within Natchitoches Parish, including Natchitoches, Cloutierville, Derry, Gorum, and Natchez. Many of their historic plantations still exist. Some have been designated as National Historic Landmarks and are noted within the Cane River National Heritage Area, as well as the Cane River Creole National Historical Park. Some plantations are sites on the Louisiana African American Heritage Trail.

Isle Brevelle, the area of land between Cane River and Bayou Brevelle, encompasses approximately 18,000 acres (73 km^{2}) of land, 16,000 acres of which are still owned by descendants of the original Creole families. The Cane River as well as Avoyelles and St. Landry Creole family surnames include but are not limited to: Antee, Anty, Arceneaux, Arnaud, Balthazar, Barre', Bayonne, Beaudoin, Bellow, Bernard, Biagas, Bossier, Boyér, Brossette, Buard, Byone, Carriere, Cassine, Catalon, Chevalier, Chretien, Christophe, Cloutier, Colson, Colston, Conde, Conant, Coutée, Cyriak, Cyriaque, Damas, DeBòis, DeCuir, Deculus, DeLouche, Delphin, De Sadier, De Soto, Dubreil, Dunn, Dupré. Esprit, Fredieu, Fuselier, Gallien, Goudeau, Gravés, Guillory, Hebert, Honoré, Hughes, LaCaze, LaCour, Lambre', Landry, Laurent, LéBon, Lefìls, Lemelle, LeRoux, Le Vasseur, Llorens, Mathés, Mathis, Métoyer, Mezière, Monette, Moran, Mullone, Pantallion, Papillion, Porche, PrudHomme, Rachal, Ray, Reynaud, Roque, Sarpy, Sers, Severin, Simien, St. Romain, St. Ville, Sylvie, Sylvan, Tournoir, Tyler, Vachon, Vallot, Vercher and Versher. (Most of the surnames are of French and sometimes Spanish origin).

=== St. Landry Parish Creoles ===
St. Landry Parish has a significant population of Creoles, especially in Opelousas and its surrounding areas. The traditions and Creole heritage are prevalent in Opelousas, Port Barre, Melville, Palmetto, Lawtell, Eunice, Swords, Mallet, Frilot Cove, Plaisance, Pitreville, and many other villages, towns and communities. The Roman Catholic Church and French/Creole language are dominant features of this rich culture. Zydeco musicians host festivals all through the year.

== Notable people ==
- Lloyd, singer
- Prince, singer
- Beyoncé, singer
- Troian Bellisario, actress
- Nicole Richie, American TV personality
- Solange Knowles, singer
- Leah Chase, chef
- Megan Thee Stallion, rapper
- Anne des Cadeaux Brevelle, explorer and religious leader
- Victoria Monet, singer
- Tina Knowles, entrepreneur
- K. D. Aubert, actress
- Lil' Fizz, rapper
- Tristin Mays, actress
- Gizelle Bryant, American TV personality
- Ice-T, rapper
- Robert Ri'chard, actor
- Brett Favre, American football quarterback
- Pope Leo XIV, first pope from the United States
- Nahshon Dion, award-winning writer and filmmaker

== See also ==
- Creoles of color
- Cane River Creole National Historical Park
- Isle Brevelle
- Criollo people
- Melrose Plantation
- French Quarter
- Faubourg Marigny
- Tremé
- Little New Orleans
- Frenchtown, Houston
- Magnolia Springs, Alabama
- Institute Catholique
- 7th Ward of New Orleans
- Jean Lafitte National Historical Park and Preserve
- Isleños
- Spanish Americans
- French Americans
- Cajuns
- Canarian Americans
- History of New Orleans
- Haitians
- Saint-Domingue Creoles
- Bayou Brevelle
- Cane River
- Afro-Seminole Creole
- French Louisianians
- Louisiana (New France)
- Louisiana (New Spain)
