= Dimitri =

Dimitri, Dimitry, Demetri or variations thereof may refer to:

== People ==
=== Given name ===
- Dimitri (clown), Swiss clown and mime Dimitri Jakob Muller (1935–2016)
- Dimitri Atanasescu (1836–1907), Ottoman-born Aromanian teacher
- Dimitri Ayoloma, Central African warlord
- Dimitry Bertaud (born 1998), French football goalkeeper
- Dimitry Caloin (born 1990), French footballer
- Dimitri Davidović (born 1944), Serbian football manager and former player
- Dimitri Flowers (born 1996), American football player
- Dimitri Granjux (born 2005), French para swimmer
- Dimitry Imbongo (born 1990), Congolese footballer playing in Germany
- Demetri Martin (born 1973), American comedian
- Dimitri Marx (born 1998), Swiss slalom canoeist
- Dimitri Gogos (1931–2019), Greek-Australian journalist
- Dimitry Ipatov (born 1984), Russian ski jumper
- Dimitri Kitsikis (1935–2021), Greek geopolitician
- Dimitry Kochenov, professor of legal studies
- Demetri Martin (born 1973), American comedian
- Demetri McCamey (born 1989), American basketball player
- Dimitry Muravyev (born 1979), Kazakhstani former road bicycle racer
- Dimitri Nanopoulos (born 1948), Greek physicist
- Dimitri Pavadé (born 1989), French para-athlete
- Dimitri Payet (born 1987), French footballer
- Dimitri Roger (born 1992), American rapper known professionally as Rich the Kid
- Dimitri Sartison (born 1980), Russian former boxer, WBA super-middleweight champion
- Dimitri Shostakovich (born 1906), Russian composer
- Dimitri Simes (born 1947), Russian-American author, editor, and political pundit
- Dimitry Sydor (born 1955), Rusyn archpriest of the Cathedral of Christ the Saviour in Uzhhorod, Ukraine
- Dimitri Van den Bergh (born 1994), Belgian professional darts player
- Dimitri Vegas, Belgian DJ, part of Dimitri Vegas & Like Mike
- St Dimitry (died 306), Greek Christian martyr and Orthodox saint
- Dimitry Zvegintzov (1911–1984), British Army brigadier

=== Surname ===
- Alexander Dimitry (1805–1883), mixed-race Louisiana Creole, first state superintendent of public instruction in Louisiana, author, diplomat, educator, journalist, lawyer, orator, publicist and member of the Confederate government, son of Andrea Dimitry
- Andrea Dimitry (1775–1852), Greek-American merchant and soldier
- Andrew Dimitri, American politician
- Antonio Dimitri (1931–2019), Italian actor and singer
- Charles Patton Dimitry (1837–1910), mixed-race Creole author, poet, journalist, inventor and historian, son of Alexander Dimitry
- David Dimitri, tightrope walker
- John Bull Smith Dimitry (1835–1901), mixed-race Creole American author, professor and Confederate soldier, son of Alexander Dimitry
- Marco Dimitri (1963–2021), an Italian Satanist
- Nick Dimitri, American stuntman and actor
- Richard Dimitri (1942–2025), American character actor and comedian

=== Stage name ===
- Dimitri from Paris, French DJ Dimitrios Yerasimos (born 1963)

== Fictional characters ==
- Dimitri, a character from the 1997 film Anastasia
- Dimitri Alexandre Blaiddyd, a character from the video games Fire Emblem: Three Houses and Fire Emblem Warriors: Three Hopes
- Demitri Maximoff, a character from the Darkstalkers video game franchise
- Dimitri Rascalov, the main antagonist of the 2008 video game Grand Theft Auto IV
- Demitri Alexopoulos, one of the main characters of Cobra Kai
- Dimitri Petrenko, a character from Call of Duty: World at War
- Dimitri Belikov, a character from the book series Vampire Academy written by Richelle Mead

== See also ==
- Dmitry, a masculine given name, Slavic version of Greek name Demetrios
