= George Pandely =

Louisiana Creole Politician

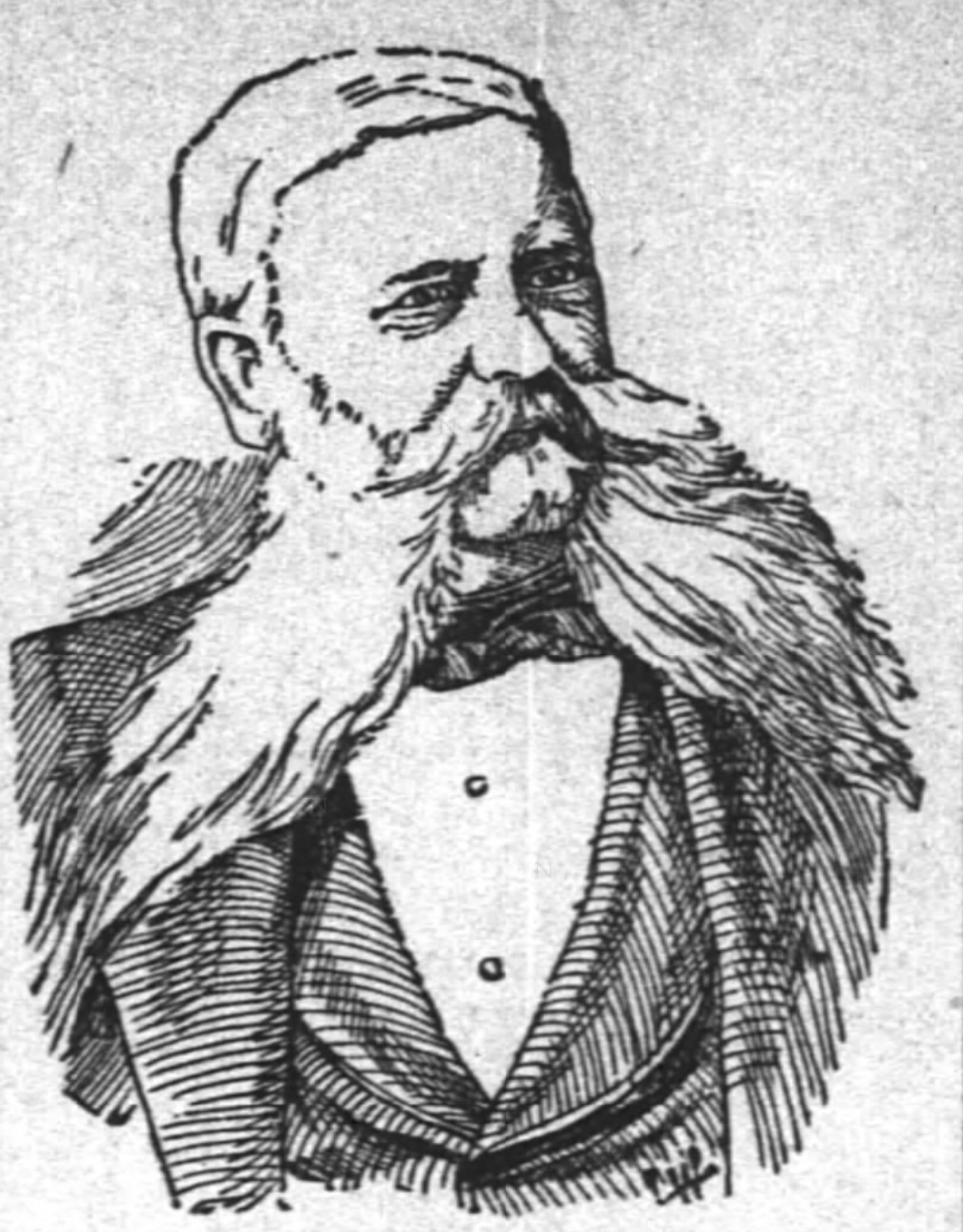

New Orleans Assistant Alderman
- In office March 28, 1853 – November 4, 1853
- In office April 23, 1868 – March 26, 1870

Personal details
- Born: August 1829 New Orleans, Louisiana, US
- Died: September 28, 1894 (aged 65) New Orleans, Louisiana, US
- Resting place: Saint Louis Cemetery No. 1
- Spouse: Ernestine Martainville (m. 1852–1875)
- Parents: Paul Pandely (father); Euphrosine Dimitry (mother)
- Relatives: Alexander Dimitry; Marianne Celeste Dragon; Michel Dragon; Charles Patton Dimitry; John Bull Smith Dimitry; Ernest Lagarde; Theodore John Dimitry Jr. Dracos Anthony Dimitry
- Profession: Lawyer; Politician; Railroad Superintendent; Court Clerk
- Known for: Pandelly Affair; Pandely Canal
- Family: Dimitry Family (Creoles)

George Pandely (August 1829 – September 28, 1894) was a mixed race Louisiana creole. He was a court clerk, teacher, politician, entrepreneur, and superintendent of different railroad companies from 1859 to 1883 in New Orleans. He was a member of the prominent New Orleans mixed Greek Creole family known as the Dimitry Family. He eventually became part owner and the president of the Whitney Irons Works company of New Orleans from 1883 for the remainder of his life. Pandely is known for being removed from public office as assistant alderman in New Orleans due to his African heritage in 1853. The incident became known as the Pandelly Affair and forced the Dimitry Family to create a fictitious genealogy where their lineage was derived from Native Americans rather than African people which was a clear case of ethnocide.

Pandely was born on his father Paul Pandely's plantation in New Orleans. His father was of Greek and English descent and George's grandmother was a member of the English royal House of Stuart. Pandely's mother Euphrosine Dimitry was a member of the Dimitry Family. Her younger brother was Alexander Dimitry. Pandely grew up in an academic household. His father was a professor of English at Poydras College. Pandely was interested in public office from a young age, he started out as a census taker in 1850. By 1853 he was elected assistant alderman of New Orleans but he was pressured to resign due to his African heritage. A civil trial ensued entitled Pandelly v. Wiltz (1854). The next year he became a court clerk, a position which he held on and off for the remainder of his life. By 1859, he was hired as the superintendent of the Pontchartrain Railroad. While the Union forces controlled the South Pandely was able to take the position of assistant alderman under the governorship of Joshua Baker and then Henry C. Warmoth between 1868 and 1870. By 1870, he was also listed as president and superintendent of Morgan's Louisiana and Texas Railroad.

Pandely was a Freemason and a member of the Orleans Lodge No. 78. He was also a member of the Sons of Temperance Louisiana Division No. 11 along with his uncle Micheal Dracos Dimitry. Pandely was on the Board of Administrators of the Charity Hospitals of New Orleans. Pandely was also affiliated with The Boston Club and the New Orleans Chess, Checkers and Whist Club. He died with distinction at the age of 65 in New Orleans. His son-in-law Arthur W. De Roades along with other distinguished guests were present at his funeral ceremony and his pallbearers included Benjamin F. Jonas, Rudolph Matas. He was buried with other members of his family at Saint Louis Cemetery Number 1. St. Maurice Avenue in New Orleans is the location that was known as Pandely's Canal. His first cousin Dracos Anthony Dimitry successfully became mayor of Carencro, Louisiana from 1893 to 1899.

== Early life ==
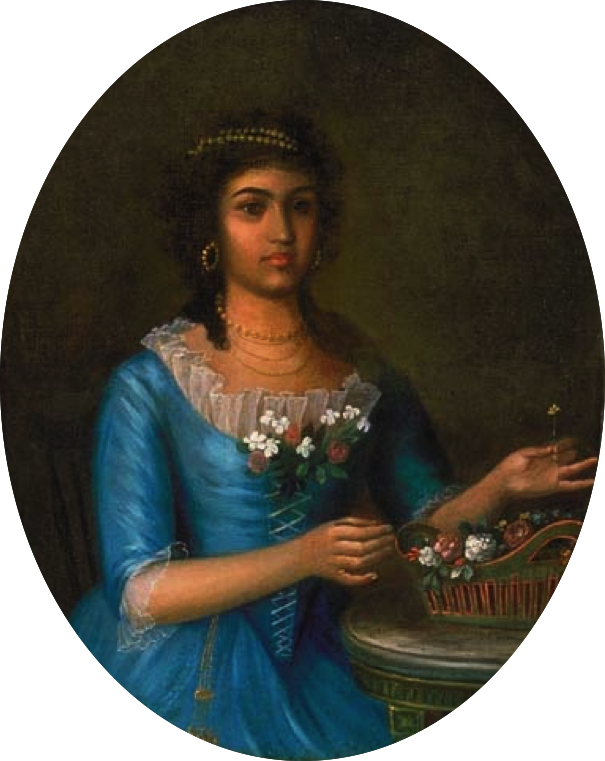
Pandely's grandmother Marianne Céleste Dragon

Pandely was born on his father's plantation. His father's name was Paul Pandely he was of English and Greek descent. Pandely's grandmother Elizabeth English was of royal descent and part of the House of Stuart. Pandely's mother Euphrosine Dimitry was also Greek and the eldest daughter of Andrea Dimitry and Marianne Celeste Dragon an interracial couple. George's grandmother and family passed as white. The family encountered countless instances of racism throughout the 19th century. Creoles of color were persecuted by strict laws that disallowed holding public office and owning property. Passing as white was a legal solution.

Marianne Celeste Dragon's marriage records indicate that she was white. The family faced constant race-related legal battles in the 1830s the Forstall sisters Pauline and Josephine brought Marianne to court because of some property she inherited from the Forstall family. A woman of color named Marianne inherited the property, not a white woman. The Forstall sisters wanted the white woman to return the property but the court sided with Marianne allowing her to keep the property and white status, ruling that the family had been in "possession of the right" to be categorized as a person not born of Negro extraction.

Pandely was educated by his father Paul Pandely and his uncles Alexander Dimitry and Micheal Dracos Dimitry. He spoke several languages and from a young age aspired to hold public office. His uncle Alexander Dimitry was Louisiana Superintendent of Public Education from 1847 to 1849. Pandely was a teacher in public school for two years. By the age of 21, Pandely was selected as a census taker in 1850 for the Third Municipality. Around the same period, he was a member of the Sons of Temperance. Pandely married his first cousin Marie Francoise Virginia Ernestine Martainville on December 21, 1852. She was the daughter of Marie Francesca Athenais Dimitry. Her son Ernest Lagarde was a writer and professor.

== Pandelly Affair ==
On March 28, 1853, Pandely ran for the position of assistant alderman a role similar to a city council member. He was elected to the office but two weeks later a citizen named Victor Wiltz accused him of not meeting the qualifications to hold public office. Pandely was accused of being of African descent. It was not legal for people of African descent to hold public office in New Orleans. A special inquiry was held to determine if the accusations were true.

By the summer of 1853, the race issue had not concluded and the Committee on Elections appointed by the board permitted Pandely to become an assistant alderman. Charges were brought against him asserting that his family originated from the Congo region. Some members of the board of assistant alderman were outraged by the accusation while others believed it. A special committee of seven members of the board was appointed to investigate. After the committee was appointed to examine Pandely was issued an injunction from the Fourth District Court restraining the committee from proceeding with the investigation of his heritage. P. E. Wiltz (possibly Pierre Evariste Wiltz), Victor Wiltz, and others published a damaging article in the New Orleans Daily Crescent on August 4, 1853, disclosing damaging family records proving that George was of African descent. Pandely responded by claiming his family was of Native American descent. A woman related to Pandely pleaded with Wiltz to rescind his allegations but he claimed he did not harbor any personal animosity towards Pandely nor the Dimitry Family. Wiltz also claimed he never saw Pandely until he was pointed out in a company of Firemen. Wiltz did not want the family to involve themselves in politics because it was not acceptable social practice. In Wiltz' view people of African descent should not take part in politics.

By October 26, 1853, the case was now also entitled The Great Pandely Case. Several court cases were initiated by Pandely namely George Pandely vs. Jesse Gilmore et al. and others. After the publication of the family records and genealogical background in August 1853 the Fourth District Court dissolved its injunction and Pandely appealed to the Supreme Court against the dissolution of the injunction. The Fourth District Court listened to the group of men that published the family background and decided to allow the board of assistant alderman to choose how to handle the Pandely issue. By November 4, 1853, Pandely resigned from his seat as assistant alderman after holding the office for about seven months. Three days later Pandely filed a civil suit asking for damages of 20,000 dollars because of slander against his social status.

By February 1854, a civil suit entitled Pandelly v. Wiltz (1854) jeopardized the entire Dimitry Family's social status. Crowds of citizens flocked to the court building each day to watch the trial. The trial was also published in the local newspapers but eventually, the issue made national headlines, and the entire country from New York to Washington D.C and other parts of the country discovered the Dimitry Family's heritage. The court lasted from February 1 to 14. Several witnesses came and gave accounts about the family's heritage and racial background. Witnesses recounted in one instance prominent members of the Dimitry family were removed from a ball because people of African descent were not admitted. In another instance, Mr. Dimitry and some of the Dimitry children were present in the courtroom at the examination while one of the witnesses Bernard Marigny entered the room and loudly said in French: "Quoi! II y a des negres ici!" (What! There are Blacks in here!).

Mr. Dimitry and the children completely embarrassed fled the courtroom. Alexander Dimitry's school in Raymond, Mississippi dropped from 50 students to 2 students at the onset of the Wiltz allegations. At the end of the trial, Pandely won the civil suit maintaining his social status but was not awarded the damages. Three similar cases were Cauchoix v. Dupuy (1831), Bollumet v. Phillips (1842), and Dobard et al. v. Nunez (1851) dealing with race.

After these cases, the Dimitry family decided to claim descent from a fictitious, Native American chief's daughter of the Alibamu tribe named Malanta Talla to maintain their social status. Pandely's real grandmother and great-grandmother were not of Native American descent. His great-grandmother was a former slave named Marie Françoise Chauvin Beaulieu de Montplaisir. She was the daughter of a slave named Marianne Lalande. Both slaves belonged to Mr. Charles Daprémont de La Lande, a member of the Superior Council. Historian Charles Gayarré continually insulted the Dimitry family and the entire Creole population due to evidence of African descent.

== Later life ==
In 1855, Pandely became a court clerk after the Pandelly Affair working for Judge Lugenbuhl's Court in the Third District. After several years Pierre Severe Wiltz appointed Pandely deputy clerk for the Second District under Judge Philip Hickory Morgan. Pandely's position was minute clerk. Pandely also became the superintendent of Pontchartrain Railroad in 1859.

At the onset of the American Civil War in 1861, Governor Thomas Overton Moore appointed Pandely Colonel of the Militia on the side of the Rebellion against the duly elected federal government. Pandely did not serve in battle but because he was in control of the Pontchartrain Railroad he oversaw the transportation of supplies for Confederate forces. By early 1868, because there was political turmoil in the South and federal troops were in control of the Southern states Pandely's name was added to the nomination for assistant alderman for New Orleans. On April 17, 1868, John P. Baker publicly withdrew his name as candidate in favor of Pandely. Pandely was elected to the same office of assistant alderman with no racial resistance. That summer he was also listed in newspapers as New Orleans recorder and the elected assistant city attorney was his brother-in-law Frank Michinard. The next year Pandely won reelection and by the summer of 1869, he was elected president of the board of assistant alderman. He was in the office of assistant alderman from 1868 until 1870.

Pandely continued his career as superintendent of the Pontchartrain Railroad until the early 1870s and his cousin Theodore John Dimitry was also listed as assistant superintendent while Randolph Natili was assistant freight broker. Around this period, he was also listed as president and superintendent of Morgan's Louisiana and Texas Railroad both companies were owned by Charles Morgan.

Pandely was also a delegate of the eighth ward of New Orleans at the state convention in 1879. He resigned his position as superintendent of the railroad company in 1883 because that same year at the age of 53 he was a partner in the iron business entitled Whitney Iron Works Company. Charles A. Whitney was the son-in-law of railway magnate Charles Morgan. Charles A. Whitney's sons along with Pandely, and Newell Tilton founded the Whitney Iron Works Company and Pandely was the president. Pandely died at 65 in New Orleans with distinction.

== Family ==
Pandely and his wife the former Ernestine Martainville had eight children. Only two lived until adulthood, both were named Laura. His firstborn, Laura number one was born on Sept. 4, 1855, and married Arthur de Roaldes, physician and surgeon. She died on May 9, 1874. The second Laura was born on April 9, 1875, she survived and married Alfred Taylor Pattison on December 16, 1890. About seven months after Laura's birth Pandely's wife Ernestine Pandely died on November 23, 1875, at 43.

== See also ==
- P. B. S. Pinchback
- Oscar Dunn

== Bibliography ==
- Poor, Henry V. (1870). Manual of the Railroads of the United States 1870-1871 Volume 3. New York, NY: H.V. & H.W. Poor.
- Christophe, Landry (August 18, 2018). "In Louisiana Creole Families 164 Marriages 328 Spouses" (PDF). Louisiana Historic & Cultural Vistas. Archived (PDF) from the original on February 9, 2023.
- Thompson, Shirley Elizabeth (2009). Exiles at Home The Struggle to Become American in Creole New Orleans. Cambridge, MA: Harvard University Press. ISBN 9780674023512.
- Tucker, Susan (2016). City of Remembering: A History of Genealogy in New Orleans. Jackson, MI: University Press of Mississippi. ISBN 9781496806222.
- Broyard, Bliss (2007). One Drop My Father's Hidden Life A Story of Race and Family Secrets. New York, New York: Little Brown and Company. ISBN 9780316019736.
- Chambers, William (1854). Things as They are in America. Philadelphia, PA: Lippincott, Grambo & Company.
- Foretia, Crystal (April 5, 2023). The Color of Intimacy: Marriage, Passing, and the Legal Strategies of Afro-Creole Women in Antebellum New Orleans (PDF) (Thesis). New York, New York: Columbia University Department of History. Archived (PDF) from the original on July 9, 2023.
- Pecquet du Bellet, Louise (1907a). Some Prominent Virginia Families. Vol. 4. Lynchburg, VA: J. P. Bell Company (Incorporated).
- Pecquet du Bellet, Louise (1907). Some Prominent Virginia Families. Vol. 3. Lynchburg, VA: J. P. Bell Company Incorporated.
- Maddox, Joseph H. (August 4, 1853a). "Evidence of Lineage The Pandelly Affair". New Orleans Daily Crescent, Volume 6, No. 129. New Orleans, Louisiana: New Orleans Daily Crescent. p. 3, col. 2. Archived (PDF) from the original on August 25, 2023. "The Pandelly Affair"
- Livingston, John (1859). Livingston's United States Law Register, and Official Directory. New York, N.Y.: John A. Gray Printer and Stereotyper.
- Cohen, Hyman E.; Cohen, Aaron Soria (1855). Cohen's New Orleans Directory Including Jefferson City, Gretna, Carrollton, Algiers, and McDonogh. New Orleans, Louisiana: Printed by the Office of the Picayune.
- Lobdell, James Louis; Batchelor, J.C. (1884). Proceedings of the M. W. Grand Lodge of the State of Louisiana, Free and Accepted Masons Seventy Second Annual Grand Communication. New Orleans, Louisiana: A.W. Hyatt Stationer and Printer.
- Roy, William F. (1912). Souvenir Program St. Maurice Church Fair Held at Friscoville Park, St. Bernard Parish April 27-28-29-1912. New Orleans, Louisiana: St. Maurice Church.
- Wilkinson, Joseph B. (1890). Wilkinsons̓ Report on Diffusion and Mill Work in the Louisiana Sugar Harvest of 1889-90 (Feb 22, 1890). New Orleans, Louisiana: Brandao & Gill Book and Job Printers.
- Maddox, Joseph H. (August 4, 1853). "Evidence of Lineage The Pandelly Affair". New Orleans Daily Crescent, Volume 6, No. 129. New Orleans, Louisiana: New Orleans Daily Crescent. p. 3, col. 2. Archived (PDF) from the original on August 25, 2023. "The Pandelly Affair"
