= John Bull Smith Dimitry =

American author

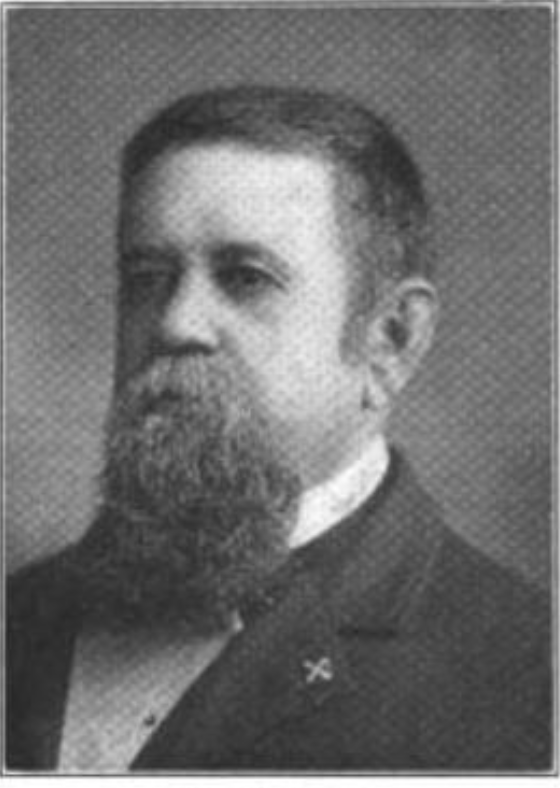
- Born: December 27, 1835; Washington, DC
- Died: September 7, 1901 (aged 65); New Orleans, LA
- Resting place: Metairie Cemetery
- Education: Georgetown University
- Occupations: Professor; Author
- Spouse: Adelaide Stuart Dimitry (m. 1871–1901)
- Parents: Alexander Dimitry (father); Mary Powell Mills Dimitry (mother)
- Relatives: Marianne Celeste Dragon; Michel Dragon; Ernest Lagarde; Charles Patton Dimitry
- Family: Dimitry Family (Creoles)
- Military career
- Allegiance: Confederate States of America
- Branch: Confederate States Army
- Rank: Color Guard
- Unit: Crescent City Native Guards
- Conflicts: Battle of Shiloh

John Bull Smith Dimitry (December 27, 1835 – September 7, 1901) was an American author, professor, and Confederate soldier. Despite his mixed heritage (octoroon), he is one of the few people of color venerated by the Confederacy. As the son of the author Alexander Dimitry, John was selected to write the Confederate Military History around the same period as Plessy v. Ferguson. John wrote for several news publications and published several of his own books.

John was born in Washington D.C. while his father worked as the principal clerk for the Southwest postal department. The family moved to New Orleans when he was a young age. His father was a notable author and heavily involved in education. He was appointed superintendent of public education in the state of Louisiana from 1847 to 1854. John was raised in a highly educated household and his father was a prominent member of that community. The Dimitry family endured some hardships as people of color due to their positions in the local community. His first cousin George Pandelly was involved in an incident dealing with his African heritage in the 1850s.

By the 1860s, John and other prominent members of the family participated in the American Civil War fighting for the Confederacy. Afterward, he wrote for the New Orleans Times in the mid-1860s early 1870s. He was a professor at the Colegio Caldas Barranquilla, Colombia during the mid-1870s and by the 1880s he wrote for The New York Mail Express for ten years in New York City. He was honored by the Association of the Army of Tennessee which he was an honorary member. He was awarded $500 by the Swinton Story Teller for his short story Le Tombeau Blanc. He died at 65 years in New Orleans, LA.

== Early life ==
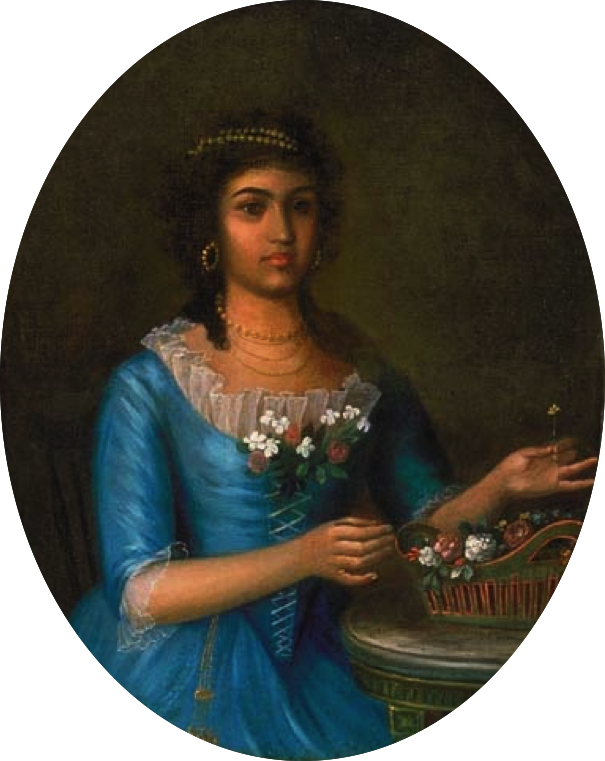
John's grandmother Marianne Céleste Dragon

John was born in Washington D.C. on December 27, 1835. He was the son of Mary Powell Mills and Creole diplomat Alexander Dimitry. His mother's father was Robert Mills. He was known for building the Washington Monument. His grandmother was Marianne Celeste Dragon. John spent his early life in Washington D.C. where his father was the principal clerk for the Southwest postal department. The family remained in Washington until the 1840s. John was educated in College Hill, Mississippi at Saint Charles Parish a school established by his father who was also the dean. Around the same period, his father was the first person of color appointed superintendent of public education in the state of Louisiana from 1847 to 1854. His brother was also a notable author, Charles Patton Dimitry.

In 1853, John's first cousin George Pandely was running for a seat on the Board of Assistant Aldermen, the position was responsible for urban infrastructure in New Orleans including streets and sidewalks similar to a city councilman. Pandelly won the election and weeks after an accusation was brought against Pandelly by Victor Wiltz. Wiltz accused Pandelly and his family of being of African descent. People of African descent were not allowed to hold public office. Pandelly resigned his elected position after seven months due to pressure from the mayor's office and his peers. Pandelly took his opponent Victor Wiltz to court for slander in the legal case Pandelly v. Wiltz (1854) because Wiltz accused Pandelly's grandmother of having African ancestry to discredit his public position as assistant alderman. The case was dismissed Pandelly won but did not receive financial compensation, but the Pandely Affair inspired later generations to invent a new genealogy for themselves in which they claimed descent from a mythical, possibly invented Indian princess of the Alibamu tribe named Malanta Talla.

The incident disrupted the family's social identity. At the onset of the affair Alexander Dimitry’s school went from 50 students to 2 but five years later he became the first person of color to hold the position of U.S. Ambassador of Costa Rica & Nicaragua. Initially, John worked in the office of United States Attorney General Caleb Cushing and eventually became the secretary of legation to the U.S. Ambassador of Costa Rica & Nicaragua during his father's tenure from (1859 - 1861). Around the same period, he also attended Georgetown along with his brother Charles Patton Dimitry.

== Civil War ==
During the onset of the American Civil War, most of his Creole family participated on the side of the Confederacy. His brother Alexander Godgrand Dimitry died in a battle near Germantown, Maryland. He was part of the Eighteenth Virginia Cavalry C.S.A. Their father Alexander was chief clerk to the Postmaster General of the Confederacy. John was a private in Captain George Graham's company. The military group later became known as Company C and the color company of the Crescent City Native Guards. John was the Colour guard of the regiment he was a private. The color guard was made up of a "Color Sergeant" carrying the National Colours and served as the unit commander colour bearer. He was accompanied by two colour escorts carrying rifles and/or sabres. John was one of the escorts.

The regiment took an active part in the Battle of Shiloh in southwestern Tennessee. During the second day battle, the Crescent Regiment supported the fifth company. The leaders were Union General Ulysses S. Grant and Confederate General Albert Sidney Johnston along with his second Confederate commander General P. G. T. Beauregard who later replaced him. The company was under attack and taking artillery fire. The Union troops were vastly superior and outnumbered the Confederate forces. The regiment pulled back but Captain George H. Graham and other members of Company C and the Louisiana Guards Company D of New Orleans including John did not hear the order to fall back and therefore faced the advancing forces. The color sergeant and two of the color guards were killed and two of the guards were wounded. John and his Creole first cousin Ernest Lagarde were trying to take Captain Graham to safety because Graham was shot in his chest by a mini ball. The captain was shot a second time and instantly killed falling into John's arms on April 6, 1862. Moments later John was shot in his hip. John was discharged from the Confederate Army and joined his father at the Post Master General's office. He replaced his father as chief clerk to the Postmaster General. His father became the Assistant Postmaster General of the Confederacy.

== Later life ==
In 1865, John became dramatic and literary editor of the New Orleans Times, and two years later in 1867 John and his brother Charles Patton Dimitry both received master's degrees from Georgetown University. Charles became a notable author writing the novel The House in Balfour-street. In 1869 John traveled to Europe as a journalist some of the countries he visited were Spain and England. He continued his work with the New Orleans Times and by February 7, 1871, he married Adelaide Stuart Dimitry. The couple moved to Colombia in 1874 where John was a professor of French and English at the Colegio Caldas Barranquilla. He also worked as a translator for the American Embassy. John and his family returned to New Orleans in 1876 and he published a textbook entitled Lessons in the History of Louisiana. The book was used by different schools in the state. By 1880, John went North and was associated with newspapers in Washington, Philadelphia, and New York. He wrote for The Mail and Express in New York from 1881 to 1889. By the year 1888 he translated Whose Famous Deeds Are Recorded in the Ancient Chronicles of François Rabelais from French and wrote Atahualpa's Curtain.

During the 1890s he returned to the South and began to prepare information for the memoir of Jefferson Davis in collaboration with Mrs. Jefferson Davis. In 1894 he wrote Le Tombeau Blanc and was awarded $500 by the Swinton Story Teller for the short story. One year later, he briefly taught at Montgomery College, Virginia. Around the same period, Homer Plessy a similar Creole to John was engaged in the incident that led to Plessy v. Ferguson. The incident sent shockwaves throughout the Creole community exposing the old families to the horrors of Jim Crow laws. Towards the end of the 1890s, the Creole writer was selected to complete the Confederate Military History which was published in 1899. John also wrote the epitaphs on Henry Watkins Allen, Albert Sidney Johnston, Stonewall Jackson, Edgar Allan Poe, Charlotte Temple, Charles Sumner, Jefferson Davis, and the Confederate Flag. John also finished a five-act historical drama entitled The Queens Letters. He died in 1901 at 65 years old, and his wife died ten years later in 1911.

== Family ==
John Bull Smith Dimitry derived his name from a mixture of his great-great-grandfather American Revolutionary War General John Bull and his great-grandfather Major General John Smith both of these relatives were from his mother's side. His great-grandfather from his father's side Michel Dragon also served in the American Revolution. John was the oldest of ten children. His brothers and sisters included: Charles Patton Dimitry, Eliza Virginia Mills Dimitry, Mary Elizabeth Lynn Dimitry, Alexander Godgrand Dimitry, Mathilde Fortier Dimitry, Robert Mills Dimitry, Robert Andrea Dimitry, Thomas Dabney Dimitry, and Ernest Alexander Lagarde Dimitry. John and his older brother Charles did not have any children.

== Literary works ==
Books and Articles authored by John Bull Smith Dimitry
Date	Title
1877	Lessons in the History of Louisiana
1888	Whose Famous Deeds Are Recorded in the Ancient Chronicles of François Rabelais (translation from French)
1888	Onatoga's Sacrifice
1888	Atahualpa's Curtain
1889	Did Stonewall Jackson Inspire Victory?
1894	Le Tombeau Blanc
1899	Confederate Military History

== Bibliography ==
- Duke, Basil; Barlow, Florence (August 1901). "The Lost Cause A Confederate War Record John Dimitry". The Lost Cause. 5 (1). Louisville, KY.
- Johnson, Rossiter; Brown, John Howard, eds. (1904). "John Bull Smith Dimitry". The Twentieth Century Biographical Dictionary of Notable Americans. Cowan-Erich. Vol. 3. Boston, MA: The Biographical Society.
- Fitzgerald, Michael (March 2007). "John Bull Smith Dimitry papers, 1848-1922, 1943 (bulk 1857-1922)". Durham, North Carolina: Duke University Libraries. Archived from the original on October 9, 2020.
- Chambers, William (1854). Things as They are in America. Philadelphia, PA: Lippincott, Grambo & Company.
- Foretia, Crystal (April 5, 2023). The Color of Intimacy: Marriage, Passing, and the Legal Strategies of Afro-Creole Women in Antebellum New Orleans (PDF) (Thesis). New York, New York: Columbia University Department of History. Archived from the original (PDF) on July 9, 2023.
- Maxwell, W.J. (1916). General Register of Georgetown University. Washington, D.C.: Georgetown University Press.
- Cunningham, S.A. (February 1903). "Confederate Veteran John Dimitry". The Lost Cause. 11 (2). Nashville, TN: Methodist Publishing House.
- Herringshaw, Thomas William, ed. (1901). "John Bull Smith Dimitry". Herringshaw's Encyclopedia of American Biography of the Nineteenth Century. Chicago, IL: American Publishers Association.
- Alderman, Edwin Anderson; Smith, Charles Alphonso; Metcalf, John Calvin, eds. (1901). "John Bull Smith Dimitry". Library of Southern Literature Biographical Dictionary of Authors Presented by Lucian Lamar Knight. Vol. 15. Atlanta, GA: The Martin and Hoyt Company.
- Fiske, John; Wilson, James Grant, eds. (1888). "John Bull Smith Dimitry". Appletons' Cyclopaedia of American Biography. Crane-Grimshaw. Vol. 2. New York, NY: D. Appleton and Company.
- Beach, Frederick Converse; Rines, George Edwin; Dole, Nathan Haskell; Roe, Edward Thomas; Copeland, Thomas Campbell, eds. (1888). "John Bull Smith Dimitry". The Encyclopedia Americana A General Dictionary of the Arts and Sciences, Literature, History, Biography, Geography, Etc. Daae - Emerson. Vol. 6. New York, NY: The Americana Company.
- Pecquet du Bellet, Louise (1907a). Some Prominent Virginia Families. Vol. 4. Lynchburg, VA: J. P. Bell Company (Incorporated).
- Pecquet du Bellet, Louise (1907). Some Prominent Virginia Families. Vol. 3. Lynchburg, VA: J. P. Bell Company Incorporated.
- Maddox, Joseph H. (August 4, 1853). "Evidence of Lineage The Pandelly Affair". New Orleans Daily Crescent, Volume 6, No. 129. New Orleans, Louisiana: New Orleans Daily Crescent. p. 3, col. 2. Archived (PDF) from the original on August 25, 2023. "The Pandelly Affair"
