= Ernest Lagarde =

Louisiana Creole academic

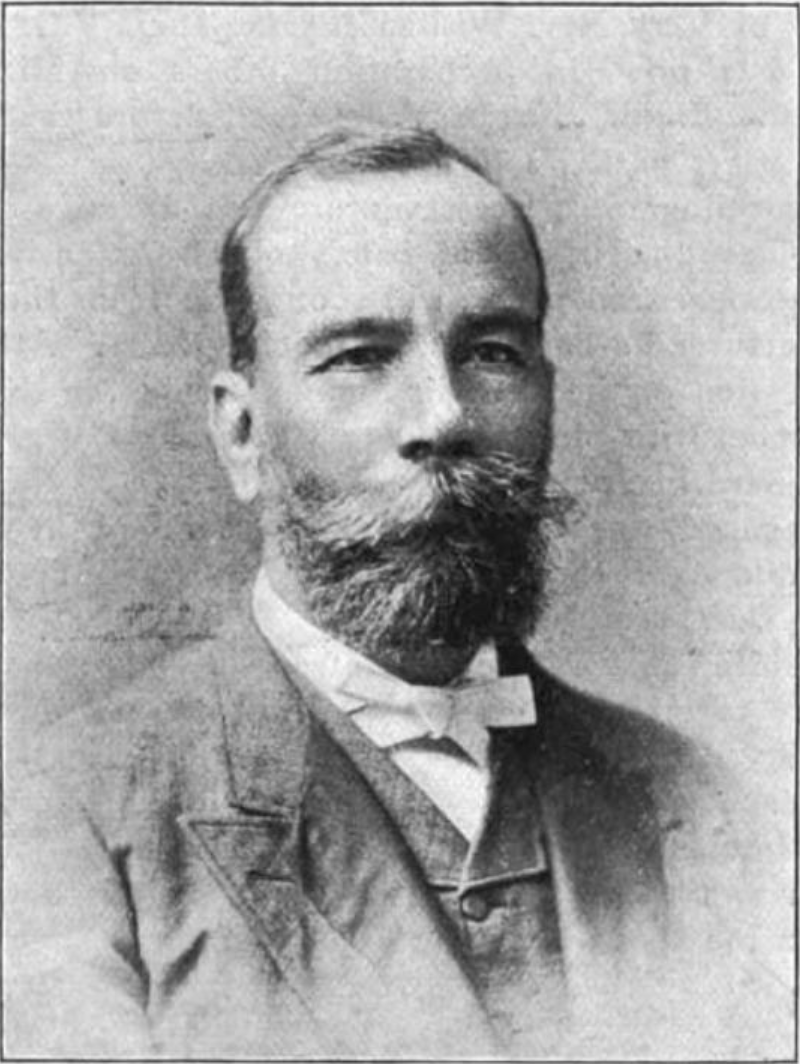
- Born: September 4, 1836; New Orleans, Louisiana
- Died: October 25, 1914 (aged 78); Emmitsburg, Maryland
- Resting place: Saint Anthony's Shrine Cemetery
- Occupations: Professor; Author
- Title: LL.D.
- Spouse: Anne Angelique Leonie Laforque (m. 1861–1914)
- Children: Ernest Lagarde Jr.
- Parents: Jean Baptist Lagarde (father); Marie Francesca Athenais Dimitry (mother)
- Relatives: Marianne Celeste Dragon; Michel Dragon; Charles Patton Dimitry; John Bull Smith Dimitry; George Pandely
- Family: Dimitry Family (Creoles)

Academic background
- Education: University of Louisiana; Georgetown University
- Influences: Alexander Dimitry

Academic work
- Discipline: Literature; Modern Languages
- Institutions: Petersburg Female College; Randolph–Macon College; Mount St. Mary's University
- Main interests: Shakespeare

Ernest Lagarde (September 4, 1836 – October 25, 1914) was a mixed race Creole author, journalist, professor, publisher, and linguist. He spoke many languages including Greek, following his Greek-American heritage. Lagarde was a member of the prominent Creole Dimitry family of New Orleans. The family was involved in a large number of controversial incidents that involved racism. He was a faculty member at Mount St. Mary's University for over 45 years. He served as chairman of the university's Department of Modern Languages and Literature. Lagarde worked for several newspapers and also wrote several scholarly books, including one on William Shakespeare entitled Shakespeare A Lecture. He started a newspaper for Mount Saint Mary's College called The Mountain Echo.

Lagarde was born to parents Jean Baptist Lagarde and Marie Francesca Athenais Dimitry. His father died while Lagarde was a young child, and so his uncle Alexander Dimitry took on an important role in Lagarde's upbringing. Lagarde initially studied law and medicine at the University of Louisiana (now known as Tulane University), although he switched to journalism and later teaching. He received both a bachelor's degree and master's degree from Georgetown University. After 1869, Lagarde became a tenured professor at Mount St. Mary's University.

Lagarde built an elaborate estate one mile south of Mount Saint Mary's College called the Inglewood Estate where he raised his children. The house has remained well-preserved. College of Saint Francis Xavier (New York) conferred on Lagarde a Doctor of Laws (LL.D.) as an honorary degree. Lagarde was a member of the Modern Language Association of America, the National Society of the Sons of the American Revolution, and the Louisiana Historical Society. He was also a member of the Phonetic and Philological Association of the United States which honored him during the 1876 centennial of the United States. Lagarde's son Ernest Lagarde Jr. was on the commission of the Panama Canal. His daughter Alice Lagarde married Italian-American composer Giuseppe Ferrata. Lagarde died in Emmitsburg, Maryland, and had a well-attended funeral.

== Early life ==
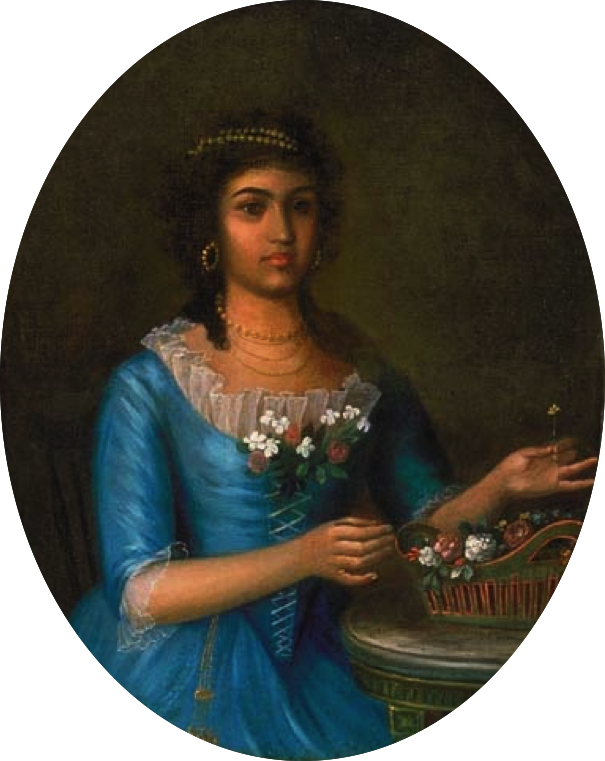
Lagarde's grandmother Marianne Céleste Dragon

Ernest Lagarde was born in New Orleans to his father Jean Baptist Lagarde, who was of French descent, and to his mother Marie Francesca Athenais Dimitry. Jean Baptist Lagarde was his mother's second husband of three husbands. Scholar Alexander Dimitry was Ernest Lagarde's uncle, and he had an important role in Lagarde's childhood, having educated Ernest Lagarde, Charles Patton Dimitry, John Bull Smith Dimitry, and other family members.

=== Family racial encounters ===
The Creole community of New Orleans suffered significant cultural and racial oppression, which eventually became a part of everyday life, and Lagarde's family had several racial encounters that were important in his life or upbringing.

Lagarde's grandmother Marianne Céleste Dragon was listed as a white person on public records including marriage records, due to the family's high social status within the Creole community. At the time, people of color in the region were persecuted by strict laws, and being listed legally as white was desirable. The grandmother was brought to court in the 1830s by the sisters Pauline Forstall and Josephine Forstall because the grandmother had inherited property from the Forstall family. The sisters contested the inheritance on racial grounds. The court eventually sided with Dragon, allowing her to keep her property and white status, ruling that the family as a whole had been in possession of the right to be categorized as a person not born of Negro heritage.

Another incident involving the Dimitry family included Lagarde's sister's husband George Pandely. Pandely was running for a position on the Board of Assistant Aldermen, a position similar to a city councilman. The position was responsible for urban infrastructure in New Orleans, including streets and sidewalks. Pandely's opponent, Victor Wiltz, accused Pandely's grandmother of having African ancestry in order to discredit Pandely's candidacy. Pandely won the election, which was in 1853, but resigned the office seven months later because of the public pressure brought on by Wiltz's accusations. Pandely took Wiltz to court for slander, and the incident led to the court case entitled Pandelly v. Wiltz (1854). The case was dismissed in favor of Pandely, but there was no financial award. Three similar cases were Cauchoix v. Dupuy (1831), Bollumet v. Phillips (1842), and Dobard et al. v. Nunez (1851), dealing with race. Crowds of spectators stood outside the court in the wintertime trial. Some of the Dimitry children attended the proceedings along with Alexander Dimitry. Lagarde was seventeen years old at the time. Children of the Dimitry family witnessed the extent of racial oppression, and in one instance, a member of the Dimitry family was racially insulted and fled the courtroom along with the children. Because of the large amount of news coverage, Dimitry's school went from having fifty students to only five. This incident became known as the Pandely Affair.

The Pandely Affair motivated later generations of the Dimitry family to create a new genealogy in which they claimed descent from a mythical, Indian princess of the Alibamu tribe named Malanta Talla. The case is an example of ethnocide in which the African heritage was ignored. However, New Orleans records indicate that both their grandmother, Marianne Céleste Dragon, and the great-grandmother were not of Indian descent. Their great-grandmother was a former slave named Marie Françoise Chauvin Beaulieu de Montplaisir. She belonged to Charles Daprémont de La Lande, a member of the Superior Council and she is listed as mulatto.

== Education and young adulthood ==
Despite enduring racial atrocities when he was in his teenage years, Lagarde was committed to personal advancement and his education. He remained heavily influenced by his uncle, the scholar Alexander Dimitry, and continued to be close to him. In homage, Dimitry named one of his children Ernest Lagarde Dimitry.

By the late 1850s, the family had survived the Pandely Affair, and Lagarde became the Librarian of the Mercantile Library Association in New Orleans, working there from 1857 to 1860. Around 1859–1860, he briefly served as deputy clerk for the United States District Court (Eastern District of Louisiana). Lagarde also attended classes at the University of Louisiana, studying law and medicine. He then decided to study to become a journalist, which was at the same time as his first cousin Charles Patton Dimitry did so. Beginning in 1857, he wrote for a New Orleans newspaper entitled The Magnate. He also started a political campaign publication named The Sentinel, which he published together with his cousin Charles P. Dimitry.

Lagarde married Anne Angelique Leonie Laforque on February 11, 1861. Her parents were M. Laforque and Angelique Langlois, both of French heritage.

== Career ==
During the American Civil War, Lagarde joined the Crescent Regiment under Colonel Marshall J. Smith. He was sent to Richmond, Virginia, to serve in the ordnance bureau as a clerk to Colonel Georgas. His uncle Alexander Dimitry, Charles Patton Dimitry, and John Bull Smith Dimitry were also in Richmond at the time. While he was at the ordnance bureau, Lagarde published a monthly magazine in Richmond under the partnership name of Ernest Lagarde and Co. The editor was W.H. Burwell, and the magazine was entitled The Age. While in Richmond, he also edited the evening edition of the Richmond Whig. After Richmond surrendered to Union forces, Lagarde published the Richmond Bulletin along with Charles Patton Dimitry and George C. Weddenburn who was also from New Orleans.

At the end of the Civil War, Lagarde was appointed professor of modern languages at Randolph Macon College then located in Mecklenburg County, Virginia. Lagarde then moved to Petersburg, Virginia, where he remained for one year when he worked as editor of the Petersburg Press. At the same time, Lagarde taught at the Petersburg Female College.

Lagarde earned both a bachelor's and master's degrees from Georgetown University between 1866 and 1869. His cousins Charles Patton Dimitry and John Bull Smith Dimitry also received degrees from Georgetown around the same period. In 1869, he was elected Chair of Modern Languages and English Literature at Mount Saint Mary College, a position he held for the rest of his life. Lagarde was honored by the College of Saint Francis Xavier (New York), which conferred upon him a degree of Doctor of Laws (LL.D.).

In the 1890s, during his tenure at Mount Saint Mary College, Lagarde had a feud with another faculty member, composer Giuseppe Ferrata, because Ferrata wanted to marry his daughter Alice. Eventually, Lagarde consented to the marriage. Ferrata, a former student of Franz Liszt, later became a noted composer and pianist.

Lagarde had the opportunity to become a diplomat like his uncle, Alexander Dimitry. He was endorsed as Minister to San Salvador roughly one year prior to his death.

Lagarde died on October 25, 1914, at 78 years of age. Hundreds of people attended his funeral, and the pallbearers at his funeral were eight senior students from the college. His wife was still alive at the time of his death.

== Inglewood Estate ==
On August 31, 1880, Ernest and Leona Lagarde purchased a 13 acres (5.3 ha) parcel of land from Mathew and Mary Moran, the land that Lagarde then used to construct Inglewood Estate. It was one mile south of Mount St. Mary's University. Lagarde subsequently built Inglewood Estate on the land, and he lived there until his death in 1914. The home was built in the typical Victorian architectural style that was prevalent at the time in Emmitsburg, Maryland. Lagarde's construction included various outbuildings on the property. Lagarde published the school's first newspaper, The Mountain Echo, from his library at Inglewood Estate.

After Lagarde's death in 1914, the estate was rented to George and Blanch Wilhide and a Baltimore physician Dr. Martin, who used the estate as a summer home. By July 31, 1920, the estate was sold at a public auction for around US$4000. It was obtained by a Roman Catholic priest named Rev. John H. Echkenrode who used it as a boarding house in the 1930s. In 1939, the house was purchased by Leona C. Mercer who resided there until 1955. Then the estate was sold to Kenneth P. and Margaret Anders who owned it only until 1959 when it was purchased by Floyd Lewis. Lewis owned the property until 1977, and, during this period, the estate was declared a historical site by the Maryland Historical Trust. The current estate is about 7 acres (2.8 ha) in area. The address for Inglewood Estate is 15942 Saint Anthony Rd, Thurmont, MD 21788.

== Scholarly works ==
Books and Articles authored by Ernest Lagarde
Date	Title
1864	The Age
1873	A French Verb Book
1891	Shakespeare A Lecture
1899	The President and His Advisors
1904	Lessons Read to Senior English Class

== Bibliography ==
- Thompson, Shirley Elizabeth (2009). Exiles at Home The Struggle to Become American in Creole New Orleans. Cambridge, MA: Harvard University Press. ISBN 9780674023512.
- Tucker, Susan (2016). City of Remembering: A History of Genealogy in New Orleans. Jackson, MI: University Press of Mississippi. ISBN 9781496806222.
- Smith, James Power; Archer, Anderson; Christian, George L.; Mccabe, W. Gordon (October 1917). Southern Historical Society Papers XLII. Richmond, VA: The Southern Historical Society Society.
- Chambers, William (1854). Things as They are in America. Philadelphia, PA: Lippincott, Grambo & Company.
- Foretia, Crystal (April 5, 2023). The Color of Intimacy: Marriage, Passing, and the Legal Strategies of Afro-Creole Women in Antebellum New Orleans (PDF) (Thesis). New York, New York: Columbia University Department of History. Archived from the original (PDF) on July 9, 2023.
- Maxwell, W.J. (1916). General Register of Georgetown University. Washington, D.C.: Georgetown University Press.
- Pecquet du Bellet, Louise (1907a). Some Prominent Virginia Families. Vol. 4. Lynchburg, VA: J. P. Bell Company (Incorporated).
- Pecquet du Bellet, Louise (1907). Some Prominent Virginia Families. Vol. 3. Lynchburg, VA: J. P. Bell Company Incorporated.
- Herbermann, Chase; Cahalan, John E.; Wynne, John J. (1897). The College of St. Francis Xavier A Memorial and a Retrospect, 1847-1897. New York, NY: The Meany Printing Company.
- Eanes, Edward (1998). Giuseppe Ferrata Èmigrè Pianist and Composer. Lanham, Maryland: Scarecrow Press. ISBN 978-0-8108-3500-9.
- Patterson, Homer L. (1915). "Obituary Dr. Ernest Lagarde". The American Educational Review. Vol. 36, no. 2. New York, NY: American Educational Company.
- Galt, Sterling (October 30, 1914). "Professor Ernest Lagarde" (PDF). The Weekly Chronicle, Vol. 36, No. 28 (Emmitsburg, Maryland), Page 1. The Emmitsburg Chronicle and The Carroll Record. p. 1, col. 3. Archived (PDF) from the original on August 13, 2023.
- Bancroft, Fredrick (1898). Portrait and Biographical Record of the Sixth Congressional District, Maryland. New York, NY: Chapman Publishing Company.
- Walker, James; Doherty, Francis B (1898). "Authentic Sketches of Living Authors Ernest Lagarde". The Catholic World a Monthly Magazine of General Literature and Science. Vol. 66, no. 393. New York, NY: The Office of the Catholic World New York.
- Maddox, Joseph H. (August 4, 1853). "Evidence of Lineage The Pandelly Affair". New Orleans Daily Crescent, Volume 6, No. 129. New Orleans, Louisiana: New Orleans Daily Crescent. p. 3, col. 2. Archived (PDF) from the original on August 25, 2023. "The Pandelly Affair"
- Munday, George W. (1860). The Court of Claims submitted to the House of Representatives During the First Session of the Thirty-Sixth Congress. Washington D.C.: Thomas H. Ford Printer.
