= Le Meschacébé =

Le Meschacébé was a French-language newspaper in Louisiana that also carried some English-language content and eventually became an English-language newspaper. The title of the newspaper comes from the Mississippi River, referred to as Le Meschacébé in French.

== History ==
Hypolite Prudent deBautte, who wrote using the pseudonym Prudent d’Artly, established Le Meschacébé in St. John the Baptist Parish, as well as L’Avant Coureur (The Forerunner) in St. Charles Parish, publishing the first issues January 23, 1853. The papers carried legal notices for their respective parishes. After five years the publishing business was sold to Eugène Dumez and Ernest LeGendre.

Le Meschacébé included satires of Creole former slaves. It published African American folktales. It ran a cartoon October 19, 1918 of fall fashions in a store window display with male mannequins wearing army and navy uniforms and signage stating Uncle Sam, Furnisher of Liberty Men, Tailor. The October 15, 1921 issue described use of an "earth pipe" by people in South Africa smoking cannabis.

Eugène Dumez, who immigrated from France, edited the paper for 20 years up to his death. Lafcadio Hearn described him as the "ablest French editor in Louisiana" in a letter. Jean-Charles Houzeau was friendly with Dumez and sent articles to the paper from Jamaica. The paper became an English language paper.

Alexander Dimitry wrote for the paper.

Issues are extant and available online.
