= Marianne Celeste Dragon =

Creole landowner (1777–1856)

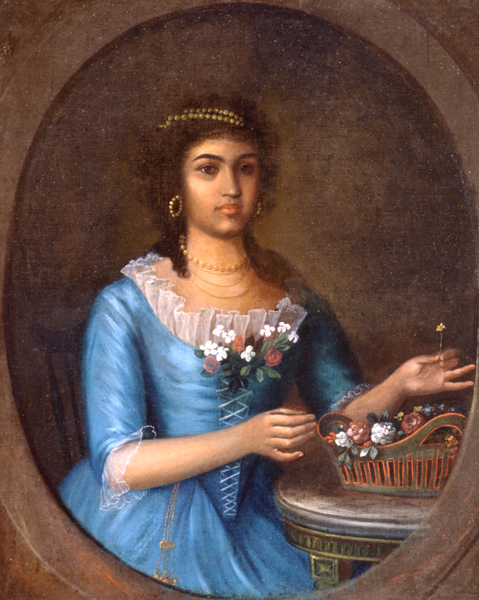
- Portrait of Marianne Celeste Dragon in 1795, painted by José Francisco de Salazar y Mendoza.
- Born: March 1, 1777; New Orleans, Spanish Louisiana
- Died: April 22, 1856 (aged 78); New Orleans, US
- Occupation: Entrepreneur
- Spouse: Andrea Dimitry (m. 1799; died in 1852)
- Children: Alexander Dimitry
- Parent: Michel Dragon
- Relatives: John Bull Smith Dimitry; Charles Patton Dimitry; Ernest Lagarde; George Pandely; Theodore John Dimitry Jr. Dracos Anthony Dimitry; Randolph Natili

Marie Celeste Dragon (1777–1856) was a prominent Creole of color landowner during the Spanish Louisiana period, also known for her portrait by José Francisco Xavier de Salazar y Mendoza. She was the wife of Andrea Dimitry; they were an interracial couple. Dragon passed neither as black or white due to her mixed ancestry. She was of Greek-French and African descent.

Her likeness has been featured in countless articles as representative of the creole community. She was on the cover of the book Exiles at Home The Struggle to Become American in Creole New Orleans by Shirley Elizabeth Thompson. Two of her creole children attended Georgetown. Her son Alexander Dimitry was the first person of color to attend Georgetown University and the first person of color to become a U.S. ambassador. He was ambassador to Costa Rica and Nicaragua. Her first daughter Euphrosyne married Paul Pandely. Paul's mother Elizabeth English are claimed to be a member of the English royal House of Stuart. Paul's father was of Greek descent.

== Early life ==
Marianne Dragon was born on March 1, 1777, in New Orleans, Spanish Louisiana. Her father was American Revolutionary War hero Michel Dragon. Dragon had migrated from the Greek city of Athens and arrived in New Orleans during the 1760s. Her mother was a former slave named Marie Françoise Chauvin Beaulieu de Montplaisir. She had belonged to Mr. Charles Daprémont de La Lande, a member of the Superior Council. Her family was of African descent. Records indicate that Marianne's parents were married, which was legally prohibited for an interracial couple.

Records also indicate that both Marianne's parents were slave owners. There are over 36 documented slave records clarifying that Dragon and his wife Françoise Chauvin Beaulieu de Monplaisir were planters. There are also many documented slave trades organized among individuals with the last name Monplaisir. Some are listed as nègres (in French "of Black African heritage") which is indicative of black slave ownership. Some, if not all, may have been related to Marie Françoise.

In 1795, a portrait was painted of the young creole Marianne by famous Mexican painter José Francisco Xavier de Salazar y Mendoza, documenting her appearance and physical characteristics. In marriage records, her mother was listed as a quadroon which is considered highly unlikely due to Marianne's complexion. Older baptismal records documented her mother's race as mulatto. Around the same period, Marianne met a Greek man named Andrea Dimitry. She wanted to marry him. It was against the law for people of two different races to marry at that time. Documents indicate that the priest Père Antoine read the marriage banns out loud at the ceremony. He was known for marrying interracial couples, and the wedding proceeded, but cautiously. Marianne was listed as white in marriage records to make it possible for her to legally marry Andrea. They were married in 1799. The couple had ten children.

== Marriage and children ==
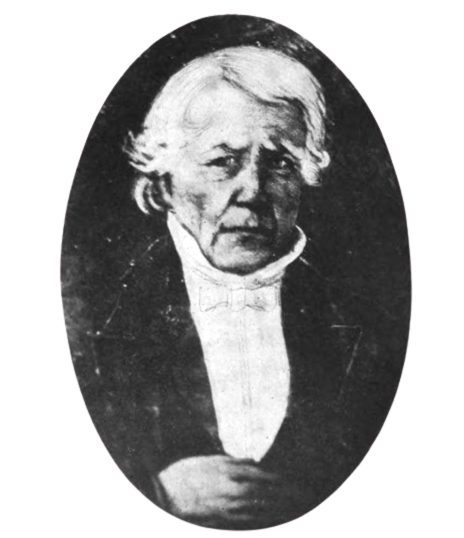
Andrea Dimitry, Marianne's husband, in old age

The Louisiana Purchase of 1803 transferred the Louisiana Territory to the United States, after which the Dimitry family became American citizens. The family is regarded by historians as among the oldest Creole families in New Orleans. Members of the family maintained an awareness of their Greek ancestry, which formed part of their broader cultural identity. Contemporary sources note the Greek origins of both Andrea Dimitry and Marianne Celeste Dragon, and their descendants were generally perceived as part of the citys Creole population.

Marriage patterns within the family reflected the cosmopolitan character of New Orleans society in the early nineteenth century, with many children marrying individuals of European origin. Family tradition holds that some members travelled to Greece in the 1830s in search of suitable spouses, although this claim cannot be independently verified. Their eldest daughter, Euphrosine Dimitry, married Paul Pandely. Pandelys mother, Elizabeth English, asserted a connection to the English royal House of Stuart, while his father was Greek. Their second daughter, Aimèe Manuella Dimitry, married Auguste Théodore Dietz on January 10, 1826, in New Orleans, he was born in Saint-Pierre-de-Maillé, Vienne department, France, on April 12, 1799 and died on June 13, 1870 in New Orleans, he was a pressman for the True American. The third child, the Creole author Alexander Dimitry, married Mary Powell Mills, a member of a prominent American family. Her father was the architect Robert Mills, designer of the Washington Monument. Alexander Dimitry later became an abolitionist, was the first person of colour to attend Georgetown University, and the first person of colour to serve as a United States ambassador.

The fourth child, Constantine Andrea Dimitry, died unmarried at the age of twenty-two in a drowning incident and was blind at the time of his death. The fifth child, John Baptiste Miguel Dracos Dimitry, married Caroline Sophia Powers, whose mother was French. Clino Angelica Dimitry married the Italian surgeon Giovanni Andrea Pieri, MD, who shared a name with the Italian revolutionary Giovanni Andrea Pieri associated with Giuseppe Mazzini and the Unification of Italy. Historical records indicate that one individual of this name died in France on March 13, 1858, after an attempted assassination of Napoleon III, while another Giovanni Pieri died on July 9, 1880. Both studied in France and were also known by the name Giuseppe, leading some historians to suggest they may have been the same person. The seventh child, Marie Francesca Athenais Dimitry, married three times, twice to French husbands and once to an American. The eighth child, Nicholas Theodore Dimitry, like his brother Alexander, attended Georgetown University but died at the age of twenty-one. Mathilde Elizabeth Theophanie Dimitry married Auguste Natili, an Italian physician from Pisa, representing the second Italian marriage into the family. The youngest child, Antoine Marie Dimitry, died unmarried. Collectively, these marriages resulted in descendants of Greek, Italian, French, English, and American backgrounds.

In 1811, the region experienced the largest slave revolt in United States history, occurring approximately thirty miles outside New Orleans. In the aftermath, attitudes toward free people of colour hardened among many white slaveholders, and territorial authorities introduced restrictive measures. Governor William C. C. Claiborne reduced the participation of free men of colour in the local militia, imposed curfews, and required special passes for people of colour. Free people of colour who owned slaves were also subject to increased scrutiny. By the 1830s, demands for clearer racial distinctions became more pronounced in Louisiana law and society, with segregation structured largely around legal status. Within this context, the Dimitry family emphasised education and social standing. Members of the family were multilingual, and Alexander Dimitry was noted for speaking eleven languages. By the 1860s, a recognisable Greek community had developed in New Orleans, including the establishment of a Greek Orthodox Church and the presence of a Greek consulate.

== Pandely Affair ==
In 1853, Marianne's grandson George Pandely ran for a seat on the Board of Assistant Aldermen, a municipal body responsible for urban infrastructure in New Orleans, including streets and sidewalks a position similar to a city councilman. He won the election but two weeks after Victor Wiltz accused him and his family of having African lineage. People of African lineage were not allowed to hold political office. After seven months in office, he resigned due to pressure from the mayor's office and his peers. In February 1854, a huge trial ensued when Pandelly took Victor Wiltz to court for slander and defamation of character in the case known as Pandelly v. Wiltz (1854). The case was dismissed, Pandelly won but did not receive financial compensation. The incident became known as the Pandely Affair and it inspired later generations to invent a new genealogy for themselves in which they claimed descent from a mythical, invented Indian princess of the Alibamu tribe named Malanta Talla.

The incident sent shockwaves throughout the elite family's social identity. Marianne's son Alexander Dimitry's school went from having 50 students to 2 and he was also publicly humiliated. The trial was made public in newspapers across the United States. Miraculously, five years later Alexander became the first person of color to hold the position of U.S. Ambassador to Costa Rica and Nicaragua. Marienne's grandchildren Ernest Lagarde, Charles Patton Dimitry, Virginia Dimitry Ruth and John Bull Smith Dimitry also became notable authors.

== Later life and death ==
Marianne inherited money from her father and later accused Andrea of mismanaging the estate. She took him to court and won a $27,000 settlement. The court siding with Marianne was uncommon because of her mixed-race heritage.

Marianne died on April 22, 1856, in New Orleans, Louisiana. Marianne was featured in the 2013 book Behind Closed Doors Art in the Spanish American Home, 1492-1898 By Mia L. Bagneris, Michael A. Brown, Suzanne L. Stratton-Pruitt. Her portrait was on the cover of the 2009 book Exiles at Home by Shirley Elizabeth Thompson.

== Notable relations ==
- John Bull Smith Dimitry
- Charles Patton Dimitry
- Elizabeth Virginia Dimitry Ruth
- Thomas Dabney Dimitry
- Dracos Anthony Dimitry
- George Pandely
- Ernest Lagarde
- Michael Dracos Dimitry (great-grandchild)
- Theodore John Dimitry Jr. (great-grandchild)
- Eddie Dyer (great great-child)

== See also ==
- Louisiana (New Spain)
- Marie Thérèse Coincoin

== Bibliography ==
- Pecquet du Bellet, Louise; Jaquelin, Edward; Jaquelin, Martha Carey (1907). Some Prominent Virginia Families. Vol. 4. Jamestown, VA: J. P. Bell Company (Incorporated).
- Bagneris, Mia L.; Brown, Michael A.; Stratton-Pruitt, Suzanne L. (2013). Behind Closed Doors Art in the Spanish American Home 1492-1898. Brooklyn, NY: The Monacelli Press. ISBN 9781580933650.
- Foretia, Crystal (April 5, 2023). The Color of Intimacy: Marriage, Passing, and the Legal Strategies of Afro-Creole Women in Antebellum New Orleans (PDF) (Thesis). New York, New York: Columbia University Department of History. Archived from the original (PDF) on July 9, 2023.
- Maddox, Joseph H. (August 4, 1853). "Evidence of Lineage The Pandelly Affair". New Orleans Daily Crescent, Volume 6, No. 129. New Orleans, Louisiana: New Orleans Daily Crescent. p. 3, col. 2. Archived (PDF) from the original on August 25, 2023. "The Pandelly Affair"
