= Mary Bushnell Williams =

American author, poet, translator

- Born: Mary Bushnell; 1826; Baton Rouge, Louisiana, U.S.
- Died: July 3, 1891 (aged 64–65)
- Resting place: Opelousas, Louisiana, U.S.
- Occupations: author; poet; translator
- Spouse: Josiah P. Williams (m. 1843)
- Children: 9
- Writing career
- Language: English

Mary Bushnell Williams (née, Bushnell; 1826 – July 3, 1891) was a Louisiana Creole American author, poet, and translator. She resided in Louisiana her entire life except for a brief period when she removed to Texas during the American Civil War. A pupil of Alexander Dimitry, her translations from different languages were admired, and her poems were held in high esteem. Besides poetry, she wrote sketches in prose.

== Early life and education ==
Mary (sometimes, "Marie") Bushnell was born in Baton Rouge, Louisiana, in 1826. Her father, Judge Charles Bushnell, a native of Boston, Massachusetts, came to Louisiana within a decade of the Louisiana Purchase. He married into a Creole family, one of the most prominent families of Baton Rouge, that settled in Louisiana under the Spanish regime. Judge Bushnell was a member of the bar of Louisiana. He also found time to cultivate his knowledge of literature.

Early in her life, Williams displayed a studious disposition. She studied under the linguist and teacher, Professor Alexander Dimitry. She was reportedly Dimitry's favourite pupil, and under his instruction, learned modern languages and developed an interest in literature.

== Career ==
Though Williams was occupied with the responsibilities of a wife and mother, this did not lessen her interest in literary pursuits. For her own amusement and that of a choice coterie of literary friends whom she frequently hosted, she became accustomed to weave together legends of Louisiana, both in prose and verse, which soon established her reputation in literary circles. She did not, however, fancy the plaudits of the world. For years, she refused to appear in print, but when at length, a few of her articles found their way into literary journals, she was acknowledged as a poet and a teacher.

Williams contributed to periodical literature, including, for years, to the New Orleans Sunday Times. Her poetry was admired, notably the verses entitled The Serfs of Chateney. Williams was translator of French, German, and Spanish literature. She published a translation from German, of Adelbert von Chamisso's “Man without a Shadow". In 1874, it was reported that Williams was working on a translation of Heine's poems from German, a new rendering of Goethe into English verse, and a collection of legends illustrating the history of Old Louisiana. She was the author of Tales and Legends of Louisiana, a lyrical poem.

== Personal life ==
In 1843, she married Josiah P. Williams, a planter of Rapides Parish, Louisiana, and they resided near Alexandria, Louisiana, on Red River of the South. Josiah Williams was a sugar planter and owned one of the largest sugar plantations in the state. His father, Archie P. Williams, was in his time one of the largest sugar planters in Louisiana and the owner of Willow Glen sugar plantation, near Alexandria. He was a native of Kentucky and in politics a whig. Josiah was also a whig, taking an active interest in politics, but never held a public office.

Mary and Josiah Williams had nine children, including Austin D. Williams, Josephine M. Williams, Archibald P. Williams, Charles Bushnell Williams, Annette Williams, Elizabeth Williams, and Pintard Davidson Williams.

William's husband died before the start of the American Civil War. She suffered severely by the reverses which marked the latter years of the war. The destruction of her residence, "The Oaks", by members of the Red River Campaign in 1864; the wounding of one son; the untimely death of another; the material misfortunes which reduced her from aflluence to poverty were great difficulties for her to deal with, but her faith was strong and it was this which aided her during difficult times.

For some time during the war, she was a refugee in Texas. In 1869, she removed to Opelousas, Louisiana, and frequently resided some portion of the year in the city of New Orleans.

In religion, Williams was a member of the Episcopal Church. She died July 3, 1891, and was buried at Opelousas, Louisiana.

== Publications ==
=== Poem ===
- The Serfs of Chateney

=== Book ===
- Tales and Legends of Louisiana
