= José Francisco Xavier de Salazar y Mendoza =

Mexican artist (1750–1802)

José Francisco Xavier de Salazar y Mendonza
- Born: 1750; Mérida, Yucatán, Mexico
- Died: August 15, 1802 (aged 51–52); Unknown
- Education: Academy of San Carlos
- Known for: Painting
- Spouse: Maria Antonia Magaña (died 1791)
- Children: 3

José Francisco Xavier de Salazar y Mendoza (1750 – August 15, 1802) was a portrait painter from New Spain known for being the first painter of significance to work in Spanish colonial New Orleans, Louisiana.

== Biography ==
Salazar was born to Salvador de Salazar and Feliciana Ojeda y Bazquez on the Yucatán peninsula in Mérida, Mexico. He attended the Academy of San Carlos in Mexico City. In 1784, he moved to New Orleans with his wife, Maria Antonia Magaña (d. 1793) and their two children, a son, José, and daughter, Francisca de Salazar y Magaña, both of whom became artists. Shortly after moving. they had another son, José Casiano. In 1788, their home was destroyed in a fire, and the family moved into a church building. In 1791, the family was living on St. Philip Street, near St. Louis Cathedral, where their youngest son, Ramon Rafael de la Crus, was born. Salazar died on August 15, 1802.

== Work ==
Salazar is considered the foremost painter in Spanish Colonial Louisiana. He painted the portraits of many prominent citizens of colonial Louisiana, including members of the church, government and the military. Some of his well-known sitters include Marianne Celeste Dragon, Don Carlos Trudeau Laveau, Joseph Montegut, Ignacio Balderas, Don Almonaster y Rojas, and Bishop Luis Ignatius Cardenas y Peñalver, among others. His paintings are in the late Baroque style that was favored in Spanish colonies and show the influence of Mexican provincial styles. The art historian Judith Bonner believes that Salazar's daughter Francisca worked with him due to certain drawing and painting inconsistencies found in his work. His use of transparent glazes and dark backgrounds has been compared to Goya.

== Collections ==
Salazar's work is held in many museums. It is included in the Louisiana State Museum collection, the Newcomb Art Museum collection, Worcester Art Museum, and the Historical Society of Pennsylvania, among other institutions.

== Gallery ==
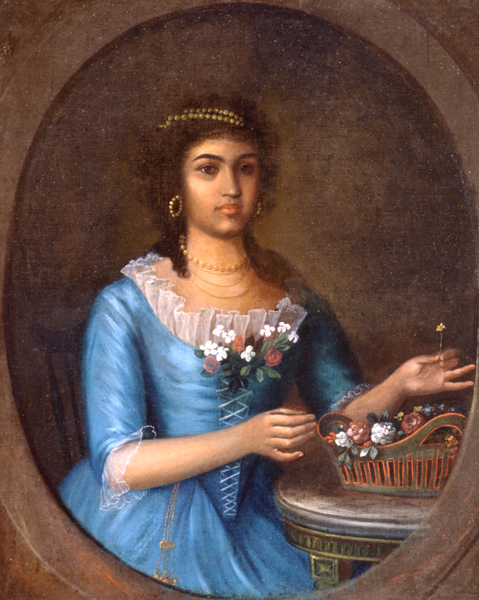
Portrait of Marianne Celeste Dragon or Dracos, c. 1795

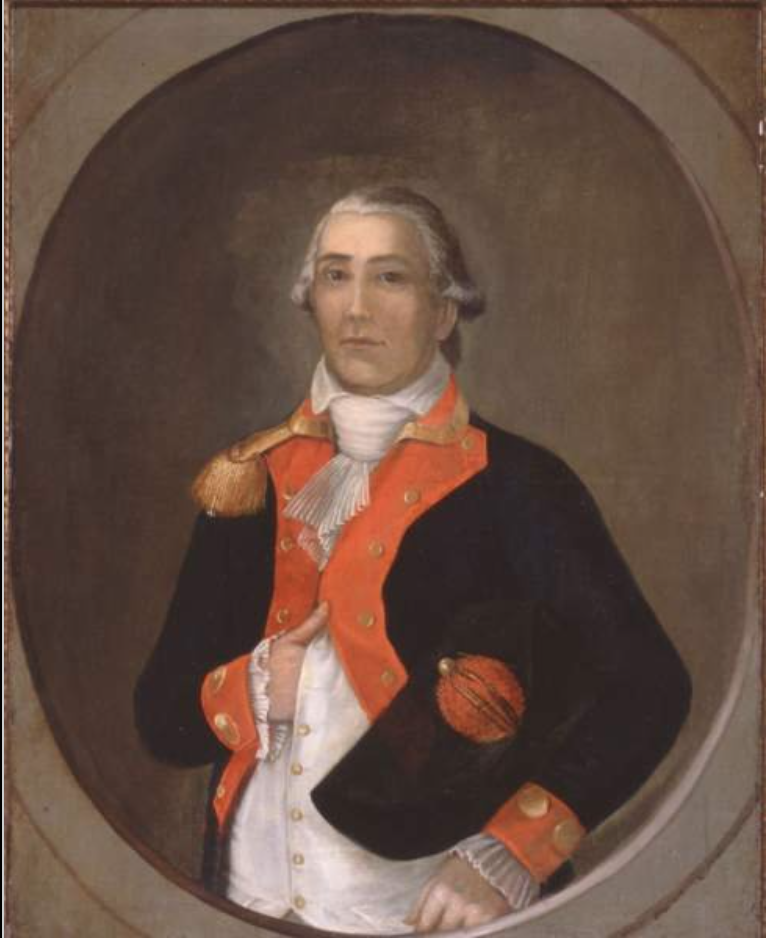
Portrait of Lieutenant Michel Dragon, father of Marianne Celeste Dragon, c. 1810

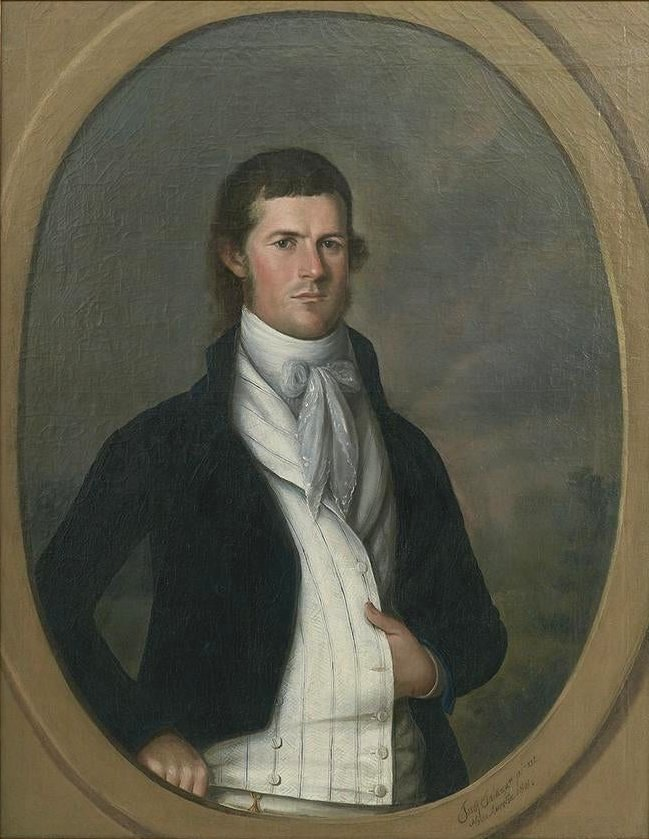
Portrait of Captain Anthony Knapp, c. 1801

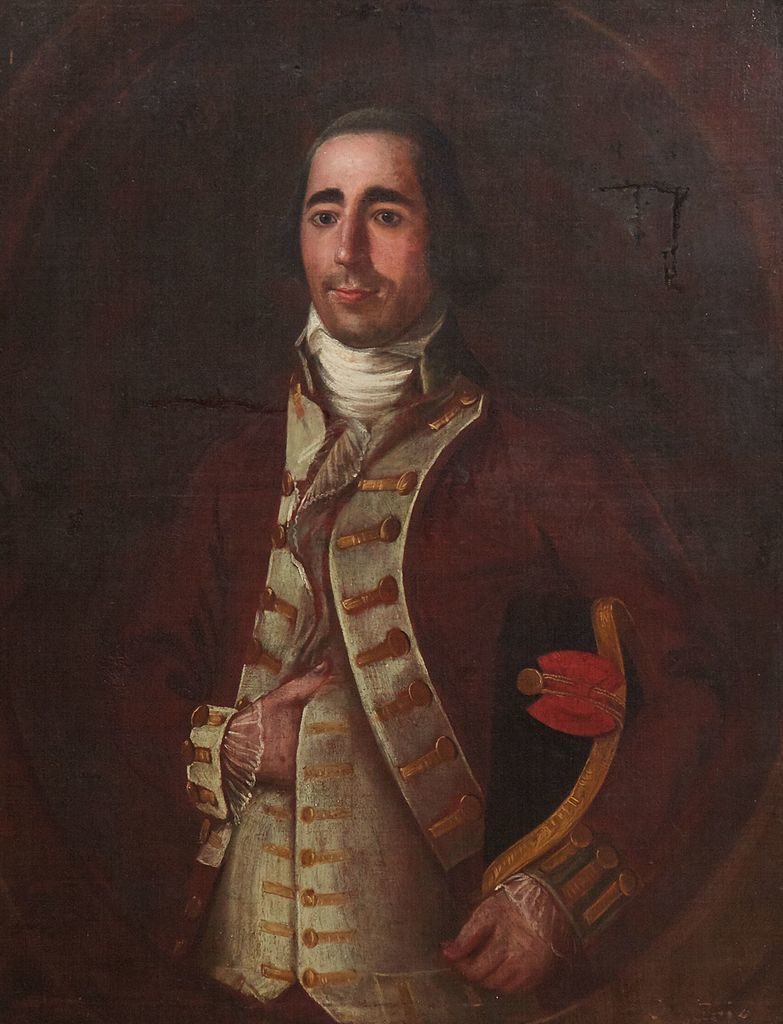
Portrait of Matias Francisco Alpuente y Ruiz, c. 1785–1795

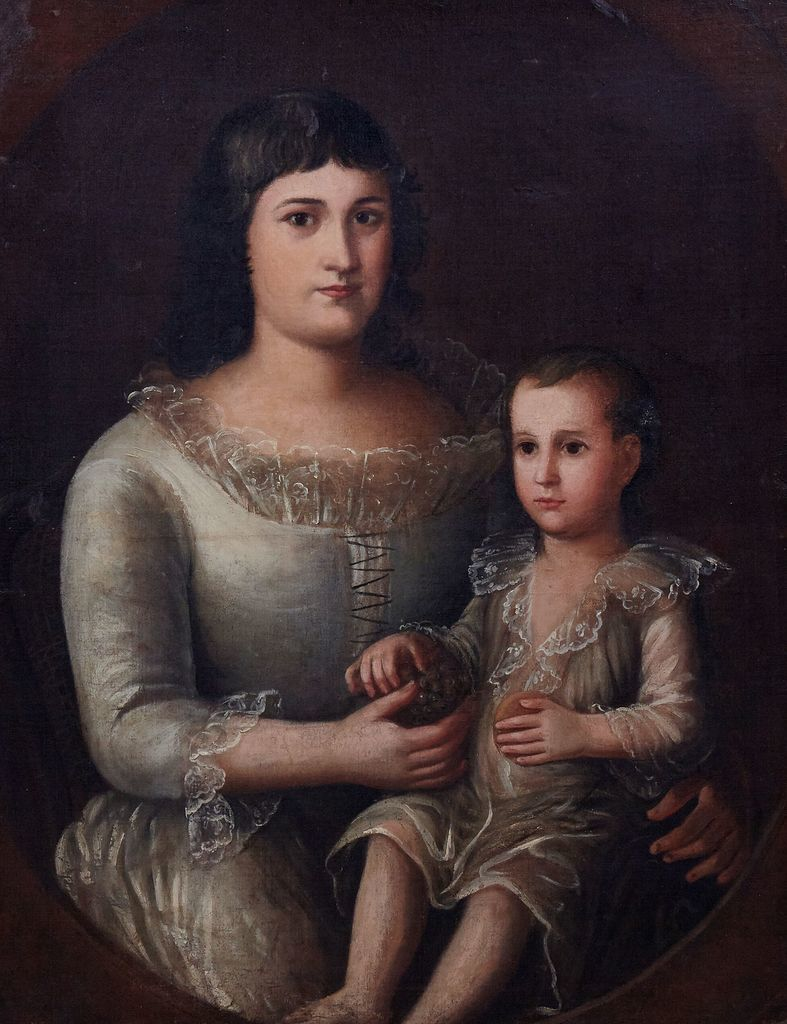
Portrait of a mother-and-child, c. 1785–1795

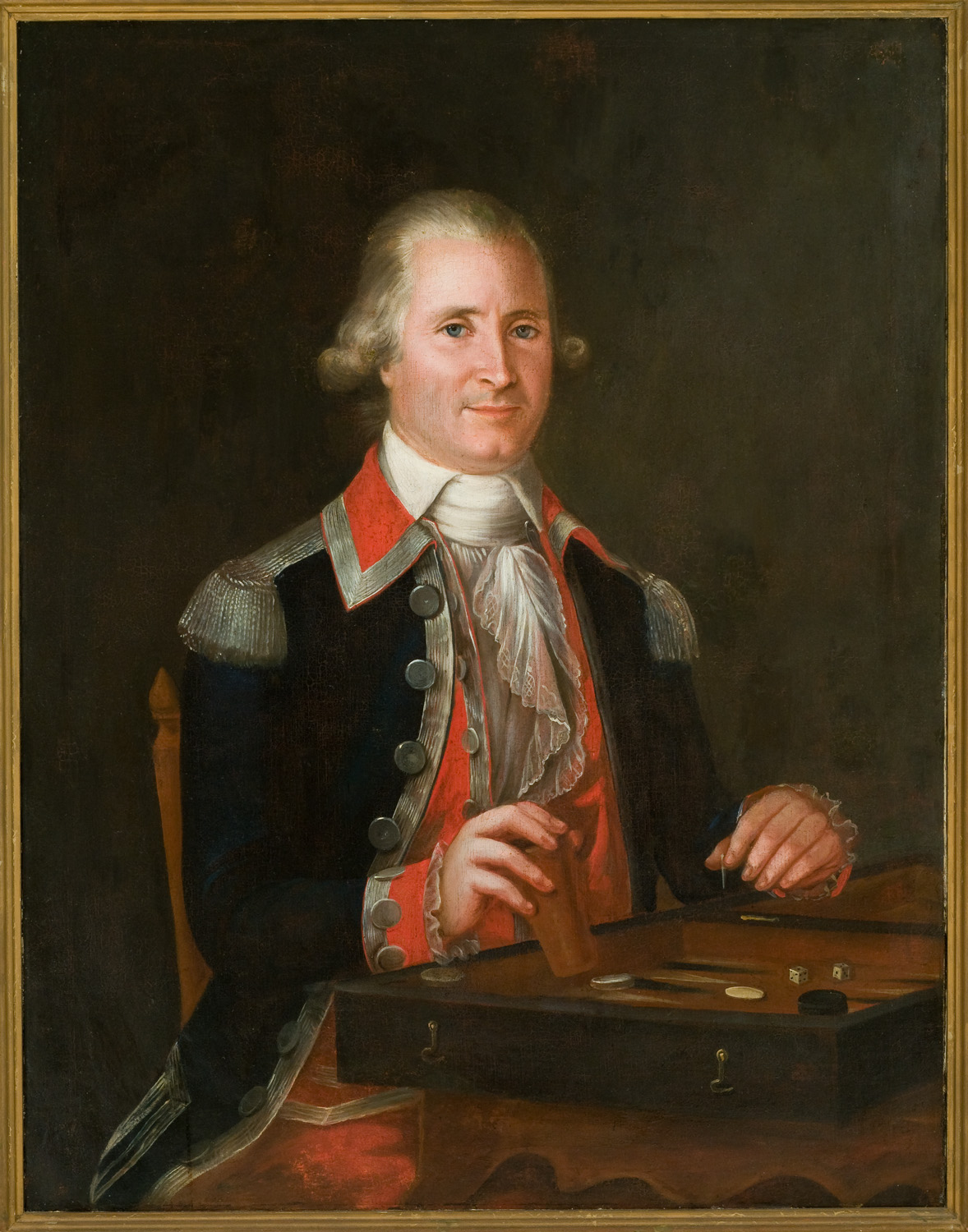
Portrait of Charles Trudeau Laveau, c. 1800

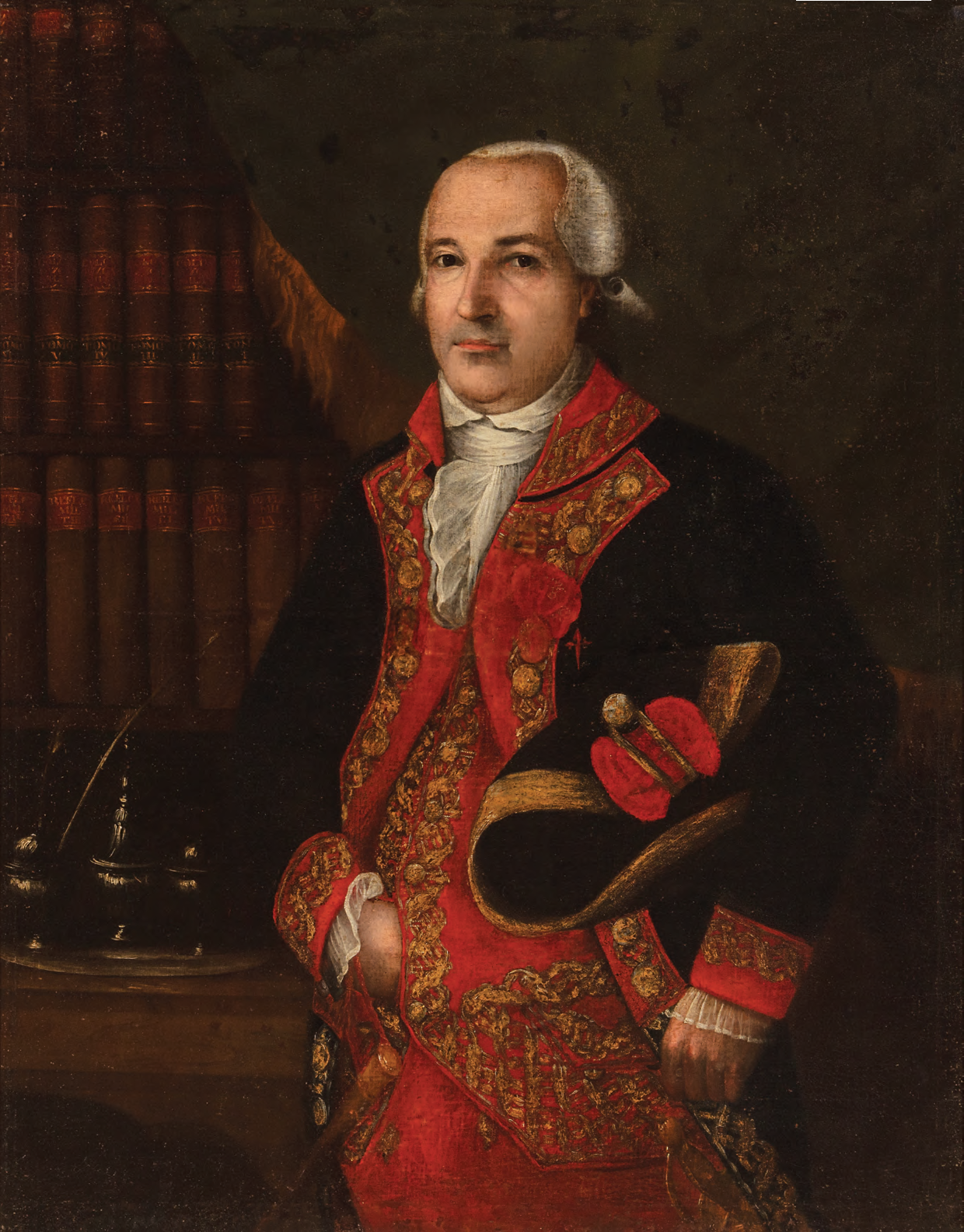
Portrait of Sebastián Calvo de la Puerta y O'Farrill, c. 1800
