= Charles Patton Dimitry =

American author (1837–1910)

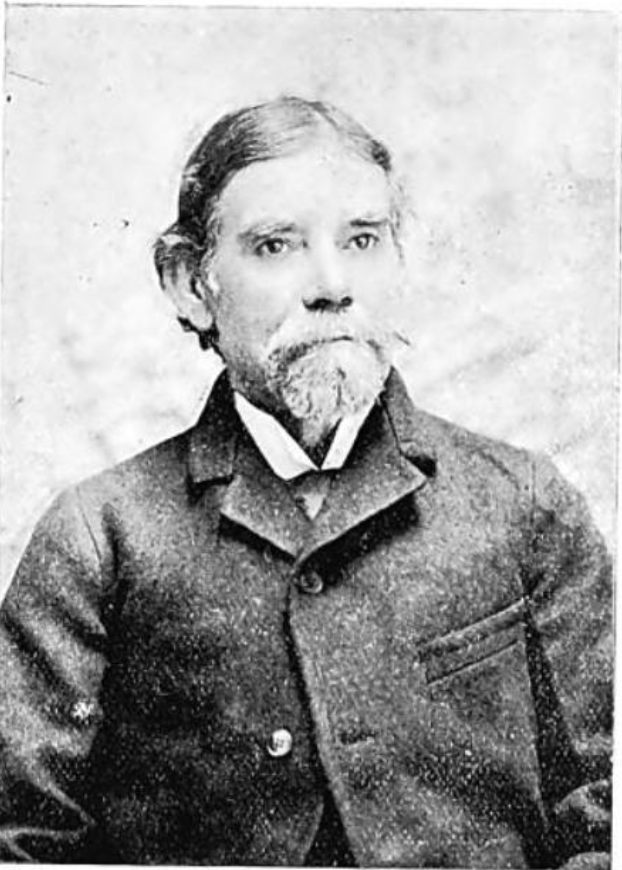
- Born: July 31, 1837; Washington, D.C., U.S.
- Died: November 10, 1910 (aged 73); New Orleans, Louisiana, U.S.
- Education: Saint Charles Parish; Georgetown University
- Occupations: Poet; Novelist; Historian
- Spouse: Nannie Elizabeth Johnston
- Relatives: John Bull Smith Dimitry; Ernest Lagarde; Marianne Celeste Dragon; George Pandely; Theodore John Dimitry Jr.
- Writing career
- Pen name: Tobias Guarnerius Jr. Braddock Field
- Years active: 1863-1911
- Period: Realism
- Genre: Southern Literature
- Notable work: The House in Balfour Street
- Father: Alexander Dimitry
- Family: Dimitry Family (Creoles)

Charles Patton Dimitry (July 31, 1837 – November 10, 1910) was an American author, poet, journalist, inventor, historian and Confederate soldier. He was mixed race Creole and the second son of author and diplomat Alexander Dimitry and also the grandson of Marianne Celeste Dragon. His catalog features a massive amount of literary publications one of his most notable works was The House in Balfour Street published in 1868. The author used two pseudonyms Tobias Guarnerius Jr. or Braddock Field his father Alexander used the pseudonym Tobias Guarnerius in some of his works. Charles worked for newspaper publications across the country including New Orleans, New York City, and Washington DC.

Charles was born in Washington D.C. along with his brother John Bull Smith Dimitry and sister Virginia Dimitry Ruth. They were educated in New Orleans by their father Alexander. Charles and his brother John eventually attended Georgetown University. Their father was the first person of color to attend the same institution. Charles wrote fictional and non-fictional works throughout his life. Toward the end of his life, he published historical content about New Orleans and the state of Louisiana.

Charles was a member of the Louisiana Society of the Sons of the American Revolution and became the state historian of the society. On January 16, 1888, he filed for a patent for the improvement to indelible ink which he invented. Charles won many awards for his writing. In June 1863, The Magnolia Weekly awarded Charles the $500 prize for best original serial story entitled Guilty or Not Guilty. In another instance, the Committee on Prose Compositions of the Press Convention on February 26, 1884, in New Orleans awarded Charles a prize of $50 for his essay The Massacre of St. Andre. He died in New Orleans at 73 years old.

== Early life ==
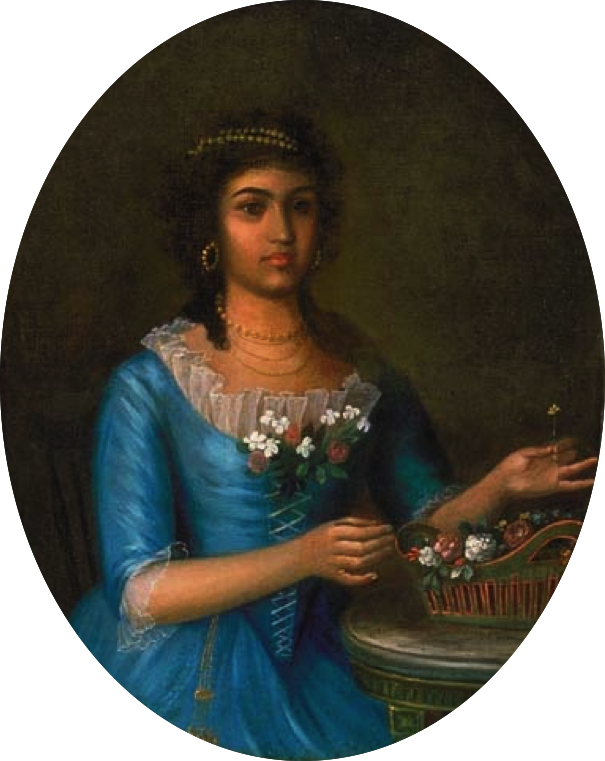
Charles' grandmother Marianne Celeste Dragon

Charles was born in Washington D.C. on July 31, 1837, to diplomat Alexander Dimitry and Mary Powell Mills daughter of prominent architect Robert Mills. He was ethnically an octoroon (1/8th black). Charles and several of his siblings were born in Washington while their father Alexander was the principal clerk for the Southwest postal department. The family moved back to New Orleans where Charles and his siblings were educated at College Hill, Mississippi at Saint Charles Parish. Their father Alexander established the school and he was also the dean. Charles' father was the first person of color appointed superintendent of public education in the state of Louisiana from 1847 to 1854.

Two incidents publicly threatened the family's prominent social status. Because of abusive racism and the disqualification of interracial marriages in the late 1700s and early 1800s in New Orleans Charles' grandmother Marianne Céleste Dragon passed as a white person on public records. Marriage records list her as a white woman. Two legal incidents almost identified her as a person of color, which would destabilize her legal status. The first incident occurred in the 1830s with the Forstall sisters Pauline and Josephine. Property was given to Marianne by the Frostall family and Pauline and Josephine sued to have the property returned. The Forstall sisters claimed she was pretending to be white, and the property was left to a woman of color. The white Marianne had to return the property. The court sided with Marianne allowing her to keep her property and her white status, ruling that the family had been in possession of the right to be categorized as a person not born of Negro extraction.

The second incident occurred when Charles was around 16 years old in 1853, his first cousin George Pandely was running for a seat on the Board of Assistant Aldermen. The assistant aldermen was responsible for urban infrastructure in New Orleans including streets and sidewalks a seat similar to a city council member. He was elected but forced to resign about seven months later because Victor Wiltz accused him of being of African lineage. It was against the law for people of African descent to hold public office. Pandelly took Victor Wiltz to court in the case Pandelly v. Wiltz (1854), in the case George's opponent, accused George's grandmother of having African ancestry to discredit his elected position. Pandelly took his opponent to court for slander. Pandelly won the case but no damages were rewarded, and the Pandely Affair inspired later generations to create a new genealogy where they claimed descent from a mythical, Indian princess of the Alibamu tribe named Malanta Talla. New Orleans records indicate that neither their grandmother nor great-grandmother were of Indian descent. Their great-grandmother was a former slave named Marie Françoise Chauvin Beaulieu de Montplaisir. She belonged to Mr. Charles Daprémont de La Lande, a member of the Superior Council.

Charles' father Alexander Dimitry became the first person of color to hold the position of U.S. Ambassador of Costa Rica & Nicaragua. But because the affair made national headlines an Ohio publication called Alexander African in 1859 discrediting the President of the United States because it was illegal for people of African descent to hold office. Charles attended Georgetown University in the late 1850s while his father and brother John Bull Smith Dimitry were diplomats.

== Later life ==
Charles was a private in the Louisiana Guard, Confederate Army. Most of his family served the Confederacy. His brother Alexander Godgrand Dimitry died in battle. His other brother John Bull Smith Dimitry briefly served until he was injured in battle. John joined his father at the Confederate Post Office in Richmond, VA where they both had prominent positions. After the war, around October 1865 Charles was arrested by Union forces for writing slander against the White House of the United States government in the Commercial Bulletin in Richmond, Virginia. He was released on probation. At the end of the war, he continued writing. Around the same period from 1864 to 1866 he published a series of novels in serial Guilty or not Guilty, Angela's Christmas, The Alderley Tragedy, Two Knaves and a Queen, and Gold Dust and Diamonds. His most notable work was published in 1868 entitled The House in Balfour-street. Some of his works were published under the pseudonyms Tobias Guarnerius Jr. or Braddock Field. Charles and his brother John both received master's degrees from Georgetown University in 1867.

He was an active journalist for the remainder of his life from 1865 until his death. Some of the publications that he was employed include Washington D.C. News Papers: Patriot, The Post, and The Sunday Gazette. In New York City he also wrote for: The World, The Daily Graphic, New York Star, and the Brooklyn Times-Union. In New Orleans: Bee, South Illustrated and Louisiana Illustrated of New Orleans, Louisiana. He married Nannie Elizabeth Johnston the daughter of Reuben Johnston in 1871. She was from Alexandria, Virginia. They tried to make one child, but it was stillborn. She died after almost nine years of marriage in 1880 and they had no surviving children. Charles was 43 years old and never remarried. Charles was a member of the Louisiana Society of the Sons of the American Revolution and became the state historian of the society. Towards the end of his life, he completed historical works about Louisiana including: Louisiana Families, Louisiana Story in Little Chapters and In Exile. He also invented an improvement to indelible ink and received a patent on January 16, 1888. In June 1863, The Magnolia Weekly awarded Charles the $500 prize for the best original serial story entitled Guilty or Not Guilty and the Committee on Prose Compositions of the Press Convention on February 26, 1884, in New Orleans awarded Charles a prize $50 for his essay The Massacre of St. Andre. Towards the end of his life, Charles became known as the blind historian of Louisiana because he lost his eyesight. He died in New Orleans at 73 years old.

== Literary works ==
Books, and Articles authored by Charles Patton Dimitry
Date	Title
1863	Our South
1864	Guilty or Not Guilty (The Magnolia Weekly, Richmond Va)
1865	Angela's Christmas
1866	Gold Dust and Diamonds
1866	The Alderly Tragedy (The Magnolia Weekly, Richmond Va)
1868	The House in Balfour Street
1874	Blue Beard's Island
1874	A Tourist's Paradise
1876	An Episode of the Revolution
1876	American Geographical Nomenclature
1884	The Massacre of St. Andre
1884	Zamba's Plot
1885	Adventure of Monsieur De Belle Isle
1885	The Heart of Louisiana
1885	Among Illinois Colonial Records I-IV
1885	Princess or Pretender?
1886	An Old House in New Orleans
1887	The Oldest House in the Mississippi Valley
1893	Coast Sugar Planters of Fifty and Sixty Years Ago
1894	The Origins of Some of the Colonial Families of Louisiana
1895	Louisiana Literature
1895	New Orleans Street Vendors and their Cries
1896	A Natural Mistake
1896	St. Valentine and His Day
1898	Louisiana Story in Little Chapters
1899	Old Louisiana Creole Families
1908	Chief Magistrates of New Orleans in the Olden Time
1908	The Early Days of Opera in New Orleans
1909	The Story of the Ancient Cabildo
1920	The Old Mobile Landing Head of the Basin in New Orleans

Poems authored by Charles Patton Dimitry
Date	Title
1866	Viva Italia
1869	Farewell, Ma Mie
1870	The Sergeant's Story
1896	Amoura's Valentine
1896	Sonnet to my Lady's Eyes

== See also ==
- Alfred Mercier

== Bibliography ==
- Breneman, A. A. (1887). Indelible Ink (370,383). New York, NY: John Polhemus Publishing.
- Thompson, Shirley Elizabeth (2009). Exiles at Home The Struggle to Become American in Creole New Orleans. Cambridge, MA: Harvard University Press. ISBN 9780674023512.
- Tucker, Susan (2016). City of Remembering: A History of Genealogy in New Orleans. Jackson, MI: University Press of Mississippi. ISBN 9781496806222.
- Smith, James Power; Archer, Anderson; Christian, George L.; Mccabe, W. Gordon (October 1917). Southern Historical Society Papers XLII. Richmond, VA: The Southern Historical Society Society.
- Wood, John Seymour (1896). The Bachelor of Arts A Monthly Magazine Devoted to University Interests and General Literature Volume 2. Wall Street, N.Y.: The Bachelor of Arts.
- Chandler, Julian Alvin Carroll; Riley, Franklin Lafayette; Ballagh, James Curtis; Henneman, John Bell; Mims, Edwin; Watson, Thomas Edward; Mitchell, Samuel Chiles; Fleming, Walter Lynwood (1909). The South in the Building of the Nation: Southern Biography Volume XI. Richmond, VA: The Southern Publication Society.
- Rutherford, Mildred Lewis (1907). The South in History and Literature A Hand-book of Southern Authors, from the Settlement of Jamestown, 1607, to Living Writers. Athens, GA: The Franklin Turner Company.
- Davidson, James Wood (1869). The Living Writers of the South. New York, NY: Carleton Publisher Madison Square.
- Johnson, Rossiter; Brown, John Howard, eds. (1904). "Charles Patton Dimitry". The Twentieth Century Biographical Dictionary of Notable Americans. Cowan-Erich. Vol. 3. Boston, MA: The Biographical Society.
- Chambers, William (1854). Things as They are in America. Philadelphia, PA: Lippincott, Grambo & Company.
- Foretia, Crystal (April 5, 2023). The Color of Intimacy: Marriage, Passing, and the Legal Strategies of Afro-Creole Women in Antebellum New Orleans (PDF) (Thesis). New York, New York: Columbia University Department of History. Archived from the original (PDF) on July 9, 2023.
- Maxwell, W.J. (1916). General Register of Georgetown University. Washington, D.C.: Georgetown University Press.
- Herringshaw, Thomas William, ed. (1901). "Charles Patton Dimitry". Herringshaw's Encyclopedia of American Biography of the Nineteenth Century. Chicago, IL: American Publishers Association.
- Alderman, Edwin Anderson; Smith, Charles Alphonso; Metcalf, John Calvin, eds. (1901). "Charles Patton Dimitry Dimitry". Library of Southern Literature Biographical Dictionary of Authors Presented by Lucian Lamar Knight. Vol. 15. Atlanta, GA: The Martin and Hoyt Company.
- Fiske, John; Wilson, James Grant, eds. (1888). "Charles Patton Dimitry". Appletons' Cyclopaedia of American Biography. Crane-Grimshaw. Vol. 2. New York, NY: D. Appleton and Company.
- Beach, Frederick Converse; Rines, George Edwin; Dole, Nathan Haskell; Roe, Edward Thomas; Copeland, Thomas Campbell, eds. (1888). "Charles Patton Dimitry". The Encyclopedia Americana A General Dictionary of the Arts and Sciences, Literature, History, Biography, Geography, Etc. Daae - Emerson. Vol. 6. New York, NY: The Americana Company.
- Pecquet du Bellet, Louise (1907a). Some Prominent Virginia Families. Vol. 4. Lynchburg, VA: J. P. Bell Company (Incorporated).
- Pecquet du Bellet, Louise (1907). Some Prominent Virginia Families. Vol. 3. Lynchburg, VA: J. P. Bell Company Incorporated.
- Maddox, Joseph H. (August 4, 1853). "Evidence of Lineage The Pandelly Affair". New Orleans Daily Crescent, Volume 6, No. 129. New Orleans, Louisiana: New Orleans Daily Crescent. p. 3, col. 2. Archived (PDF) from the original on August 25, 2023. "The Pandelly Affair"
- De Leon, Thomas Cooper (1909). Belles, Beaux and Brains of the 60's. New York, NY: G.W. Dillingham Company.
