= Alexander Dimitry =

American politician

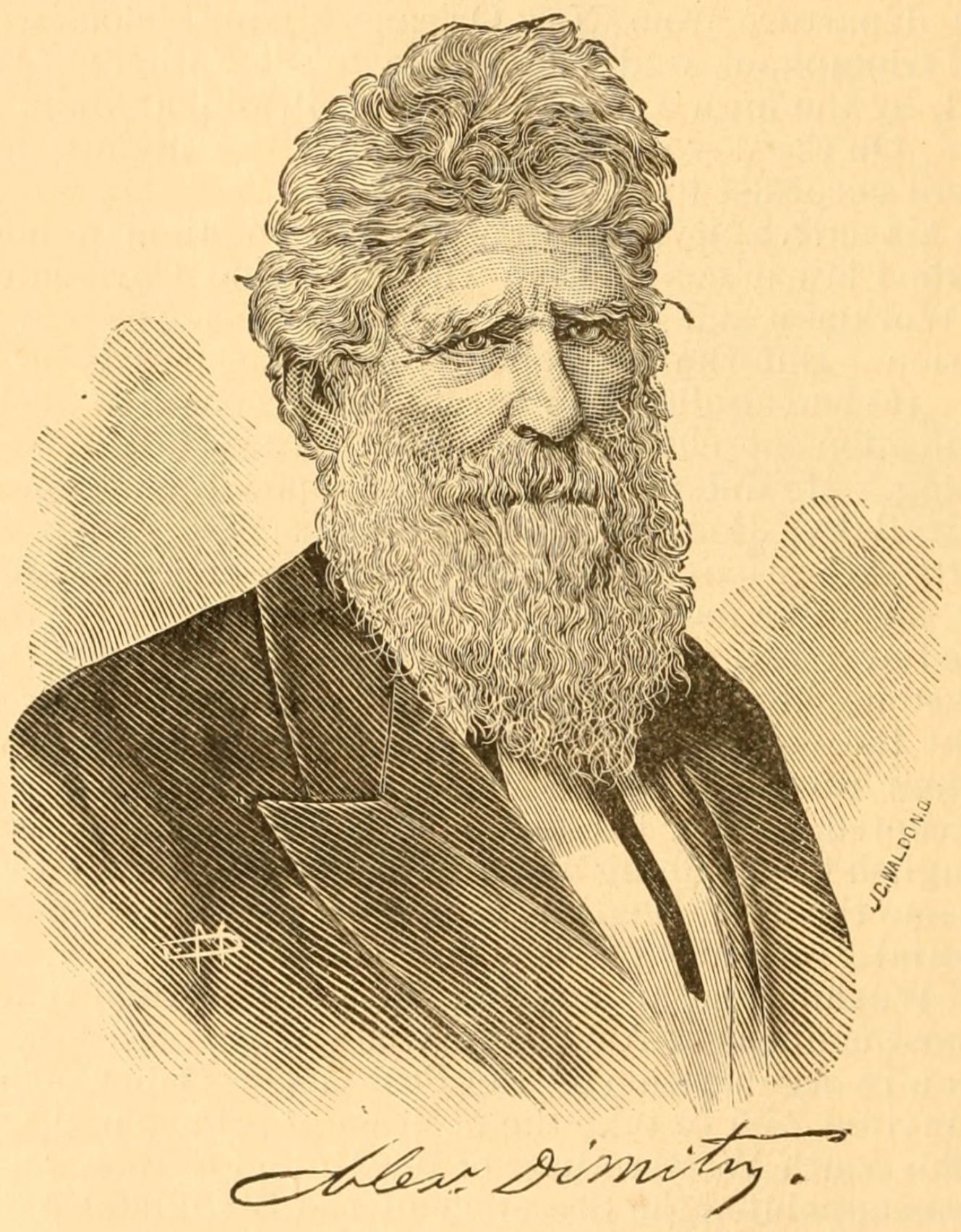

Louisiana Superintendent of Public Education
- In office 1847–1849
- Preceded by: Established
- Succeeded by: Robert C. Nicholas

U.S. Ambassador of Costa Rica & Nicaragua
- In office September 29, 1859 – April 27, 1861
- Preceded by: Mirabeau B. Lamar
- Succeeded by: Charles N. Riotte

New Orleans Assistant Superintendent of Public Education
- In office 1867–1868

Personal details
- Born: February 7, 1805 New Orleans, Louisiana, US
- Died: January 30, 1883 (aged 77) New Orleans, Louisiana, US
- Resting place: Saint Louis Cemetery No. 1
- Spouse: Mary Powell Mills (m. 1835–1883)
- Children: John Bull Smith Dimitry; Charles Patton Dimitry
- Education: Georgetown University
- Profession: Lawyer, Statesman, Educator
- Known for: Education, diplomacy
- Other name: Tobias Guarnerius
- Family: Dimitry Family (Creoles)

Alexander Dimitry (February 7, 1805 – January 30, 1883) was an American author, diplomat, educator, journalist, lawyer, orator, and publicist. He was the first state superintendent of public instruction in Louisiana and represented the United States as Ambassador to Costa Rica and Nicaragua. He was the first person of color to hold both offices and despite his mixed heritage (quadroon), he was one of the few people of color to serve in the bureaucracy of the Confederate Government. Alexander generally passed as white but still witnessed countless incidents of racism. Two major incidents involving his family were documented in court entitled Forstall, f.p.c. v. Dimitry (1833) and Pandelly v. Wiltz (1854). Throughout his entire life, Alexander underwent constant persecution and was always reminded of his skin color and ethnic background.

Dimitry was born in New Orleans to a Greek white father, Andrea Dimitry, and to a mixed Greek-African mother, Marianne Céleste Dragon. His father was from the Greek island Hydra. He grew up speaking a number of languages and promoted Greece throughout his entire life. He attended Georgetown University, which later paved the way for other members of the Dimitry family to attend the institution. He was a prominent educator throughout his entire life, giving lectures on many subjects including The Wonders of Astronomy and The Harmonies of Creation.

Dimitry was one of the founders of the secret society The Seven Wise Men or The Order of the Heptasophs. He was also a member of the Cosmopolitan Club and Louisiana Historical Society. He was one of vice-presidents during the Grand Unification Mass Meeting in 1873 to desegregate schools in Louisiana during the Jim Crow era. He was a prominent educator and became a chair at the Pass Christian College. His children John Bull Smith Dimitry, Charles Patton Dimitry, and Elizabeth Virginia Dimitry Ruth became prominent Creole educators and writers, while his other son Thomas Dabney Dimitry became a post office superintendent. His nephew Ernest Lagarde also followed in his footsteps, speaking numerous languages and teaching at Mount St. Mary's University. Alexander died at seventy-seven years old in New Orleans and is buried at Saint Louis Cemetery No. 1 along with other family members. The entrance at Wolf River was named Dimitry Point and the region is known as Alexander Dimitry Claim.

== Family ==
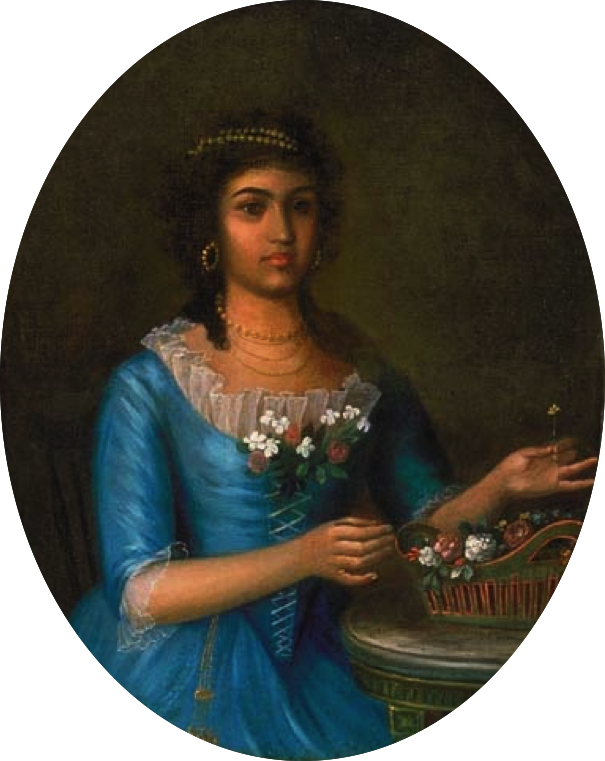
Dimitry's mother Marianne Céleste Dragon. Portrait painted ca. 1795 and attributed to Josef de Salazar

Alexander Dimitry was born in New Orleans, February 7, 1805, to Greek merchant Andrea Dimitry (1775–1852) and Marianne Céleste Dragon (1777–1856) who was of partial Greek ancestry and Creole heritage. His father immigrated to New Orleans in the spring of 1799, and fought in the War of 1812, serving in the Battle of New Orleans with Major General and future President Andrew Jackson.

On Dimitry's mother's side, his maternal grandfather Michel or Miguel Dragon was also a Greek immigrant to Louisiana and a veteran of the American Revolution, having served under Bernardo de Galvez. His maternal grandmother Françoise Monplaisir was born to an enslaved mulatto woman in New Orleans and baptized in 1755. Their daughter and Dimitry's mother Marianne Céleste Dragon was born free, although Dragon and Monplaisir did not marry until 1815. Marianne Céleste Dragon's 1777 baptismal record identifies her as a free pardo, but she was identified as white upon her marriage to Andrea Dimitry in 1799. The Roman Catholic ceremony was performed by Antonio de Sedella. A portrait of Marianne Céleste Dragon is believed to have been painted by José Salazar, an itinerant Mexican painter who immigrated to New Orleans in the mid-1780s.

Alexander was one of ten children. His brothers and sisters included: Euphrosine, Mannella Airnée, Constantine Andrea, John Baptiste Miguel Dracos, Clino Angelica, Marie Francesca Athenais, Nicholas Dimitry, Mathilde Elizabeth Theophainie, and Antonie Marie.

== Education ==
By the age of ten, educated by private tutors, Dimitry was fluent in classical Greek and Latin. He spoke English, French, Greek, Italian, and Spanish. At fifteen years old Dimitry entered Georgetown University in Washington, D.C.; he graduated in 1826. When he returned to New Orleans he studied law under Auguste Davezac and James Workman. He was also a student of Christian Roselius.

Dimitry took the bar examination and entered law as a profession. He was knowledgeable in Roman, English, and French law and immediately obtained a reputable position. He was more interested in education, literature, and languages, and became a professor at the College of Baton Rouge. He returned to New Orleans after two years and was one of the owners and editors of L'Abeille, a French newspaper. He was the first editor of the English side of the paper.

== Career ==
Dimitry frequently traveled to Washington, D.C., where he met his wife, Mary Powell Mills. Mills was the daughter of Robert Mills, a distinguished architect. He was from Charleston, South Carolina, and the designer of the Washington Monument. The couple married in Washington, D.C., on April 5, 1835. In 1835, Alexander became the principal clerk for the Southwest Postal Department. He remained in this position for four years and several of his children were born in Washington. Alexander was a notable author and wrote for many different publications from 1830 to 1850 under the pseudonym Tobias Guarnerius. His son Charles Patton Dimitry would later take on the name Tobias Guarnerius Jr.

The U.S. Congress appointed Dimitry secretary of the commission sent to Mexico to settle disputes. His knowledge of the Spanish language and international law made him a valuable member of the commission. When he returned to Louisiana he established the college of Saint Charles Parish. He was dean of the college. Dimitry then became superintendent of the schools of New Orleans. Around this time, Alexander educated prominent Creole American author, poet, and translator Mary Bushnell Williams.

Isaac Johnson Governor of Louisiana appointed Dimitry state superintendent of public education. Dimitry was the first person of color and the first incumbent of the office in Louisiana. The office organized the public school system throughout the state. He held this position from 1847 to 1849.

In 1853, Dimitry's nephew George Pandely ran for a seat on the Board of Assistant Aldermen, a municipal body responsible for urban infrastructure in New Orleans including streets and sidewalks. Victor Wiltz in Pandelly v. Wilts (1854) seized on Pandelly's mixed-race ancestry to discredit his election, prompting Pandelly to take his opponent to court for slander. The case was dismissed, but the Pandely Affair inspired later generations to invent a new genealogy for themselves in which they claimed descent from a mythical, possibly invented Indian princess of the Alibamu tribe named Malanta Talla.

After his service as superintendent Dimitry was called to Washington by William L. Marcy. He was one of the clerks to the Secretary of State William L. Marcy under President Franklin Pierce. Dimitry was appointed to a commission to revise some treaties with American Indian Tribes. In 1855, he was appointed by the U.S. Department of State to translate diplomatic correspondences with different foreign governments. He was fluent in eleven languages. While he was at the State Department he lectured at Georgetown University.

President Buchanan appointed Dimitry as United States minister resident of Costa Rica and Nicaragua in 1859. He was hired to settle diplomatic disputes. Dimitry was crucial because he spoke the native languages fluently he also made important speeches in Spanish at diplomatic functions. He was very knowledgeable about the conditions of Central America and Dimitry was about to obtain a treaty with Nicaragua but because of the secession of South Carolina on December 20, 1860, the negotiation ended. Louisiana also passed an ordinance of secession on January 26, 1861, one month later.

Dimitry, concerned about his huge family in New Orleans and his state resigned from his position as ambassador. Secretary of State William H. Seward expressed President Abraham Lincoln's discontent with Dimitry's decision when he returned to Washington. Dimitry turned down a yearly salary of $12,000 in gold. His son John Dimitry was also a Greek-American Creole. He was extremely educated and worked with his father as the Secretary of Legation of Costa Rica and Nicaragua.

== Civil War ==
Alexander Dimitry's son John Dimitry served as a private in Captain George Graham's company which afterward became Company C and the color company of the Crescent City Native Guards. He was one of the colored guard.

During the American Civil War Alexander traveled to Richmond Virginia where he served as chief clerk to the Postmaster General. He later became Assistant Postmaster General of the Confederacy. The Postmaster was John Henninger Reagan. His son John was wounded and later rejoined his father at the Postmaster's office. His other son Alexander Godgrand Dimitry died in the American Civil War. He lost his life in battle near Germantown, Maryland. He was part of the Eighteenth Virginia Cavalry C.S.A.

Although Dimitry had connections in the Confederate government, he did not have the respect of all his compatriots. On July 29, 1861, Dimitry asked P. G. T. Beauregard for the body of James Cameron, who was killed during the First Battle of Bull Run, so he could be buried. Dimitry signed the letter with, "Old Friend + Fellow Louisianan". Beauregard replied: "I listen to no appeal from a traitor to the land of his birth," as Dimitry had abandoned the Confederate cause.

On September 4, 1865, President Andrew Johnson issued Alexander a Presidential pardon for his participation in the American Civil War. At the end of the war the family moved to Brooklyn, New York.

== Later life and death ==
In 1868, the family moved back to New Orleans. One year later Dimitry became professor of Latin at the Christian Brothers College in Pass Christian, Mississippi. By the 1870s, Dimitry, his siblings, nephews, in-laws, and cousins comprised over 100 people in New Orleans. They were an extremely politically connected Greek-American Creole family.

Dimitry's son John helped write Jefferson Davis's biography with his wife Varina Davis. In 1875, Alexander wrote an article for Le Meschacébé, a prominent Louisiana newspaper entitled The Creole Defined. He defines the word Creole and outlines its significance throughout grammatical history.

Dimitry spent the remainder of his life at Christian Brothers College. He continued writing articles for newspapers and lectured all over the South. He often lectured at the dedication of buildings and was a well-known scholar. His lectures included his theory on Earth's Fitness for Man, which discussed the formation of Earth, light, and animals, the creation, and the relation of man to the infinite. He participated at the commencement of the Peabody Normal Seminary on several occasions. He went to commencements all over the south. He was a member of the Order of Heptasophs. He died at his home in New Orleans in 1883. Many of Dimitry's writings remain unpublished.

Alexander Dimitry and Mary Powell Mills had 10 children, Their names are in order of birth: John Bull Smith Dimitry, Charles Patton Dimitry, Eliza Virginia Mills Dimitry, Mary Elizabeth Lynn Dimitry, Alexander Godgrand Dimitry, Mathilde Fortier Dimitry, Robert Mills Dimitry, Robert Andrea Dimitry, Thomas Daney Dimitry, and Ernest Alexander Lagarde Dimitry. Alexander's Creole mother Marianne Celeste Dragon has appeared in several publications. Her portrait was on the cover of the 2009 book Exiles at Home by Shirley Elizabeth Thompson. She was also featured in the 2013 book Behind Closed Doors Art in the Spanish American Home, 1492-1898 By Mia L. Bagneris, Michael A. Brown, Suzanne L. Stratton-Pruitt.

== Literary work ==
Books and Articles authored by Alexander Dimitry
| Date | Title |
|---|---|
| 1837 | The Nameless One (A Tale of Florence) |
| 1839 | Address by Mr. Alexander Dimitry |
| 1839 | Lecture on the Study of History, Applied to the Progress of Civilization 1839 |
| 1841 | Lecture on The Wonders of Astronomy |
| 1850 | Report of Alexander Dimitry Superintendent of Public Education of Louisiana |
| 1851 | A Psychological Tale as (Tobias Guarnerius) |
| 1878 | De Saulcy's Ruins of Sodom and Gomorrah |
| 1879 | Art and Its Influence |
| 1894 | The Relation between the Literatures of Greece and Hindostan |

== See also ==
- Andrea Dimitry
- Quadroon
- Homer Plessy
- José Salazar
- John Celivergos Zachos

== Bibliography ==
- Pecquet du Bellet, Louise (1907a). Some Prominent Virginia Families. Vol. 4. Lynchburg, VA: J. P. Bell Company (Incorporated).
- Pecquet du Bellet, Louise (1907). Some Prominent Virginia Families. Vol. 3. Lynchburg, VA: J. P. Bell Company Incorporated.
- Kendall, John Smith (1922). History of New Orleans Volume 3. Chicago And New York: The Lewis Publishing Company.
- Brown, John Howard (1900). Lamb's Biographical Dictionary of the United States: Chubb-Erich. Boston, Mass: James H. Lamb Company.
- Tucker, Susan (2016). City of Remembering: A History of Genealogy in New Orleans. Jackson, MI: University Press of Mississippi. ISBN 9781496806222.
- Thompson, Shirley Elizabeth (2009). Exiles at Home The Struggle to Become American in Creole New Orleans. Cambridge, MA: Harvard University Press l Paternoster Row. ISBN 9780674023512.
- Bagneris, Mia L.; Brown, Michael A.; Stratton-Pruitt, Suzanne L. (2013). Behind Closed Doors Art in the Spanish American Home 1492-1898. Brooklyn, NY: The Monacelli Press. ISBN 9781580933650.
- Fiske, John; Wilson, James Grant, eds. (1888). "Alexander Dimitry". Appletons' Cyclopaedia of American Biography. Crane-Grimshaw. Vol. 2. New York, NY: D. Appleton and Company.
- Arroyo, Oscar (May 1886). Biennial Report of the Secretary of State of the State of Louisiana to His Excellency S.D. McEnery Governor of Louisiana. Baton Rouge, LA: Printed by Leon Jasremski State Printer.
- Foretia, Crystal (April 5, 2023). The Color of Intimacy: Marriage, Passing, and the Legal Strategies of Afro-Creole Women in Antebellum New Orleans (PDF) (Thesis). New York, New York: Columbia University Department of History. Archived (PDF) from the original on July 9, 2023.
- Maxwell, W.J. (1916). General Register of Georgetown University. Washington, D.C.: Georgetown University Press.
- Herringshaw, Thomas William, ed. (1901). "Alexander Dimitry". Herringshaw's Encyclopedia of American Biography of the Nineteenth Century. Chicago, IL: American Publishers Association.
- Alderman, Edwin Anderson; Smith, Charles Alphonso; Metcalf, John Calvin, eds. (1901). "Alexander Dimitry Dimitry". Library of Southern Literature Biographical Dictionary of Authors Presented by Lucian Lamar Knight. Vol. 15. Atlanta, GA: The Martin and Hoyt Company.
- Broyard, Bliss (2007). One Drop My Father's Hidden Life A Story of Race and Family Secrets. New York, New York: Little Brown and Company. ISBN 9780316019736.
- Reeves, William Dale (1999). Paths to Distinction Dr. James White, Governor E.D. White, and Chief Justice Edward Douglass White of Louisiana. Lafayette, LA: University of Louisiana at Lafayette. ISBN 9781887366335.
- Shelby, Julian A. (September 29, 1866). "Professor Alexander Dimitry". The Daily Phoenix, Volume 2, No. 163. Columbia, South Carolina: The Daily Phoenix. p. 3, col. 2. Archived (PDF) from the original on September 2, 2023.
- Rogers, William O. (1868). Annual Report of the Board of Directors of Public Schools, City of New Orleans. New Orleans, LA: Stetson & Armstrong, Stationers and Printers.
