= Michel Dragon =

Greek American Lieutenant in the American Revolution

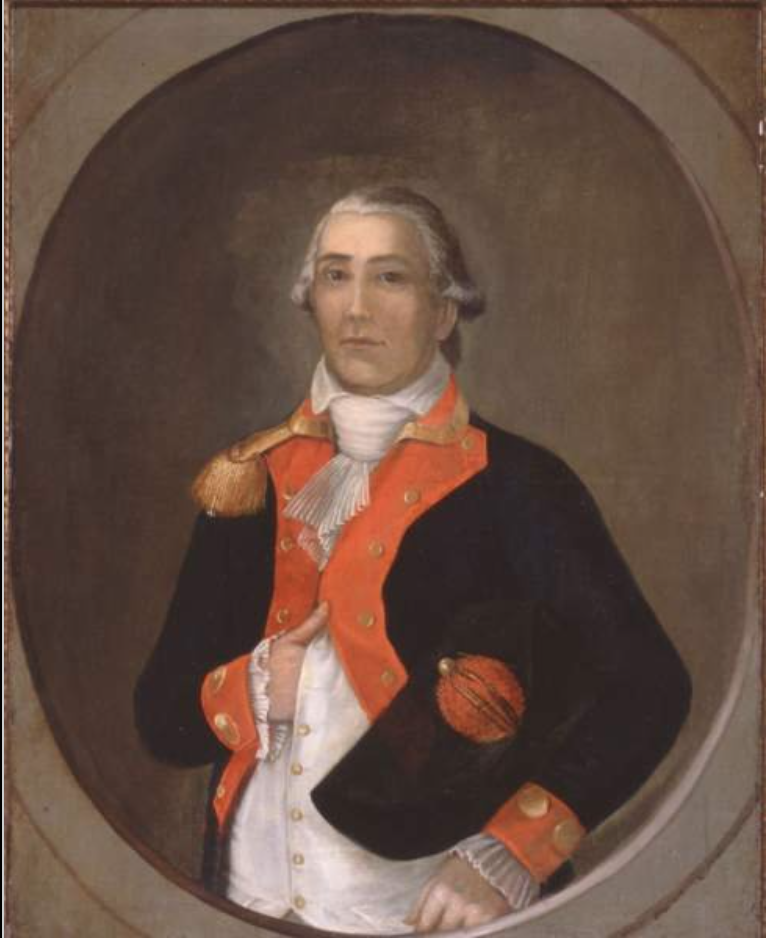
- Lieutenant Dragon
- Born: Michael Dracos; 1739; Athens, Ottoman Empire
- Died: March 11, 1821 (aged 81–82); New Orleans, Louisiana, U.S.
- Children: Marianne Celeste Dragon
- Military career
- Allegiance: United States
- Branch: Spanish Army
- Service years: 1762–1805
- Rank: Lieutenant; First Sergeant; Second Sergeant
- Nickname: Don Michel Dragon
- Unit: Louisiana Provincial Militia
- Conflict: American Revolutionary War; Capture of Fort Bute; Battle of Baton Rouge; Battle of Fort Charlotte; Siege of Pensacola
- Other work: Entrepreneur
- Family: Dimitry Family (Creoles)

Michel Dragon (Greek: Μιχάλης Δράκος; 1739–1821) also known as Don Michael Dragon or Michael Dracos was a Greek merchant and lieutenant who served in the Spanish Army during the American Revolution, fighting with the Patriots for the independence of the United States of America. He participated in the Gulf Coast Campaign, notably in the Battle of Baton Rouge, Battle of Fort Charlotte and in the Siege of Pensacola where he was in command of the provincial militia. Dragon was one of the first Greek Americans and one of few to fight in the American Revolutionary War. He married a former slave of African descent and they had two children, one of them being Marianne Celeste Dragon. Both he and his daughter were the subjects of two different portraits by Josef de Salazar. He was also a businessman and major planter. Dragon and his wife Francoise Chauvin Beaulieu de Monplaisir were major planters in New Orleans.

Dragon was born in Athens in Ottoman Greece. He migrated to New Orleans sometime around 1760. He briefly joined the French militia but then became part of the Spanish military when Spain took over New Orleans. He fought in the American Revolutionary for the Spanish. Around 1775, he had a relationship with a former slave named Marie Françoise Chauvin de Beaulieu de Montplaisir. She belonged to Mr. Charles Daprémont de La Lande, a member of the Superior Council. Marie and Dragon had two children Louise Dragon and Marianne Celeste Dragon. Dragon became an American revolutionary war hero. He was honored by King Charles III of Spain and given the rank of Lieutenant. He became a U.S. citizen when Louisiana became part of the United States. Marie Françoise De Montplasi and Don Michel eventually married. His daughter Marianne Celeste Dragon inherited a massive fortune.

Dragon's family became one of the oldest and most influential Greek families in United States history. His grandson Alexander Dimitry, who was mixed-race due to his mother's partial African ancestry, was the first person of color to attend Georgetown University. He was also the first Greek American and first person of color to become a U.S. Ambassador. His first granddaughter, Euphrosyne, married Paul Pandely, another native of Greece. Paul's mother, Elizabeth English, was a member of the English royal House of Stuart. His granddaughter Clino Angelica Dimitry married a prominent Italian surgeon Giovanni Pieri, MD. He was actively involved in the unification of Italy and collaborated with Giuseppe Mazzini to form the first Italian government known as the Roman Republic (1849). Their actions eventually led to the Unification of Italy.

== Life ==
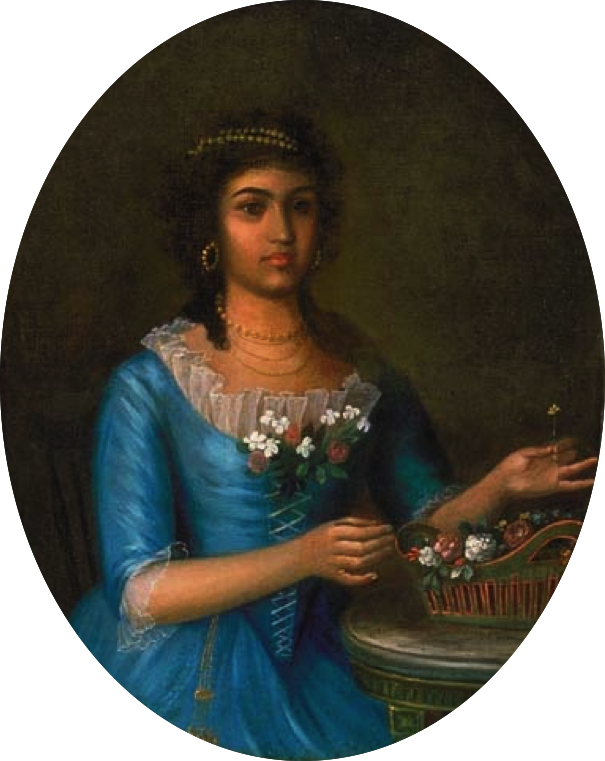
Michel married a freed African slave with whom she had two children. Depicted: Michel's daughter, Marianne Celeste Dragon, 1795

Michael Dragon was born in Athens, Greece, in 1739. His father's name was Antonio Dracos and his mother's name was Clino Hellenes. Dragon's military career began in the French militia when he migrated to New Orleans from the Greek city of Athens. He later became affiliated with the Spanish military first as a second sergeant, then first sergeant, and finally as a lieutenant. He served for the Spanish military during the American Revolutionary War. The first battle was the Capture of Fort Bute in 1779. Dragon was part of the artillery division under Colonel Gilbert Antoine de St. Maxent. He fought in the Battle of Baton Rouge, Battle of Fort Charlotte and gradually increased his rank to lieutenant in the Siege of Pensacola under Bernardo de Gálvez. Dragon led the Louisiana provincial militia. He was later honored by Charles III of Spain upon the recommendation of Baron Francisco Luis Héctor de Carondelet. He continued his service to the Spanish military and Andres Almonaster y Rojas until New Orleans became part of the United States. Dragon and his family then became American citizens and were given several hectares of land as a reward for Dragon's actions in the American Revolution. (Note: "Michel Dragon was awarded 1,000 acres of land for his valiant services rendered with the Spanish military. The land was situated on the Gulf Coast of Mississippi in Harrison County. [Years later, his son-in-law] Andrea Dimitry built a villa and called the place Dimitry Point.")

Dragon married a freed African slave named Marie Francoise Chauvin Beaulieu de Montplaisir. She was the daughter of François Chauvin de Monplaisir de Beaulieu & Marianne Lalande. Dragon and Montplaisir had two children Louise Dragon (Dracos) and Marianne Celeste Dragon (Dracos) around 1775. Louise died at a young age. Dragon and Marie Françoise were married later in life due to the color of her skin and the issues surrounding interracial marriages in New Orleans. Their only daughter, Marianne, passed as white, despite being mixed. She married a Greek immigrant in 1799 named Andrea Dimitry. Marie and Dragon were married on December 30, 1815, at the Saint Louis Church, New Orleans. Dragon was 76 and his wife was Marie Françoise was 59. According to records of the slave contracts, some of the slaves were bought and sold by people of color and relatives of Marie Françoise Chauvin Beaulieu de Montplaisir. Dragon purchased a slave named Cyprion from a freed African American slave owner named Marguerite Monplaisir. Carlota was also a female African American slave owned by Dragon and purchased by a free African American named Francisco Monplaiser. According to the 1805 New Orleans City Directory, Michel Dragon and his wife resided at 60 Rue de Chartres. Andrea Dimitry and Marianne Céleste Dragon lived next door at 58 Rue de Chartres. The laws governing black slave ownership and free people of color in New Orleans began to change.

Dragon and his wife died in the early 1820s. He left a vast fortune to his daughter Marianne Céleste Dragon. Dragon's family continued to flourish within the confines of New Orleans. His grandchildren became very important members of the community in New Orleans.

== See also ==
- Anti-miscegenation laws in the United States

== Bibliography ==
- Pecquet du Bellet, Louise; Jaquelin, Edward; Jaquelin, Martha Carey (1907). Some Prominent Virginia Families. Vol. 4. Jamestown, VA: J.P. Bell Company (Incorporated).
- Foretia, Crystal (April 5, 2023). The Color of Intimacy: Marriage, Passing, and the Legal Strategies of Afro-Creole Women in Antebellum New Orleans (PDF) (Thesis). New York, New York: Columbia University Department of History. Archived (PDF) from the original on July 9, 2023.
- Frangos, Steve (June 12, 2018). "First Greek Couple of North America: Andrea Dimitry and Marianne Celeste Dragon". Ethinkos Kirikas The National Herald.
- Thompson, Shirley Elizabeth (2009). Exiles at Home The Struggle to Become American in Creole New Orleans. Cambridge, MA: Harvard University Press. ISBN 9780674023512.
- Tucker, Susan (2016). City of Remembering: A History of Genealogy in New Orleans. Jackson, MI: University Press of Mississippi. ISBN 9781496806222.
