= Andrea Dimitry =

Greek American hero in the War of 1812

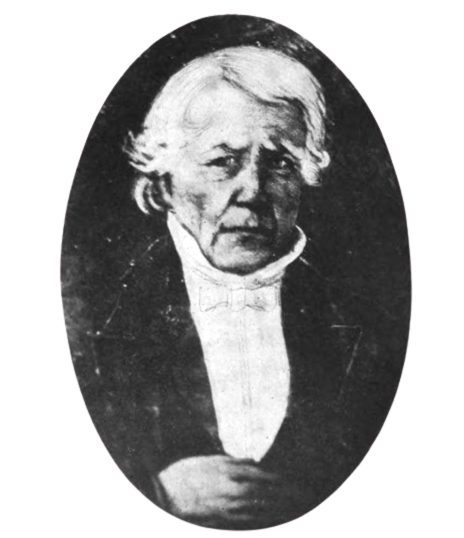
- Born: January 1775; Hydra, Greece
- Died: March 1, 1852 (aged 77); New Orleans, Louisiana, US
- Occupation: Entrepreneur
- Spouse: Marianne Celeste Dragon (m. 1799; died in 1852)
- Children: Alexander Dimitry, 9 other children
- Military career
- Allegiance: United States
- Branch: U.S. Army (Louisiana Militia)
- Service years: 1814–1815
- Rank: Private
- Conflicts: War of 1812; Battle of New Orleans

Andrea Dimitry (January 1775 – March 1, 1852), also known as Andrea Drussakis Dimitry, was a Greek refugee who emigrated to New Orleans (in Spanish colonial Louisiana) and served as a militiaman in the War of 1812.

Dimitry fought in the Battle of New Orleans. It was mis-reported in his obituary in The Delta of New Orleans that "The United States government awarded Andrea Dimitry with 1,000 acres of land for his valiant services rendered during the War of 1812." (Note: He held various important public offices with honor and distinction. "In acknowledgment of his distinguished services, the American government honored him with a grant of 1,000 acres of land on the Gulf Coast of Mississippi where he built the famous villa, "Dimitry Point".) It was his father-in-law that had been rewarded with the land grant, and his wife inherited the land.

== Early life ==
Andrea Dimitry was born on the Greek island of Hydra. He was the son of Nicholas Dimitry and Euphrosine Antonia. The Dimitry family had originally lived on the mainland of Greece. They had fled to Hydra seeking refuge from the Turks. The family name Drussakis is common on the island.

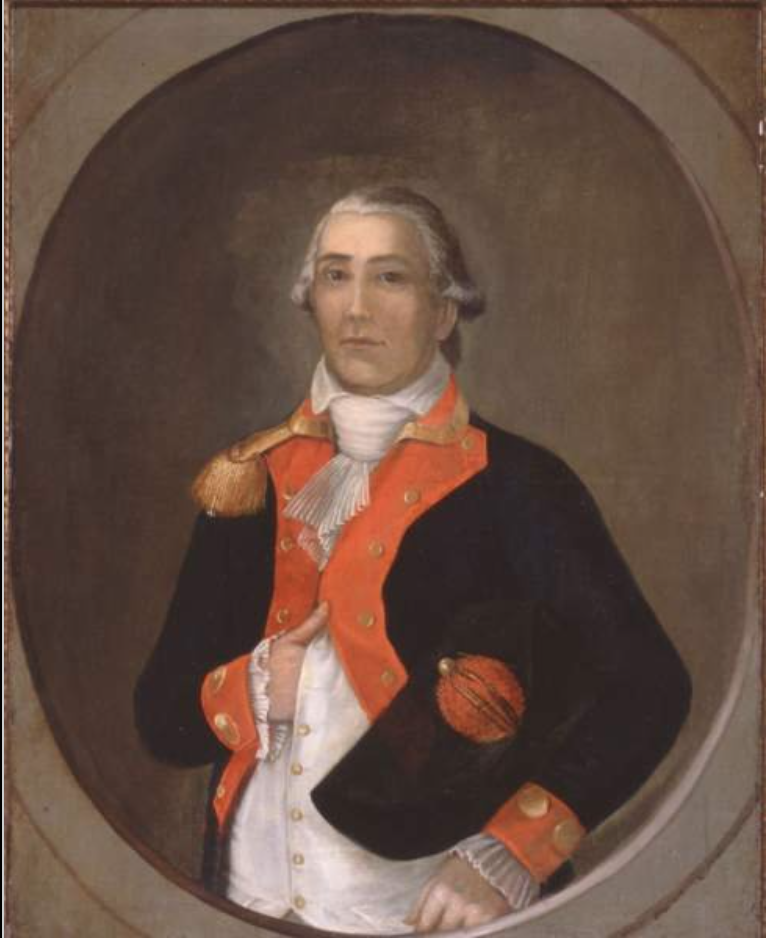
Lieutenant Michel Dragon 1810

After a long voyage traveling the world, Dimitry eventually settled in the Spanish-French New Orleans. He arrived in spring 1799, where he met a prominent Greek man named Lieutenant Michel Dragon. Dragon immigrated to New Orleans around 1760; he was a soldier in the Spanish Colonial Army.

Dimitry married Dragon's daughter Marianne Celeste Dragon in October 1799; she was listed as white on the marriage certificate, despite being mixed race. The acquisition of the territory of Louisiana by the United States from France took place in 1803, making the family officially American.

== Life in America ==
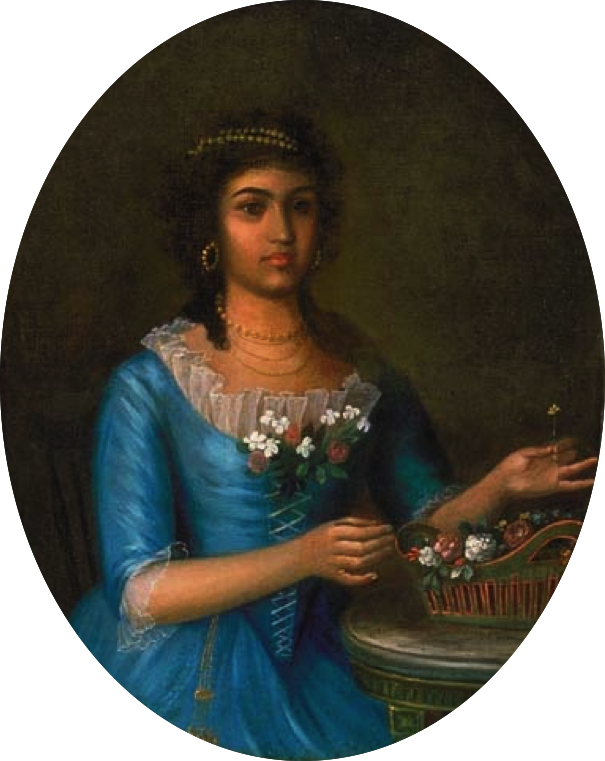
Marianne Celeste Dragon 1795

Dimitry and Marianne Celeste had ten children, including educator and author Alexander Dimitry. In the 1805 New Orleans City Directory, Michel Dragon and his wife resided at 60 Rue de Chartres. Dimitry lived next door at 58 Rue de Chartres. The street bordered Jackson Square in the French Quarter.

The War of 1812 broke out and Dimitry joined as a private in the Louisiana Militia, with whom he participated in the Battle of New Orleans. Research by Pecquet du Bellet indicates that he enlisted on December 16, 1814, and served two months and twenty-five days.

Dimitry owned a store. Marianne Celeste inherited 1,000 acres of land from her father, which he was awarded from the Spanish government for his efforts in the American Revolutionary War. (Note: "Michel Dragon was awarded 1,000 acres of land for his valiant services rendered with the Spanish military. The land was situated on the Gulf Coast of Mississippi in Harrison County. [Years later, his son-in-law] Andrea Dimitry built a villa and called the place Dimitry Point.") Dimitry's 1852 obituary records that the land was situated on the Gulf Coast of Mississippi, in Harrison County, and Dimitry built a villa there.

In 1834, Marianne Celeste filed for financial separation from Dimitry, citing financial mismanagement, and won; despite this, the couple did not file for a divorce and remained together. Marianne was 57 and Andrea was 59.

== Death and legacy ==
Dimitry died in 1852; he was 77 years old. An extensive obituary was published in the Delta newspaper on March 2, 1852. He was given a veteran's funeral. Surviving veterans of the Louisiana militia were requested to attend. A special military detachment of the Washington Artillery appeared at the family's cottage. Several military officers and civilians gathered and many people from New Orleans attended his service. The military fired cannons and muskets, and a band played in his honor. At the time there was a Greek vessel docked in New Orleans and the officers and crew in the port attended the funeral and the flags of the vessel were suspended at half-mast.

His wife Marianne Celeste died four years later on April 22, 1856. She was 79 years old.

== See also ==
- Anti-miscegenation laws in the United States
- Zephaniah Kingsley
- Marie Laveau

== Bibliography ==
- Frangos, Steve (2005). "The Dimitry Family of Fabled New Orleans" (PDF).
- Frangos, Steve (June 12, 2018). "First Greek Couple of North America: Andrea Dimitry and Marianne Celeste Dragon". Ethinkos Kirikas The National Herald.
- Kendall, John Smith (1922). History of New Orleans Volume 3. Chicago And New York: The Lewis Publishing Company – via HathiTrust.
- Koken, Paul; Constant, Theodore N.; Canoutas, Seraphim George (1995). A History of the Greeks in the Americas, 1453-1938. Proctor Publications. p. 40. ISBN 978-1-882792-15-3.
- Pecquet du Bellet, Louise (1907). Some Prominent Virginia Families Vol. 4. Lynchburg, VA: J.P. Bell Company Inc. – via archive.org.
- "Battle of New Orleans, War of 1812: American Muster and Troop Roster List" (PDF). National Park Service. Transcribed in partnership with the University of New Orleans History Department and the Midlo Center for New Orleans Studies – via wikitree.com.
