= Laugier =

Laugier is a French given name and surname, and may refer to:

- Laugier of Nice (c. 950–1032), co-lord of Nice
- Laugier d'Agoult, early 12th century bishop of Apt
- André Laugier (1770–1832), French chemist, pharmacist and mineralogist
- Henri Laugier (1888–1973), French scholar
- Léonce Laugier, Governor General for Inde française in the Second French Colonial Empire under Third Republic
- Louis Laugier (born 1965), French civil servant
- Marc-Antoine Laugier (1713–1769), Jesuit priest and architectural theorist
- Marguerite Laugier (1896–1976), French astronomer
- Pascal Laugier (born 1971), French director and writer
- Paul-Auguste-Ernest Laugier (1812–1872), French astronomer
- Robert François Laugier (1722–1793), French pharmacologist
- Sandra Laugier (born 1961), French philosopher
- Stanislas Laugier (1799–1872), French surgeon and medical doctor

== See also ==
- Honorat de Porchères Laugier (1572–1653), French poet
