= Eugene Chassaignac =

French-American composer

- Born: 1820; Nantes, France
- Died: January 25, 1878 (aged 57–58) New Orleans, Louisiana, United States
- Genre: Early American Music
- Occupations: Composer; Musician; University professor
- Instrument: Piano
- Years active: 1840–1878
- Spouse: Elvire Porche
- Notable work: War to the Yankees; Confederate Land
- Children: Charles Louis Chassaignac
- Relatives: Edouard Chassaignac

Eugène Chassaignac (1820 – January 25, 1878) was a French-American musician, professor, composer, and music critic. Eugene was a prominent member of the New Orleans community and is known for desegregating Scottish Rite Freemasonic lodges in New Orleans in 1867. Italian revolutionary Giuseppe Garibaldi personally sent Eugene a letter of praise for his courageous act of kindness towards people of color. His son Charles Louis Chassaignac became a prominent doctor in New Orleans and worked for Charity Hospital and was a humanitarian. His daughter Marie Chassaignac married Baron Randolph Natili. Natili's parents were involved in an interracial marriage and he was a member of the prominent Creole Dimitry Family. Natili became closely associated with Italian American composer Giuseppe Ferrata because of the marriage of his first cousin's daughter Alice. Natili's relationship with his father-in-law Eugene, benefited Ferrata because of Natili's knowledge and appreciation for musical composition.

Eugène was born in Nantes, France, in 1820. He studied music with French author and playwright Ludovic Halévy in Paris, France. Eugène eventually settled in New Orleans, Louisiana where he wrote about theater and music for the French-language newspapers Le Moniteur du Sud, La Chronique, Le Meschacébé, and Le Louisianais. He taught music in New Orleans and created a significant number of musical compositions, including a comic opera entitled La Nuit aux echelles, which was performed in 1850 at the Théâtre de St. Martinville. Most of his music manuscripts were destroyed in a fire in Morgan City at his wife's home after his death. Some of his compositions survived and are part of the collection of Duke University and the Library of Congress.

== History ==
Eugene was born in Nantes, France. His brother was famous French physician Edouard Chassaignac. Eugene decided to study music with composer Ludovic Halévy in Paris. Eugene migrated to New Orleans in the 1840s, where he wrote theatre and music columns for Le Meschacébé, Le Moniteur du Sud, La Chronique, and Le Louisianais. He married Elvire Porche in 1842, she was from a family of well-to-do planters. Her parents were Severin Porche (1798–1840) and Helene Porche (1800–1842), they were first cousins, and their aunt was a Creole woman named Marie Louise Porche (1736–1802). Marie was the child of an unknown slave woman with rights within the wealthy Porche family. The family was from Pointe Coupee Parish, Louisiana where Eugene and Elvire lived during the 1850s, he taught music at the Collège de la Mobile while also presenting a comic opera, La Nuit aux echelles at the Théatre de St. Martinville. By 1857, he taught music history in New Orleans and two years later along with his friend Adolphe Elie he opened a music store called Elie et Chassaignac. The two men eventually had a disagreement which almost led to a duel which was stopped by local police. Eugéne was a captain during the American Civil War for the Confederacy.

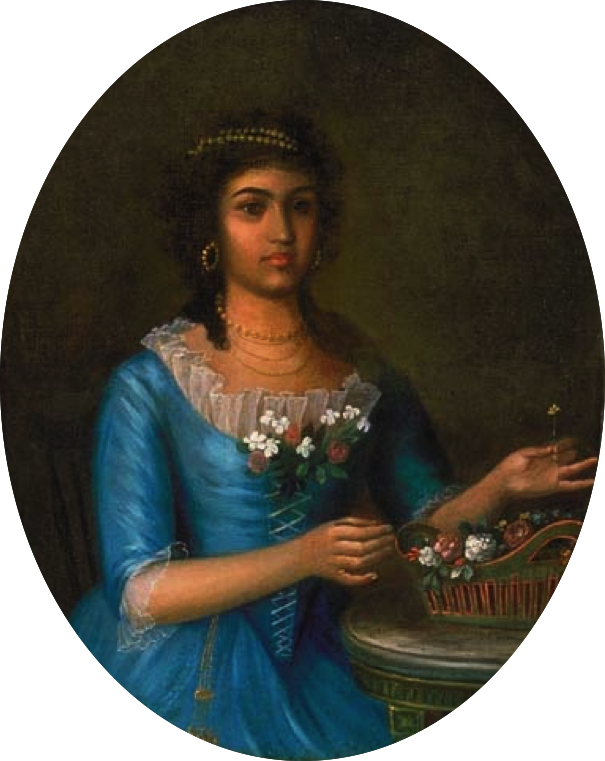
Randolph Natili's grandmother Marianne Céleste Dragon

In 1861, he was a partner in the New Orleans music publishing company Sourdes and Chassaignac. Eugene partnered with Lieutenant H.H. Strawbridge to produce Confederate Land and Lieutenant Col. A Garard to create War to the Yankees both were southern patriotic songs published in three languages. By 1864, Eugene collaborated in creating a song in New Orleans entitled Bride du Sud the text was by Louis Placide Canonge, and the music was by Eugène.

Eugene was the Grand Commander of the Supreme Council of Louisiana of the Scottish Rite of Freemasonry in Louisiana, and on May 2, 1867, he ordered that white lodges under his jurisdiction welcome all without distinction as to race or color. Eugene wanted masonry to march in the forefront of the struggle against prejudice. Around this period, Louisiana was emersed in racial violence and segregation. Louisiana rejoined the Union on July 9, 1868, and the Opelousas massacre occurred two months later. By late 1868, Eugene was given a gold Medal for desegregating the lodges. Three years later his daughter Maria married Alexander Dimitry's nephew Randolph Natili. Natili was a part of the Dimitry family and Marianne Celeste Dragon's grandson. Eugene's son, Charles Louis Chassaignac, was an important doctor in New Orleans. He was the medical examiner for the New York Life Insurance Company and district surgeon for the Illinois Central Railroad Company in New Orleans. Most of Eugene's compositions that were in the possession of his wife after his death were lost in a fire. Some of his works can be found in the collection of Duke University and the Library of Congress.

== Compositions ==
Music authored by Eugene Chassaignac
Date	Title
1850	Tell me! Dis-moi
1850	La Nuit Aux Echelles
1861	Confederate Land
1864	War to the Yankees
1864	Bride du Sud
1864	Egg-Nog Song
1865	Lu-Lu Polka
1871	Home Again Polka Mazurka de Salon : Op. 9

== See also ==
- Victor-Eugene McCarty
- Edmond Dédé

== Bibliography ==
- Thompson, Shirley Elizabeth (2009). Exiles at Home The Struggle to Become American in Creole New Orleans. Cambridge, MA: Harvard University Press. ISBN 9780674023512.
- Pecquet du Bellet, Louise (1907a). Some Prominent Virginia Families. Vol. 4. Lynchburg, VA: J. P. Bell Company (Incorporated).
- Hirsch, Arnold R.; Logsdon, Joseph, eds. (September 1992). Creole New Orleans Race and Americanization. Baton Rouge, LA: LSU Press. ISBN 9780807117743.
- Hebert, Paulette Fenderson (2021). Shake Your Tree Memoirs of Marie Claire, Always Creole and Always a Proud Colored Former Slave Owner. Bloomington, IN: iUniverse. ISBN 978-1-6632-2488-0.
- Curtis, Robert I. (2024). Sheet Music of the Confederacy A History. Jefferson, North Carolina: McFarland, Incorporated, Publishers. ISBN 9781476650760.
- Hallman, Diana R.; Leal, César A., eds. (2022). America in the French Imaginary, 1789 -1914 Music, Revolution and Race. Rochester, New York: Boydell Press. ISBN 9781783277001.
- Barthé, Jr., Darryl (July 14, 2021). Becoming American in Creole New Orleans, 1896–1949. Baton Rouge, LA: LSU Press. ISBN 9780807175521.
- Ostendorf, Ann (September 15, 2011). Sounds American National Identity and the Music Cultures of the Lower Mississippi River Valley, 1800-1860. Athens, Georgia: University of Georgia Press. ISBN 9780820341361.
- Moulton, Charles Wells, ed. (1906). The Doctor's Who's Who. New York, NY: University of Georgia Press.
- Fortier, Alceé; McGloin, Frank; Perrin, W.H.; Favrot, H.L.; Owen, W. Miller; Cross, K.A; Peytavin, John L.; Gusman, Anthony L.; Salomen, Lucien F. (1892). Biographical and Historical Memoirs of Louisiana of Louisiana Vol. 1. Chicago, Il: The Goodspeed Publishing Company.
- DeCuir, Sharlene Sinegal (2009). Attacking Jim Crow: Black Activism in New Orleans 1925-1941 (Thesis). Baton Rouge, LA: Louisiana State University. Archived from the original on August 8, 2024.
- Bentley, Charlotte Alice (October 2017). Resituating Transatlantic Opera: The Case of the Théâtre d'Orléans, New Orleans, 1819–1859 (PDF) (Thesis). Boston, Massachusetts: Emmanuel College. Archived (PDF) from the original on September 11, 2024.
- Eanes, Edward (1995). "Giuseppe Ferrata: Emigre Pianist and Composer". Baton Rouge, Louisiana: Louisiana State University. doi:10.31390/gradschool_disstheses.6094. Archived from the original on August 17, 2024.
