= Randolph Natili =

Greek-Italian creole socialite (born 1842, New Orleans)

Randolph Natili Baron
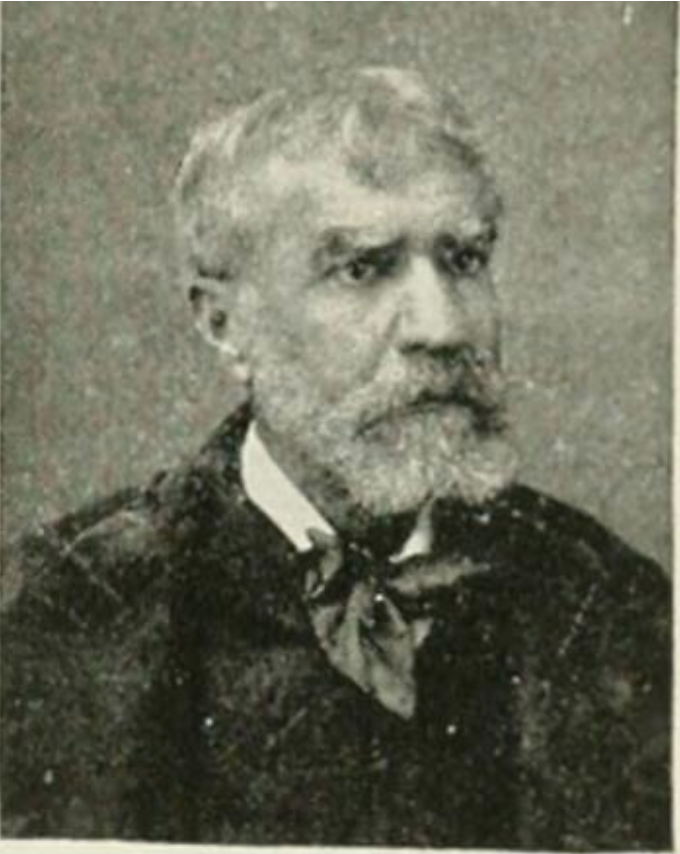
- Born: October 24, 1842; New Orleans, LA
- Died: May 10, 1915 (aged 72); Morgan City, LA
- Resting place: Morgan City Cemetery and Mausoleum
- Other names: Little Diplomate; The Baron
- Occupations: Politician; Railroad Superintendent; Art Historian
- Years active: 1870-1915
- Employer(s): Huntington Family; Southern Pacific Railroad; Morgan's Louisiana and Texas Railroad
- Spouse: Marie Chassaignac
- Children: Mary Alice Natili
- Family: Dimitry Family (Creoles)

Randolph Natili (October 24, 1842 - May 10, 1915) was a mixed-race Louisiana Creole author, politician, diplomate, special railroad agent, art collector, and socialite. He was a member of the prominent New Orleans mixed Greek Creole family known as the Dimitry Family. His father-in-law French-American composer Eugene Chassaignac desegregated Scottish Rite Freemasonic lodges in New Orleans around 1867 and Randolph's first cousin George Pandely was involved in a racial incident entitled the Pandelly Affair. Natili worked in the railroad enterprise because of his cousin superintendent Pandely. Natili was a patron of the arts and by 1900 published a book entitled Martin H. Colnaghi, Marlborough Gallery. Natili's first cousin once removed Alice married Italian American composer Giuseppe Ferrata. Natili was close friends with the Huntington family and at the time of his death is listed as receiving a salary of 25,000 a year close to one million dollars adjusted for 2024 inflation due to his close affiliation with the Huntington family.

Randolph was born in New Orleans to Doctor Auguste Natili and Mathilde Elizabeth Theophanie Dimitry their union was an interracial marriage. Randolph was raised in New Orleans and his uncle was Alexander Dimitry the first state superintendent of public education in Louisiana and U.S. ambassador to Costa Rica and Nicaragua. Randolph adopted the nickname the Baron and eventually was surrounded by America's elite. In the 1890s he toured the southern United States with President Benjamin Harrison. Randolph was closely associated with Giuseppe Ferrata's musical career for the last twenty years of his life. Ferrata named several pieces after him and his cousin Alice. Randolph had an exceptional life, due to his ethnic background it was very difficult for people of color living during the Jim Crow era because states eventually instituted the one-drop rule. His grandson was Major League Baseball pitcher and manager Eddie Dyer. A fountain was dedicated to Randolph in Morgan City around 1916 at Lawrence Park.

== Early life and ancestry ==
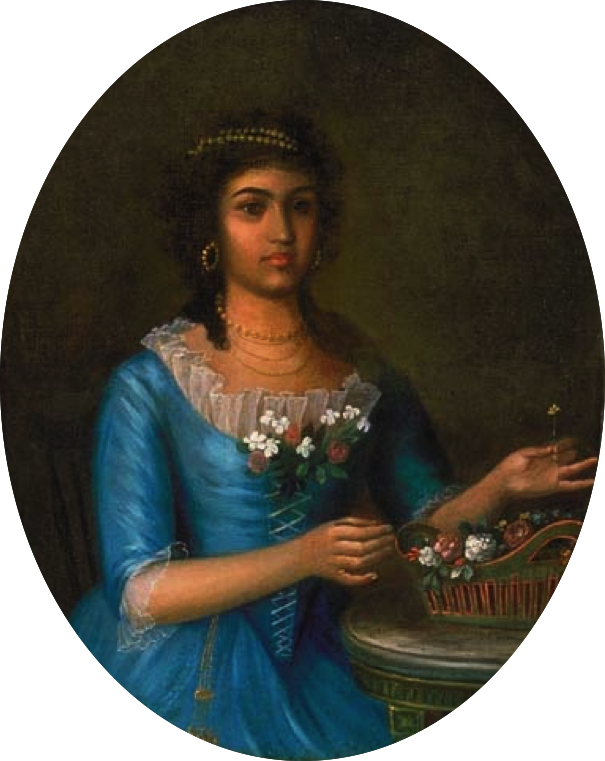
Natili's grandmother Marianne Céleste Dragon

Randolph Natili was born in New Orleans to Italian Doctor Auguste Natili and Mathilde Elizabeth Theophanie Dimitry. His father Auguste was born in Pisa in the Grand Duchy of Tuscany Italy and educated in Paris France around 1837. Randolph's parents were married on April 22, 1839, in New Orleans. Randolph's mother was Mathilde Elizabeth Theophanie Dimitry she was a member of the prominent Greek Creole Dimitry family and the ninth child of Marianne Celeste Dragon and Andrea Dimitry. Randolph's mother was the progeny of an interracial marriage. The family was involved in countless racial encounters during the 19th century. Two incidents were chronicled by the courts entitled Forstall, f.p.c. v. Dimitry (1833) and Pandelly v. Wiltz (1854).

Randolph's grandmother Marianne Céleste Dragon passed as a white person on public records because it was necessary to own property and have certain rights. Strict laws persecuted people of color and passing as white was a legal solution and her marriage records indicate that she was white. The Forstall sisters Pauline and Josephine brought Marianne to court in the 1830s because she inherited property from the Forstall family but the property was left to a woman of color named Marianne, not a white woman. The court revealed that she was posing as two different people and they wanted the white woman to return the property; consequently, the court sided with Marianne allowing her to keep her property and white status, ruling that the family had been in possession of the right to be categorized as a person not born of Negro extraction.

Randolph was around eleven years old when his first cousin George Pandely was ejected from public office due to his African heritage. Pandely was elected to the office of assistant alderman on March 28, 1853, a role similar to a city council member. Victor Wiltz accused him of not meeting the qualifications to hold public office because he was of African descent. Wiltz and a small group of concerned citizens published a detailed account of Pandely's ancestral records while Pandely falsely asserted his family was of American Indian descent. Pandely eventually resigned from public office to avoid arrest. Weeks later Pandely took Wiltz to court, the case was entitled Pandelly v. Wiltz (1854) and he sued for the right to claim American Indian ancestry and for monetary damages. The court allowed Pandely to claim American Indian ancestry but did not issue financial damages. The incident led the Dimitry family to claim descent from a fictitious, Indian princess of the Alibamu tribe named Malanta Talla to maintain their social status.

Randolph's uncle Giovanni Pieri was also a doctor who married Clina Angelica Dimitry the sixth child of Marianne Celeste Dragon and Andrea Dimitry. Pieri also attended medical school in Pisa Italy and was affiliated with Paris France similar to Randolph's father Auguste. The Dimitry Family archives have letters between Pieri and Giuseppe Mazzini dated from 1845. In the one letter, Mazzini calls Pieri a brother in the same conspiracy as Carissimo Fratello. A similar Giovanni Pieri existed, he was involved in an assignation attempt on Napoleon III entitled the Orsini affair. Pieri was also associated with Mazzini but he was supposedly assassinated by guillotine in 1858 there is a possibility that both figures are the same and that Pieri was not assassinated but lived out the rest of his life in New Orleans.

== Adult life ==
Pandely was associated with Charles Morgan's railroad company during the 1860s and remained with railroad companies for over twenty years. He was the president and superintendent of Texas and New Orleans Railroad. The Dimitry family was affiliated with the railroad enterprise. Theodore John Dimitry, Dracos Anthony Dimitry, and Randolph were affiliated with railroad companies. By the American Civil War, most of the Dimitry family fought for the Confederacy. Pandely was in control of the Pontchartrain Railroad he oversaw the transportation of supplies for Confederate forces. Alexander Dimitry, Charles Patton Dimitry, and John Bull Smith Dimitry were at Confederate headquarters in Richmond, Virginia. Randolph was a Confederate soldier who fought for the Army of North Virginia.

By 1870, Randolph is listed as the assistant freight agent while Pandely is listed as superintendent of the Texas and New Orleans Railroad. The next year he married Marie Massie Chassaignac on December 17, 1871, in New Orleans. Her brother was the well-known doctor Charles Louis Chassaignac and their uncle was Edouard Chassaignac. Charles and Marie's father was a well-known New Orleans composer named Eugene Chassaignac. Randolph's father-in-law Eugene was also involved in a highly publicized racial incident when he desegregated masonic lodges in 1867. He was immediately criticized by American Masonic lodges but was praised by Italian revolutionary Giuseppe Garibaldi. One year later he won a gold award for his courageous act of kindness. Randolph was a patron of the arts as early as 1877 Randolph and his father-in-law Eugene are listed as the owners of medieval artwork entitled Venus Anadyomène. Randolph's first cousin Virginia Dimitry Ruth wrote about a painting that same year entitled Aphrodite or Venus Restored which was published in the Daily Picayune and Louis Placide Canonge along with John Bull Smith Dimitry wrote a forty-four-page pamphlet describing the Venus Anadyomene in 1877.

In 1881, Collis Potter Huntington, acting for the Southern Pacific Railroad Company, bought the Texas and New Orleans Railroad Company as well as many other railroad companies in the southern United States. Charles Morgan died three years prior and Pandely along with Morgan's grandchildren established the Whitney Iron Works Company in New Orleans. Randolph was active within the political community and was nominated for U.S. Senator in Louisiana but was never elected. He slowly climbed the ladder at the railroad companies he was assistant to Alexander Charles Hutchinson and by 1892 Randolph was listed as president of the Iberia & Vermillion Railroad in the fall he accompanied President Benjamin Harrison on his tour of the Southwestern United States. Two years later he was an art buyer and general manager of the Morgan Lines under Henry E. Huntington. He was also involved with diplomatic relations dealing with the Panama Railroad and Huntington's interests.

Randolph's first cousin Ernest Lagarde had a daughter named Alice. Alice fell in love with a composer named Giuseppe Ferrata. She met him at Mount Saint Mary's College where Ernest was a professor in 1892. Alice encouraged Ferrata's musical career and from the onset of their relationship promoted him. Eventually, in the spring of 1894, she introduced Ferrata to her first cousin once removed Randolph. Randolph and his wife Elvira were the perfect match for Ferrata because Elvira's father was the well-known French American composer Eugene Chassaignac. According to Ferrata's biography written by Edward Eanes; Randolph was closely associated with Ferrata's musical career for the next twenty years.

Randolph was an aesthete and by 1900 published an illustrated art book entitled Martin H. Colnaghi, Marlborough Gallery. The first painting of the book was a painting of the Cretan School. The artwork was created on the Greek island of Crete while the island was under Venetian occupation. The Cretan School flourished from 1400 to 1700. From 1900 until the time of his death, Randolph had a special relationship with the Huntington family and continued to serve them.

== Relationship with Giuseppe Ferrata ==
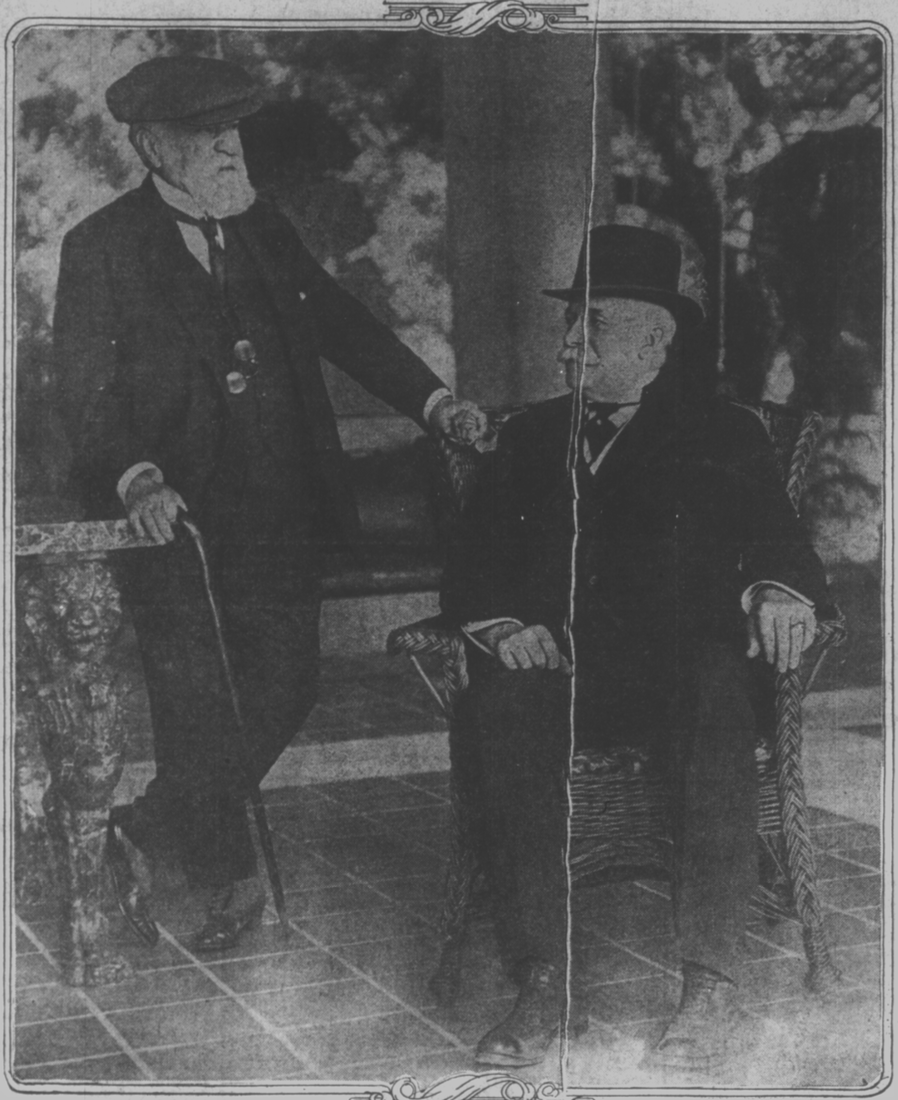
Ferrata's supporters Henry E. Huntington (seated) with Baron Randolph Natili

Recall Randolph's father-in-law was French American composer Eugene Chassaignac. Randolph was a connoisseur of the arts and his wife Maria was an opera singer. According to Edward Eanes's biography on Giuseppe Ferrata, the composer heavily relied on his relationship with the Dimitry family for support. Randolph was closely associated with the Huntington family: Collis Potter Huntington, Helen Manchester Huntington, Archer Huntington, and Henry E. Huntington but Archer and his wife Helen were directly associated with Ferrata and his career. Helen's mother was a hymnwriter named Ellen Maria Huntington Gates and the sister of Collis Potter Huntington. Archer Huntington was Collis Potter Huntington's stepson. Archer married Collis' niece Helen Manchester she was Archer's step-cousin.

From the onset of Ferrata and Randolph's relationship a reception was organized for the composer at the Mayer Hotel in Baton Rouge on May 31, 1894. The gathering included over one hundred guests featuring sixteen state senators and legislators. Ferrata performed his pieces and the guests were impressed by the composer. Ferrata dedicated a song entitled "Baron Natili" Gavotte to his new relative, and around the same period, Randolph gave him a Steinway grand piano for Christmas 1894.

In 1902, Randolph and Ferrata spent part of the summer in New York City. Ferrata initially met Helen and Archer when he gave a private performance at their home and performed Folk Songs from the Spanish. Helen and Archer were Spanish scholars and at the suggestions of Randolph, Helen provided the text for his piece Folk Songs from the Spanish. Randolph was hoping to secure funding from the wealthy couple for Ferrata's future compositions. By 1909, Ferrata took a position in New Orleans the city belonging to the Dimitry family, he was in their home town and it was a city the Creole family helped establish 100 years prior. Randolph was related to countless members of the family who were scattered all over the city.

== Reputation as a joker ==
Not only did the Dimitry family accomplish the task of portraying fabricated American Indian historical figures out of sociological necessity. Randolph adopted the nickname Baron and in one public instance convinced New Orleans high society types that he was attending a prominent opera with a diplomatic representative of the Chinese emperor who was on his way to Havana to evaluate the conditions of Chinese laborers and merchants in Cuba. Years later Randolph revealed that the Chinese gentleman in his company at the opera was the cousin of the owner of washhouses in New Orleans. Randolph was known for bending the truth and playing jokes on his high society contemporaries which was chronicled in his biographical content. Towards the end of his life, he lived the highest level of grandiosity, and years before his death his salary was 25,000 close to one million dollars adjusted for inflation and he shared the company of Europe and America's wealthiest socialites never disclosing his African heritage.

== Literary Works ==
- Randolph, Natili (1900). Martin H. Colnaghi, Marlborough Gallery. ASIN 1014990823.

== See also ==
- Michael Dracos Dimitry
- Ion Hanford Perdicaris
- Huntington Library

== Bibliography ==
- Foretia, Crystal (April 5, 2023). The Color of Intimacy: Marriage, Passing, and the Legal Strategies of Afro-Creole Women in Antebellum New Orleans (PDF) (Thesis). New York, New York: Columbia University Department of History. Archived (PDF) from the original on July 9, 2023.
- Pecquet du Bellet, Louise (1907a). Some Prominent Virginia Families. Vol. 4. Lynchburg, VA: J. P. Bell Company (Incorporated).
- Christophe, Landry (August 18, 2018). "Mixed Marriages In Louisiana Creole Families 164 marriages" (PDF). Louisiana Historic & Cultural Vistas. Archived (PDF) from the original on February 9, 2023.
- Thompson, Shirley Elizabeth (2009). Exiles at Home The Struggle to Become American in Creole New Orleans. Cambridge, MA: Harvard University Press. ISBN 9780674023512.
- Maddox, Joseph H. (August 4, 1853a). "Evidence of Lineage The Pandelly Affair". New Orleans Daily Crescent, Volume 6, No. 129. New Orleans, Louisiana: New Orleans Daily Crescent. p. 3, col. 2. Archived (PDF) from the original on August 25, 2023. "The Pandelly Affair"
- Tucker, Susan (2016). City of Remembering: A History of Genealogy in New Orleans. Jackson, MI: University Press of Mississippi. ISBN 9781496806222.
- Wilkinson, Joseph B. (1890). Wilkinsons̓ Report on Diffusion and Mill Work in the Louisiana Sugar Harvest of 1889-90 (Feb 22, 1890). New Orleans, Louisiana: Brandao & Gill Book and Job Printers.
- Eanes, Edward (1995). "Giuseppe Ferrata: Emigre Pianist and Composer". Baton Rouge, Louisiana: Louisiana State University. doi:10.31390/gradschool_disstheses.6094. Archived from the original on August 17, 2024.
- Canonge, Louis Placide (1877). The Venus Anadyomene A Resurrected Gem of Mediaeval Art. New Orleans, LA: Chassaignac & Natili.
- Natili, Randolph (1900). Martin H. Colnaghi, Marlborough Gallery (PDF). London, UK: The Marlborough Gallery.
- Kneedler, H. S. (1895). Through Storyland to Sunset Seas What Four People Saw on a Journey Through the Southwest to the Pacific Coast. Chicago, IL: Knight, Leonard & Company, Printers.
- Field, Henry Martyn (1886). Blood is Thicker Than Water A Few Days Among Our Southern Brethren. New York, NY: George Munro Publishers.
- Mudd, Richard Dyer (1970). The Mudd Family of the United States Volume 2. Utica, KY: McDowell Publications.
- Poor, Henry V. (1870). Manual of the Railroads of the United States 1870-1871 Volume 3. New York, NY: H.V. & H.W. Poor.
- Hirsch, Arnold R.; Logsdon, Joseph, eds. (September 1992). Creole New Orleans Race and Americanization. Baton Rouge, LA: LSU Press. ISBN 9780807117743.
- Robison, Betty J.; Mcchesney, Robert Michael; Holman, Harold J.; Streva, Sandra Ann; Matson, Joyce; Berniard, Stephen Anthony; Stansbury, Anita L., eds. (1960). A History of Morgan City Louisiana. Morgan City, LA: The Morgan City Historical Society.
