= Richelot =

Richelot is a surname. Notable people with the surname include:

- Friedrich Julius Richelot (1808–1875), German mathematician
- Gustave-Antoine Richelot (1806–1893), French physician
