= Mary T. Reiley =

American poet

Mary Trimble Reiley (May 15 or May 17, 1858 – October 16, 1878) was an American poet. Her poems included one about the slaughter of John Gair. She was the daughter of John Arndt Reiley. He was a minister who also died in 1878 of yellow fever along with some of her siblings.

She graduated from the State Normal School in Trenton, New Jersey in 1878 "with the highest standing of any graduate of the institution up to that time." She had poems published in the New York prior to her death and after her death her teacher and friend Miss Mathews published a 276 page volume of her poems in 1879.
