= Victor-Eugene McCarty =

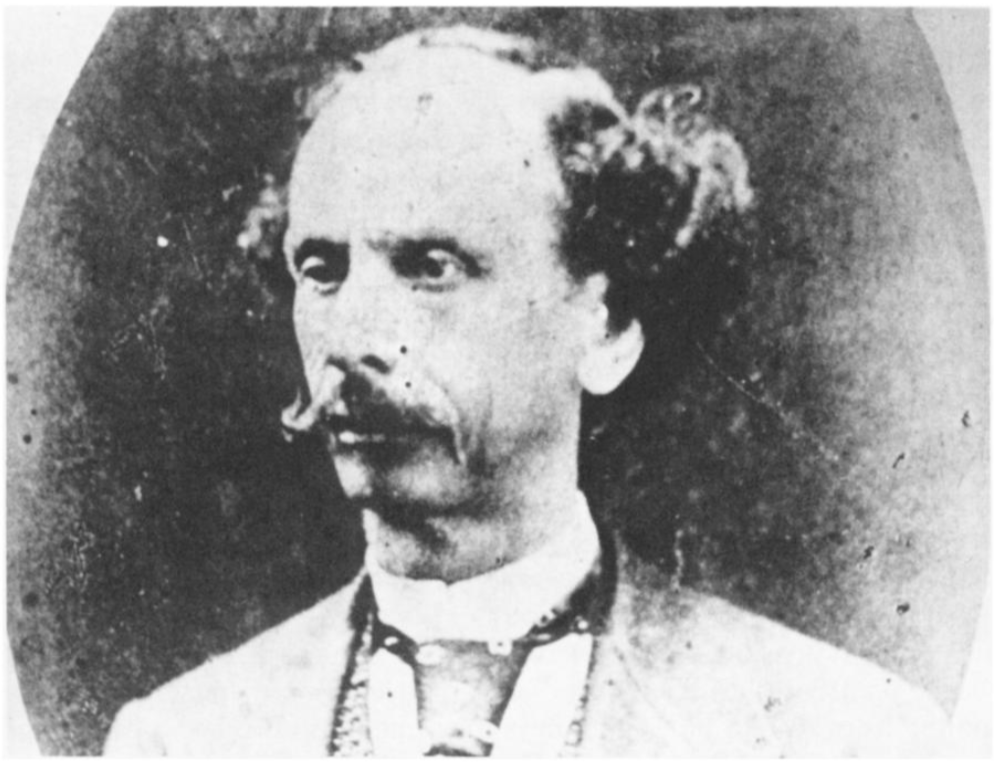
Victor-Eugene McCarty

Victor-Eugène McCarty (1817 - 1881) was a Louisiana Creole singer, pianist, amateur actor, comedian, orator and writer. McCarty was a civil rights activist who held a seat in the Louisiana House of Representatives and was one of the first of several prominent free black composers. The musician frequently spoke at Creole meetings to advise them of their civil rights during the early phases of Reconstruction. He is best known for publishing Fleurs de salon: 2 Favorite Polkas in 1854 in New Orleans.

In the 1840s he was among the first black men to study music abroad, at the Paris Conservatory. McCarty did not publish as widely as many of his fellow Creole composers of the era, but he was well known for performing and organizing other musicians, and playing a role in Reconstruction-era politics.

He served on a school board when he was targeted by white supremacist White Leaguers opposed to integration. They had also driven African American state legislators out of office and assassinated one of them, John Gair. McCarty was beaten near death and spent months recovering as a refugee.

== History ==
Victor-Eugene McCarty was born to a wealthy banker named Eugène Theodore McCarty. His father had relationships with three women of color in New Orleans. Victor's mother was Héloise Croy, a refugee from Saint-Domingue or modern-day Haiti. His mother was a woman of color and a slave owner. Victor was raised in a wealthy household and studied piano in New Orleans under Professor J. Norres. McCarty tried to enroll in the prestigious Imperial Conservatory of Paris for music, but he was beyond the age requirement; luckily, he used his wealthy status and political connections to attend the institution. He was not listed in the school's records but was allowed to audit the required courses thanks to the intervention of Pierre Soulé. McCarty studied vocal music, harmony, and composition. The McCartys were considered one of the elite Creole families of New Orleans. Victor was the only family member to devote himself to radical politics following the emancipation of the slaves.

McCarty made political statements using his performances to benefit and raise money for black New Orleanians around 1865. One of the performances was on May 10, where he performed on behalf of an orphanage for freedpeople; the vocal performance of Quasimodo was an ode to Victor Hugo's famous character from The Hunchback of Notre-Dame, a piece composed by black composer Edmond Dédé. From early Reconstruction, McCarty sided with the North and supported radical Republicans. By December of 1866, McCarty served on the Orleans Parish Board of Police Commissioners. He was forcibly removed on the evening of January 19, 1869, from a performance of The Barber of Seville at the New Orleans French Opera House along with Eugene Staes, a Confederate veteran of Shiloh turned Radical Republican. A civil rights case ensued, known as the McCarty affair, and by 1870, McCarty was elected to the Louisiana House of Representatives Sixth District in 1870 and served one term for two years.

A Creole of color of Haitian descent named Louis Placide Canonge took over the French Opera House from the 1872-1873 and 1873-1874 seasons. The opera house was open to all audiences from 1872-1873 but due to the efforts of the White League it became segregated by the next season 1873-1874. McCarty helped launch a boycott that shuttered the opera house for its racially exclusive seating policies in 1875, which led to its closure. Canonge surrendered the French Opera House and was bankrupt by January 1875. A second civil rights case ensued because a man with colored blood was deprived access to the opera house this time involving John Eugene Staes the son of Eugene Staes, Staes lost the case.

McCarty lost his job as a clerk in the Second Municipal Police Court after the Republicans left New Orleans sometime around 1877 for his safety, and three years later, he was listed as a teacher in West Baton Rouge, living in a rented room. When he returned to New Orleans to visit his son in 1881, he was in extremely poor health and died of a stroke at his son Gustave's home.

== Bibliography ==
- Sullivan, Lester (1988). "Composers of Color of Nineteenth-Century New Orleans: The History behind the Music" (PDF). Black Music Research Journal. 8 (1). Chicago, Illinois: Center for Black Music Research - Columbia College Chicago and University of Illinois Press: 51–82. doi:10.2307/779503. JSTOR 779503.
- Wyatt, Lucius R. (1990). "Six Composers of Nineteenth-Century New Orleans" (PDF). Black Music Research Journal. 10 (1): 125–140. doi:10.2307/779547. ISSN 0276-3605. JSTOR 779547.
- Kein, Sybil (2000). Creole The History and Legacy of Louisiana's Free People of Color. Baton Rouge, LA: LSU Press. ISBN 9780807142431.
- Horne, William I. (Fall 2018). "Victor Eugène Macarty: From Art to Activism in Reconstruction-Era New Orleans". The Journal of African American History. 4 (103). Chicago, Illinois: University of Chicago Press: 496–525. doi:10.1086/699950.
- Baroncelli, J.G. de (1906). Le Théâtre-Français, à la Nlle Orleans Essai Historique [The French Theater in New Orleans Historical Essay]. New Orleans, LA: Geo. Muller Printing House.

== Other works cited ==
- Koskoff, Ellen, ed. (2000). Garland Encyclopedia of World Music, Volume 3: The United States and Canada. Garland Publishing. ISBN 0-8240-4944-6.
- Southern, Eileen (1997). Music of Black Americans. New York: W.W. Norton & Co. ISBN 0-393-03843-2.
