= Alfred Mercier =

American writer

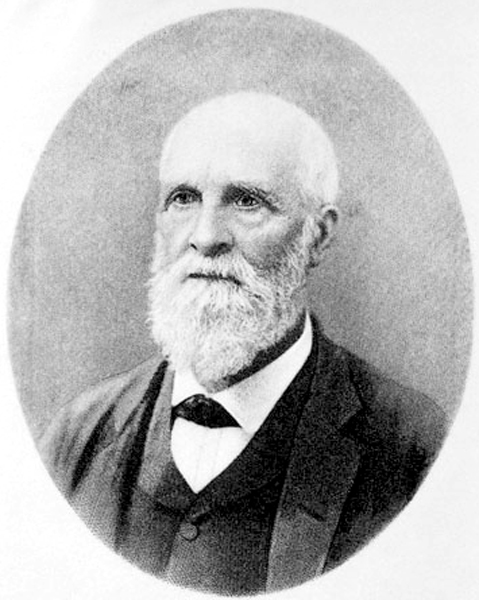
- Born: Jean Justin Charles Alfred Mercier; June 3, 1816; New Orleans, Louisiana
- Died: May 12, 1894 (aged 77); New Orleans, Louisiana
- Occupations: Novelist; Doctor
- Spouse: Virginie Vezian (m. 1849–1894)
- Writing career
- Notable work: Étude sur la Langue Créole en Louisiane

Alfred Mercier (June 3, 1816 - May 12, 1894) was a Creole doctor, poet, playwright, novelist, and philosopher. He spoke Greek, Latin, French, and Louisiana Creole. He wrote seven French novels and is considered a post-American Civil War author and contributor to the literature of New Orleans. His first novel was Le Fou de Palerme written in 1873. His works featured a broad range of topics including clerical celibacy, abortion, and slavery and its aftermath. Alfred corresponded with French scholars such as Eugène Rolland and folklorist Henri Gaidoz. He founded Athénée Louisianais in 1876 which was a cultural association. In 1887 he completed a play entitled Fortunia Drame en Cinq Actes (Fortunia A Five Act Drama). Alfred's half-first cousin was Creole playwright Louis Placide Canonge and his half-uncle was Jean François Canonge. His sister married French American senator Pierre Soulé and Alfred completed his biography entitled Biographie de P. Soulé, Sénateur à Washington (Biography of P. Soulé, Washington Senator) in 1848.

Alfred was born in New Orleans to Jean Baptiste Mercier and Marie Helouise Mercier. His half-aunt was a Creole woman named Amelie Mercier who passed as white. He left New Orleans and studied in Paris at Lycée Louis-le-Grand an institution his cousin Louis Placide Canonge also attended around the same period. Alfred spent half his life going back and forth to Paris publishing his first works and studying medicine in the city. He also traveled all over Europe several times. Around the time of the American Civil War, he supported the Confederate cause attempting to gain support from France for the South. Alfred returned to New Orleans towards the end of the 1860s where he completed the first linguistic description of Louisiana Creole entitled Étude sur la Langue Créole en Louisiane (Study on the Creole Language in Louisiana).

== History ==
Alfred Mercier was born in the McDonough neighborhood of New Orleans on June 3, 1816, to Jean Baptiste Mercier and Marie Helouise Mercier and his half-uncle was judge Jean François Canonge and half-aunt Creole woman Amelie Mercier who passed as white. His half-first cousin was playwright Louis Placide Canonge and his sister Henrietta Armantine Mercier was the wife of Senator Pierre Soulé. When Alfred was fourteen he traveled to France where he was educated around 1830 at the Lycée Louis-le-Grand the same institution his cousin Louis attended. Twelve years later in 1842, Alfred published a volume of poems in Paris entitled La Rose de Smyrna (The Rose of Smyrna), and L'Ermile de Niagara (The Hermit of Niagara), which were highly praised in the city. He traveled to, Switzerland, Italy, Spain, Belgium, and England he was particularly fond of Sicily which is exhibited in his writings. In 1848, he wrote a biography on French American senator Pierre Soulé which was in French. Alfred studied medicine in Paris and by 1853 was a member of the American Medical Society in the city. He returned to New Orleans in the mid-1850s where he practiced medicine until the outbreak of the American Civil War returning to Paris in 1859. By the end of the American Civil War, he returned to New Orleans in the late 1860s joining the literary group of Southern Writers. He completed seven novels including his first novel Le Fou de Palerme, his final work was Henoch Jedesias ou les Mystères de New York in 1893 one year before his death.

== Literary works ==
Books and articles authored by Alfred Mercier
Date	Title in French	Title in English
1842	La Rose de Smyrna et L'Ermile de Niagara	The Rose of Smyrna and The Hermit of Niagara
1848	Biographie de P. Soulé, Sénateur à Washington	Biography of P. Soulé, Washington Senator
1860	La Fièvre Jaune, Sa Manière D'Être à L'égard des Êtrangers à la Nouvelle-Orléans et Dans les Campagnes. Quelques Mots Sur Son Passé et son Avenir en Europe	Yellow Fever, Its Manner of Being Towards Strangers in New Orleans and in the Countryside. A Few Words on Its Past and Future in Europe
1863	Du Panlatinisme. Nécessité d'une Alliance Entre la France et la Confédération du Sud	On Pan-Latinism. Necessity of an Alliance Between France and the Southern Confederation
1873	Le Fou de Palerme	The Madman of Palermo
1877	La Fille du Prêtre: Récit Social	The Priest's Daughter: Social Narrative
1880	Étude sur la Langue Créole en Louisiane	Study on the Creole Language in Louisiana
1881	L'habitation Saint-Ybars ou, Maitres et Esclaves en Louisiane, Rećit Social	The Saint-Ybars Estate or, Masters and Slaves in Louisiana, Social Narrative
1887	Lidia	Lidia
1887	Fortunia Drame en Cinq Actes	Fortunia Drama in Five Acts
1890	Reditus et Ascalaphos	Reditus et Ascalaphos
1891	Johnelle	Johnelle
1893	Henoch Jedesias ou les Mystères de New York	Henoch Jedesias or the Mysteries of New York

== See also ==
- Charles Patton Dimitry
- Nihilism

== Bibliography ==
- Mcaleb, Thomas (1894). The Louisiana Book Selections from the Literature of the State. New Orleans, LA: R.F. Straughan.
- Kent, Charles William, ed. (1909). "Alfred Mercier". Library of Southern Literature Alcée Fortier. Madison-Murfree. Vol. 3. Atlanta, Georgia: The Martin and Hoyt Company.
- Gipson, Jennifer (2019). "Fiction as a Forum for Critical Reflections on Folklore: The Case of Alfred Mercier's L'Habitation Saint-Ybars (1881)". Baton Rouge, LA: Louisiana Folklife Program. Archived from the original on March 3, 2024.
- Cashell, Mary Florence (2008). "Postcolonial writing in Louisiana: surpassing the role of French traditionalism in Alfred Mercier's L'habitation Saint-Ybars". Baton Rouge, Louisiana: Louisiana State University. Archived from the original on July 12, 2024.
- Kent, Charles William, ed. (1909a). "The Novel". Library of Southern Literature. Dixon-Glasgow. Vol. 4. Atlanta, Georgia: The Martin and Hoyt Company.
- Fortier, Alcée (1909b). History of the Literary and Intellectual Life of the Southern States. Vol. 7. Richmond, Virginia: The Southern Historical Publication Society.
- Kein, Sybil (2000). Creole The History and Legacy of Louisiana's Free People of Color. Baton Rouge, LA: LSU Press. ISBN 9780807142431.
- Fertel, Rien (2014). Imagining the Creole City The Rise of Literary Culture in Nineteenth-Century New Orleans. Baton Rouge, LA: LSU Press. ISBN 9780807158241.
