= Giuseppe Ferrata =

Italian-American composer

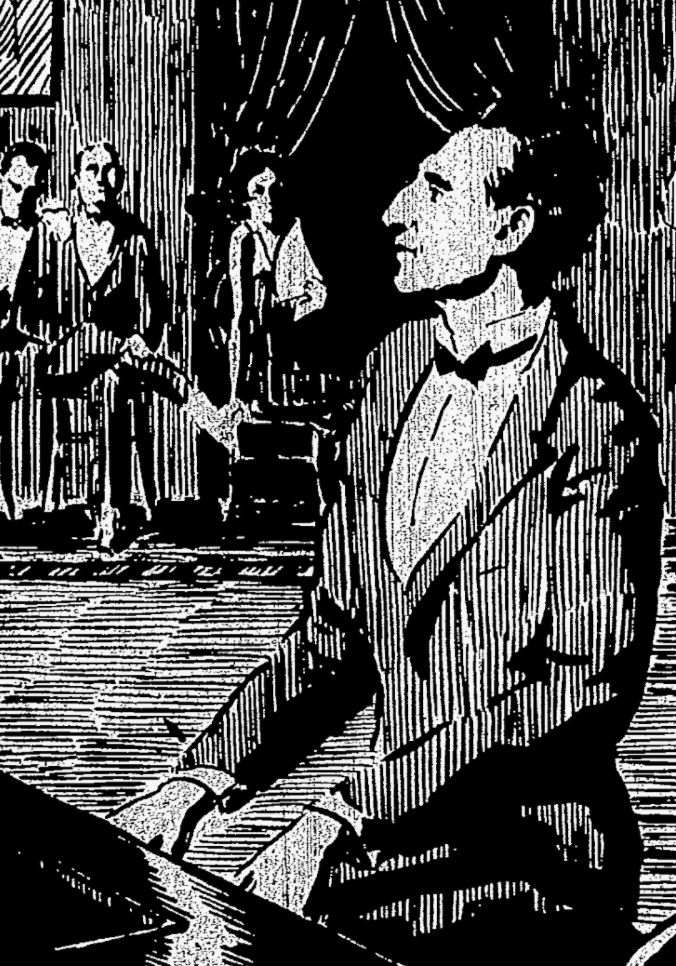
- Ferrata playing piano in New Orleans in 1924

Background information
- Also known as: G.F. Casimiro Virowski (pseudonym)
- Born: January 1, 1865; Gradoli, Italy
- Died: March 28, 1928 (aged 63) New Orleans, Louisiana, United States
- Occupations: Composer; Musician; University professor; Inventor
- Instrument: Piano
- Years active: 1886–1928
- Spouse: Alice Lagarde
- Other name: Peppino
- Parent(s): Paolo Ferrata; Lucia Donati
- Relatives: Domenico Ferrata
- Family: Dimitry Family (Creoles)

Giuseppe Ferrata (1865–1928) was an Italian-American pianist, composer, and university professor. He was a student of Giovanni Sgambati and Franz Liszt at the Accademia Nazionale di Santa Cecilia (English: National Academy of Saint Cecilia) in Rome, Italy. Ferrata was knighted by the Royal Court of Portugal, the Royal Court of Belgium, and the King of Italy.

Although Ferrata was productive in his early career in Italy, his most notable contributions occurred following his emigration to the United States, especially his time as a professor at Tulane University in New Orleans, Louisiana. His opera "Il Fuoruscito" (English: "The Outcast") won accolades including a significant financial award as part of the Sonzogna Prize.

Ferrata composed for two different audiences. Some of his works were composed for their popular appeal. Other compositions were intended to advance orchestral music as a musical art form, for audiences that were musicians, other composers, and people with deep appreciation of orchestral music.

Ferrata was also an inventor, having obtained three United States Patents.

== Early life and education ==
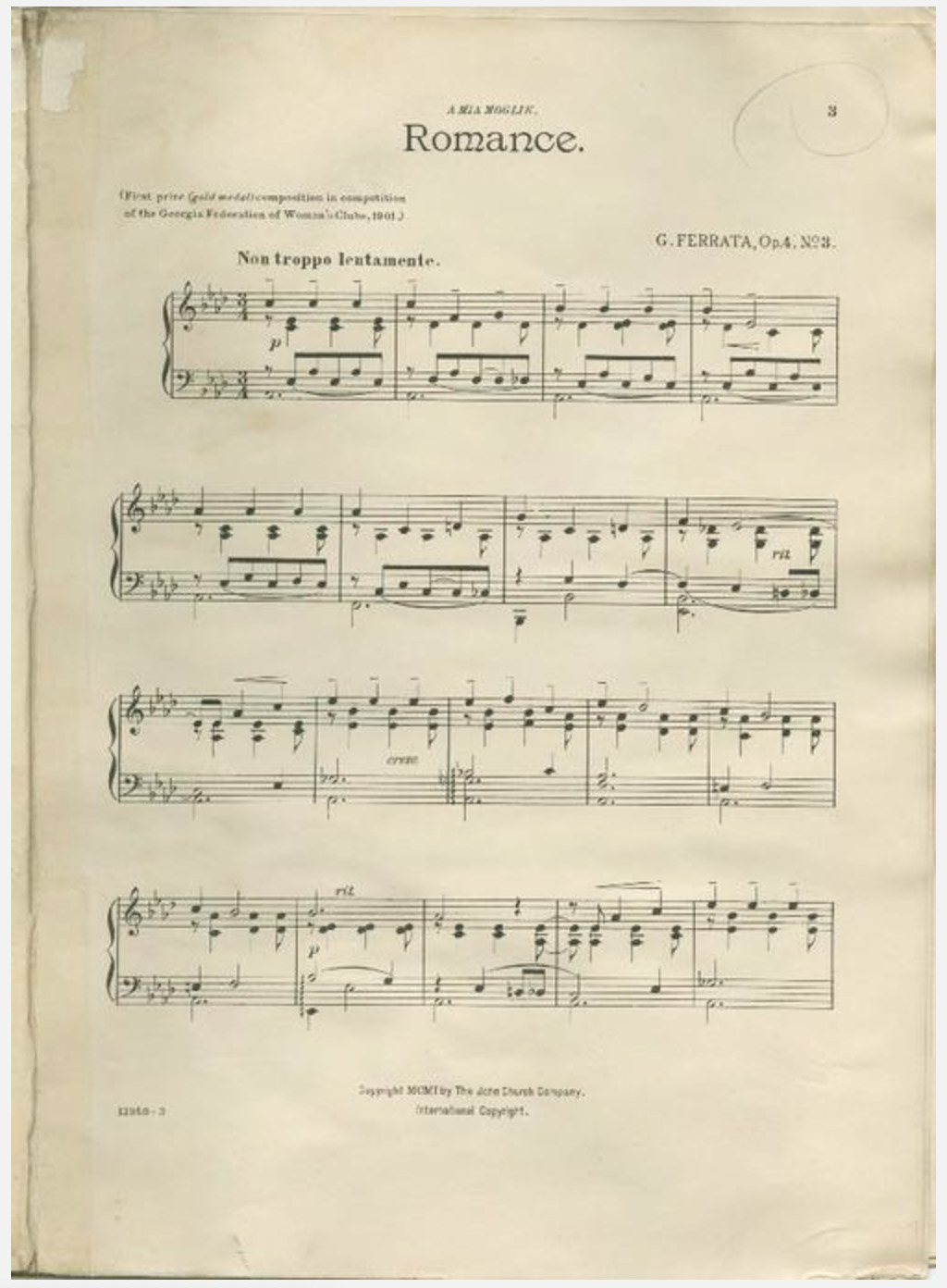
First page of the musical score for "Romance", a composition by Ferrata in 1901

Ferrata was born in Gradoli, Italy, to a family of small landowners. His parents were Paolo Ferrata and Lucia Ferrata (née Donati), and he was the oldest of nine children. As a small child in his hometown, his original intent was to become a Roman Catholic priest. His parents encouraged this, equipping him with a chapel in the home which he used to deliver homilies to neighbors' children. His uncle Domenico Ferrata already joined the priesthood and influenced his desire to become a priest.

Ferrata became enamored with music on hearing a performance by the band of the Italian Army in his hometown. Thereafter, Ferrata's father arranged for music lessons for him.

Ferrata played the clarinet. Later in his childhood, he served as assistant conductor for the local municipal band. By age 14, he earned a scholarship to pursue his training as a musician and composer at the Accademia Nazionale di Santa Cecilia.

Ferrata initially studied piano with Giovanni Sgambati and musical composition with Antonio Terziani at the Accademia Nazionale di Santa Cecilia and then later while still at the academy with Franz Liszt. Ferrata had auditioned for Liszt who then invited Ferrata to study with him, the studies lasting three years, until nearly the time of Liszt's death (1886).

On his 1886 graduation from the academy, Ferrata won several awards, for performance and for composition. At that time, he became a member of the Royal Philharmonic Academy of Rome and participated both as soloist and as conductor. In a 1904 account, Liszt is quoted as assessing Ferrata's ability as follows:

"He [Ferrata] is even now an artist of great distinction, and bids fair to distinguish himself still further.’’

== Emigration ==
Roman Catholic Cardinal Domenico Ferrata, who was Giuseppe Ferrata's uncle, arranged for Ferrata's emigration to the United States, reportedly so as to dissuade Ferrata from a marriage considered undesirable by his family. He intended to marry a woman of a different religious heritage, and his family believed such a marriage would hamper Ferrata's career.

Upon his immigration to the United States in 1892, Ferrata was met by Cardinal James Gibbons of Baltimore, Maryland, who arranged for Ferrata's faculty appointment at Mount St. Mary's College in Maryland. He subsequently took up a succession of college teaching posts related to music and musical composition.

== Academic career ==
Ferrata served on the faculty of Mount Saint Mary’s College from 1892 to 1893. During his brief time there, he taught music, including voice, performed at the college and elsewhere in the United States, and concentrated on learning the English language, of which he knew little prior to his immigration.

Ferrata then moved to Greenville Female College in South Carolina where he worked as a Music Department faculty member from 1894 until 1900. There, he had a hectic teaching schedule and recital schedule. He also suffered financial difficulties during this time. Ferrata briefly left the Greenville Female College, during his contract, to teach at the Nashville Conservatory of Music and became a shareholder of the conservatory despite his financial difficulties. He developed significant national recognition during his tenure at the Greenville Female College, from other musicians and for awards received

Ferrata subsequently was on the faculty at Brenau College and Conservatory in Georgia until 1902. At the time, Brenau College and Conservatory was a for-profit institution, and Ferrata had part ownership. During his tenure there, he also served as director of the Georgia Music Festival. He continued to gain recognition for his performances and compositions.

Afterwards Ferrata received a faculty appointment at Beaver College in Pennsylvania until 1907. At the time, Beaver College was an extension center of the New York Conservatory of Music. While at Beaver College, he became acquainted with Victor Herbert, then conductor of the Pittsburgh Symphony. The two collaborated on creating orchestral versions of some of Ferrata's songs composed for a popular audience.

In 1909, Ferrata joined the faculty of H. Sophie Newcomb Memorial College which was the coordinate women's college of Tulane University. His title was professor of piano and composition. He remained on the faculty there until the time of his death. The New Orleans French Opera House was still in operation at the time and was the largest opera house in the United States outside of the northeast region of the United States. Ferrata reportedly believed that this could be a venue for performances of his operatic compositions which was one of Ferrata's principal goals. This goal and the fact that his wife was a native of New Orleans were part of the appeal for Ferrata to join the faculty at Newcomb College of Tulane University.

As a faculty member at Tulane University, Ferrata taught courses covering composition, instrumentation, and conducting. He additionally taught piano sightreading and piano reperatory interpretation.

During the course of his academic career, Ferrata frequently traveled to Italy in order to promote his music.

As a music instructor, Ferrata authored a book of scales and of exercises to improve musical technique.

=== New Orleans musical culture ===
New Orleans had been a major music center in the United States through the 19th century, with many musicians with European training living and performing there. Even though the musical focus of New Orleans was shifting to Jazz in the early 20th century, significant interest in orchestral music continued in the city for much of the duration of Ferrata's career. He performed publicly in New Orleans from the beginning of his career there for which he gained significant local recognition.

Ferrata became active in the Louisiana Music Teachers Association. At one meeting of the association in 1911, Ferrata described the melodic qualities of composer Richard Wagner, during which he articulated three essential qualities of a composer. These are: Knowledge of what has been composed before the point of departure, Intellect, and Sense of esthetic beauty. He further contended that all three qualities are seldom embodied to a high degree in a single individual.

=== Inventions ===
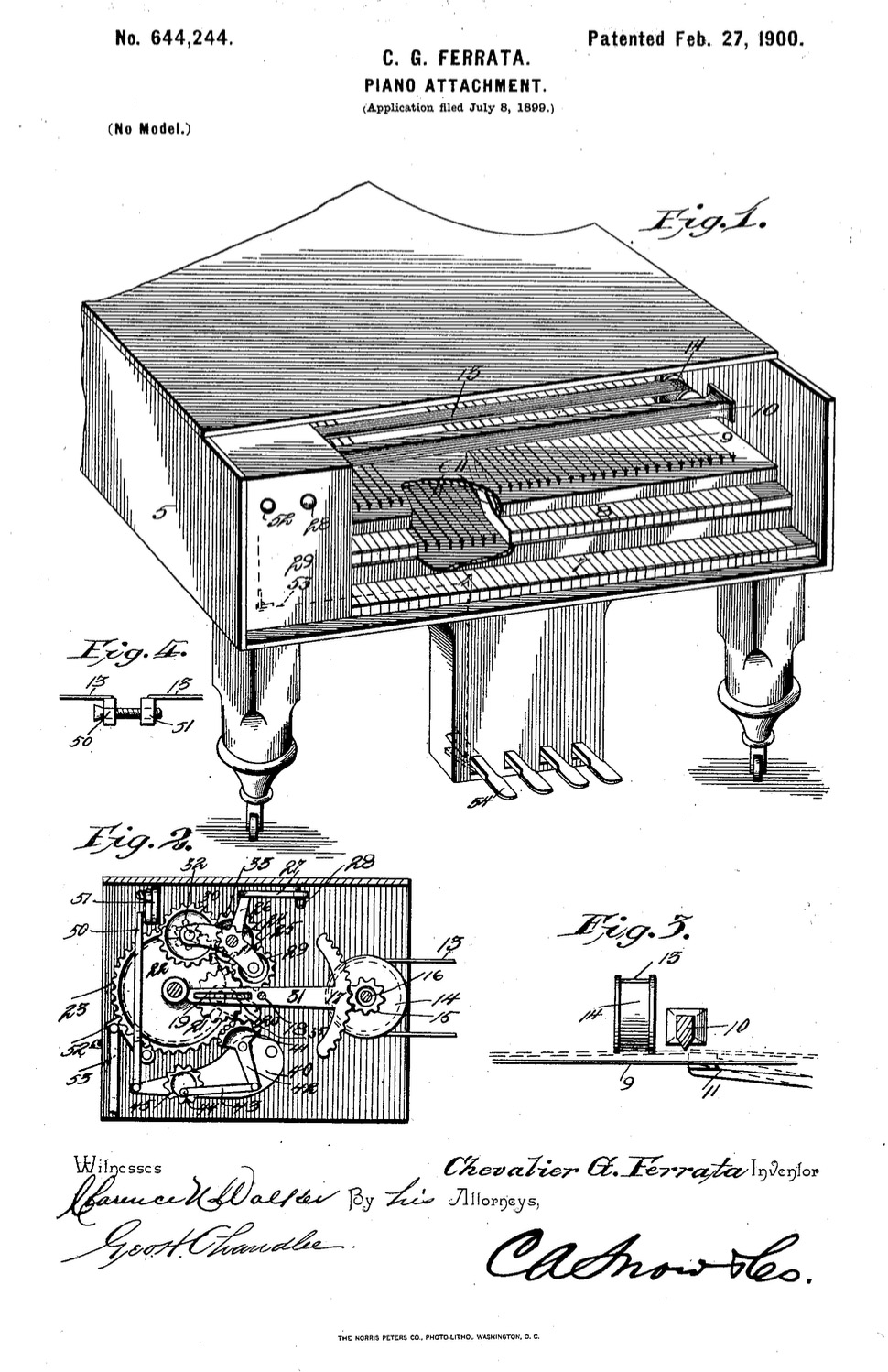
Figures from Ferrata's United States Patent 644244 showing his piano attachment invention

Ferrata was awarded three United States Patents. One of these was for his invention of a piano attachment which enables the piano to bow a string like a violin and producing a sound like a violin. The United States Patent and Trademark Office published the patents with the inventor's name as "Chevalier Giuseppe Ferrata" in apparent recognition of his knighthood, which he had already earned.

Ferrata also invented a type of ventilated shoe heel that provided extra comfort and a novel type of pipe for smoking tobacco. Whether any of Ferrata's inventions were manufactured commercially is uncertain. All of Ferrata's patent applications occurred while he was a faculty member at the Greenville Female College.

== Compositions ==
External media
- Media links for Giuseppe Ferrata

Images
- Photographs of Ferrata (from Find A Grave)

Video
- “Sull' Organetto, Op. 4 No. 4", as performed by pianist Philip Sear (YouTube)
- Study No. 2 after Chopin Waltz Op. 64 No. 1, as performed by pianist Martin Jones (YouTube)

Ferrata's compositions covered a range of musical genres, from light songs, to solo piano works, masses, string quartets, and operas, with about 300 works in total. He composed approximately 70 musical works for piano or violin, operas, and a symphonic poem.

Some of Ferrata's works were composed prior to his emigration to the United States. Ferrata was a member of the Royal Philharmonic of Rome for four seasons, and his original compositions were first published during this portion of his career. These were published by G. Ricordi, with 11 works published at that time. Others were rejected by Ricordi because of excessive complexity and therefore perceived lack of marketability. While still in Italy, Ferrata often used a pseudonym, G.F. Casimiro Virowski. The G.F. in the pseudonym are Ferrata's true initials. One historian (Eanes) has reported that Ferrata chose to use this pseudonym while still in Italy because the name sounded Polish and therefore could be useful for marketing purposes, consistent with the Biblical passage that a "prophet is without honor in his own country."

Ferrata's musical compositions were published by G. Ricordi (Milan, Italy), John Church (Cincinnati, Ohio), G. Schirmer, Inc. (New York City), and J. Fischer & Brothers (New York City), with most of the publications occurring by 1920.

Late in his career, Ferrata composed works influenced by Jazz Music. These were sometimes orchestrated versions and were influenced by other musicians such as Paul Whiteman. An example of his Jazz compositions is "Bolsheviki Jazz", a piano duet which Ferrata considered to be a humorous piece. During this period of his career, he also often publicly performed contemporary music composed by others.

One of Ferrata's objectives was for his operas to be performed by a major opera company. Due to the risk averse nature of opera production by the early 20th century that made them reluctant to perform operas unproven before audiences, he did not achieve this objective.

=== Notable performances ===
Album Leaves Gavotte Op. 11 No. 1 the first part of four compositions for Piano published by Giuseppe Ferrata in 1903.

Victor Herbert conducted the premiere of a portion of Ferrata's Italian Spring Melodies in 1905. Leopold Stokowski included several of Ferrata's works in a 1936 tour of the Philadelphia Orchestra. Of Ferrata's popular music compositions, Night and the Curtains Drawn and Messe Solenelle were widely performed in the United States during Ferrata's lifetime.

As a performer himself, Ferrata played piano in a special performance to honor Queen Margherita in 1888 at the Teatro Constanzi, which is the Rome Opera House.

During his time in New Orleans, Ferrata performed publicly many times. This included recitals for faculty at Tulane University, as well as for charitable causes in and around the city of New Orleans. In particular, he performed at a fund raiser for a building campaign at neighboring Loyola University of New Orleans. At times, his performances were broadcast locally by WWL-AM radio, with radio broadcasting being fairly new at the time. Ferrata sometimes served as guest conductor for the New Orleans Philharmonic Orchestra. Some of the performances were of Ferrata's own compositions. Another charitable cause for which he had conducted was the Louisiana Commission for the Blind. He also conducted the Minneapolis Symphony.

=== Selected compositions ===
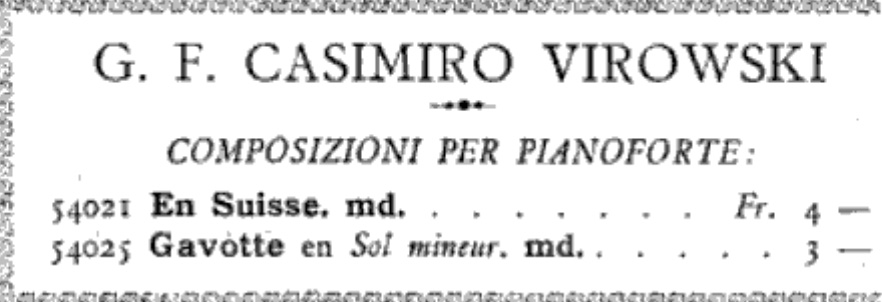
At times, Ferrata used the pseudonym G.F. Casimiro Virowski.

- Il Fuosocito (opera)
- Akrimane (opera)
- Nella Steppe (opera)
- Folk Songs from the Spanish (vocals)
- Humoreskes (a group of piano solos)
- Serenata Romanesca (piano solo)
- Bolsheviki Jazz (piano solo)
- Italian Spring Melodies (chamber music)

A more complete list of Ferrata's compositions is given by Eanes.

== Personal life ==
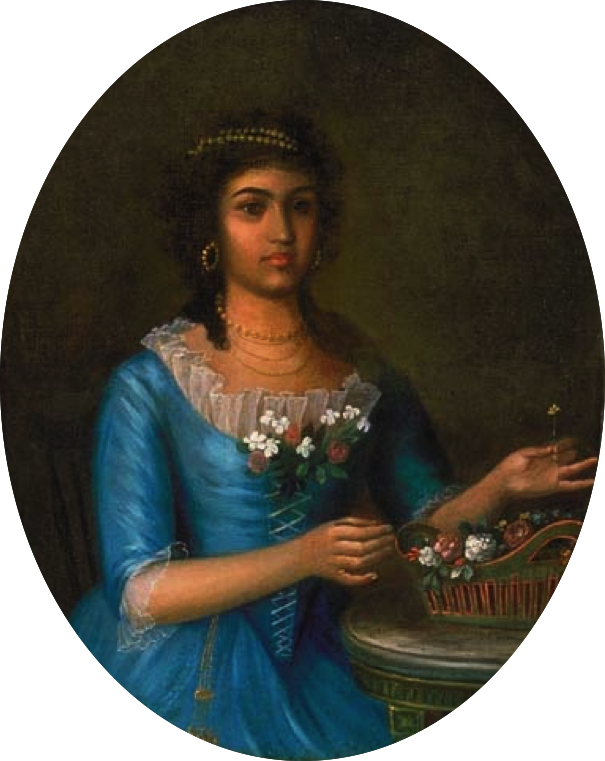
Alice Lagarde's great grandmother Marianne Céleste Dragon

While a professor at Mount St. Mary's College, Ferrata married New Orleans native Alice Lagarde. Lagarde's father was a Creole man named Ernest Lagarde, he was a professor of English Literature at the college, and the couple met through activities of the college. They were married in the Baltimore Basilica on September 29, 1893. The couple eventually had seven children together. Alice's father Ernest Lagarde was a member of the prominent Creole Dimitry family. The family was from New Orleans and they underwent countless hardships of racism. Alice's great grandmother was Marianne Celeste Dragon.

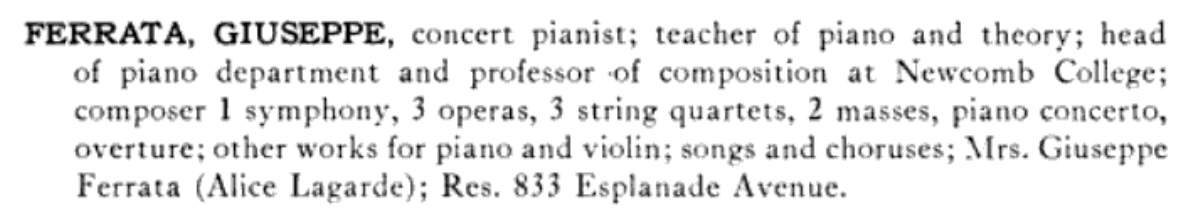
Notice in the Musical Blue Book of America (1915) mentioning his wife Alice Ferrata and listing their home address in New Orleans

As of 1915, Ferrata and his family lived on historic Esplanade Avenue in New Orleans. Ferrata's family often traveled with him to Italy for his trips to promote his musical compositions. During World War I, prior to involvement of the United States in the conflict, Ferrata returned to the United States in mid-1914, prior to his family due to responsibilities to the university. The changing global politics resulted in his family being unable to return to the United States, and the family was separated for more than a year during the uncertain political situation.

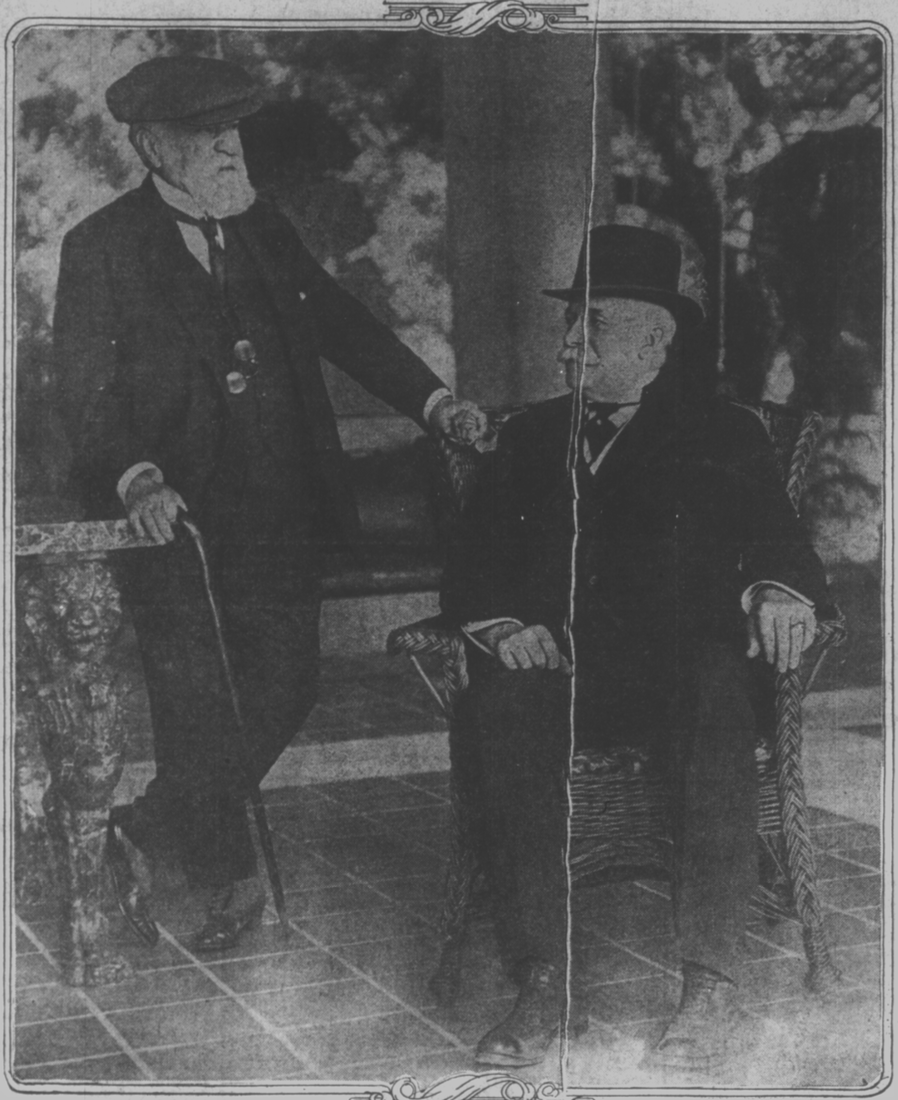
Ferrata's supporters Henry E. Huntington (seated) with Baron Randolph Natili

During his career, Ferrata had other patrons besides Cardinal Ferrata. These included Baron Randolph Natili of Louisiana, a well-connected, art dealer whom Ferrata first met during a stop in Louisiana for his marriage honeymoon. Natili's first cousin was Ernest Lagarde and he was a member of the Dimitry Family. Natili's mother was Mathilde Elizabeth Theophanie Dimitry daughter of Marianne Celeste Dragon and his father was Italian-born Doctor Auguste Natili. Randolph was Creole and the progeny of an interracial couple with powerful connections in Louisiana and within the Huntington railroad magnet family. Randolph was close to Ferrata and tried to secure funding to help his cousin Alice's husband.

Ferrata's first performances in Louisiana were during this visit, in Baton Rouge and in New Orleans.

Ferrata became a citizen of the United States on June 13, 1916, through a Certificate of Naturalization. This is in conflict with the statements in Ferrata's patents issued years before that he was already a citizen of the United States.

In 1924, the New Orleans Item newspaper described Ferrata's personality as:

"An aristocrat without snobbishness, a man of tremendous intellect, yet able to take part in the everyday affairs of life, a charming host, a delightful conversationalist; this is the real Dr. Ferrata. The real Dr. Ferrata whom you find at home on Sunday afternoon, surrounded by his wife and children, and perhaps several Italian friends, all thought of decorations and honors thrust aside, in the midst of a spirited discussion. And occasionally there will be an outburst of laughter, for the Doctor is naturally witty, and this sense of humor must find an outlet."

Ferrata died on March 28, 1928, of a lung disease. He is buried at St. Louis Cemetery No. 3, one of the Historic Cemeteries of New Orleans.

== Honors and legacy ==
Ferrata was awarded knighthood at age 20 by the Royal Court of Portugal and later by the Royal Court of Belgium. He was again knighted in 1908 by King Vittorio Emanuele III of Italy. The King of Italy also admitted Ferrata into the Order of the Crown in 1914.

Other awards and recognition that Ferrata received included: The Music Teachers' National Association Competition (1897), the Sonzogno Opera Competition of Milan (1903), and the Art Society of Pittsburgh Competition (1908).

In 1900, the State University of New York awarded an honorary degree to Ferrata.

Portrait artist Maurice Fromkes painted a portrait of Ferrata in 1915, which is maintained by Tulane University. Former students created the "Circolo Ferrata", an organization formed after his death to promote his works.

Ferrata was the subject of a doctoral dissertation by music historian Edward Eanes. The dissertation was subsequently published as a book, Giuseppe Ferrata: Émigré Pianist and Composer (ISBN 978-0810835009).

== See also ==
- Eugene Chassaignac

== Bibliography ==
- Eanes, Edward (1995). "Giuseppe Ferrata: Emigre Pianist and Composer". Baton Rouge, Louisiana: Louisiana State University. Archived from the original on August 17, 2024.
- Pecquet du Bellet, Louise (1907a). Some Prominent Virginia Families. Vol. 4. Lynchburg, VA: J. P. Bell Company (Incorporated).
- Fischer, Joseph; Fischer, Ignaz (1914). An Anniversary Souvenir From J. Fisher and Brother 1864-1914 Giuseppe Ferrata (PDF). New York, NY: J. Fisher and Brother. Archived (PDF) from the original on September 2, 2024.
