= Supreme Council of Louisiana =

The Supreme Council of Louisiana is a Scottish Rite branch of Freemasonry founded in 1839. The Supreme Council of Louisiana has chartered lodges in 11 US states.

== History ==
=== Beginnings ===
The Supreme Council of Louisiana was founded in New Orleans in 1839 in the aftermath of the Morgan Affair. During this time, the Northern Masonic Jurisdiction consisted of John James Joseph Gourgas and Giles Fonda Yates who were "effectively a Supreme Council of two people" and were completely inactive from 1832 to 1843. Likewise, the Grand Commander of the Southern Jurisdiction, Moses Holbrook longed to "relinquish his responsibilities as Sovereign Grand Commander" moving to the rural frontier of Florida to serve as a doctor.

It was during this period that the Supreme Council of Louisiana emerged, which claimed its authority via "Cerneauism" – a type of Scottish Rite Masonry without ties to the either the Northern or Southern Jurisdictions.

=== Concordant of 1855 ===
Foulhouze resigned “both as Grand Commander and member of this Supreme Council” on July 30, 1853. In 1855, a concordat was sent to Charleston on January 31, 1855, and signed on February 6, 1855, by Grand Commander John H. Honour, Lieutenant Grand Commander Charles M. Furman, and Grand Secretary General Albert G. Mackey. It was then taken back to New Orleans, likely by Mackey, and signed there on February 17, 1855, by Grand Commander Charles Claiborne, as well as Samory and Laffon de Ladébat. On the same day the Supreme Council at Charleston issued a warrant to “our well-beloved, Princes and Knights” Claiborne, Samory, Laffon de Ladébat, John H. Holland, and others, creating a Grand Consistory of Louisiana, and installing them as officers with all the powers relative thereto.

=== Continued existence ===
However, on October 7, 1856, a year after the Supreme Council of Louisiana had formed its concordat with Charleston, Foulhouze, Thomas Wharton Collens, and J.J.E. Massicott, who all resigned in 1853, “declared the Supreme Council to be still in existence and continued its works.”

Foulhouze would be expelled by the Grand Orient of France in 1859, then under the leadership of Lucien, 3rd Prince Murat. Murat had been appointed the head of Freemasonry by his cousin Napoleon III, who had seized power by force in 1851. Foulhouze and the Supreme Council of Louisiana, in turn, rejected the leadership of Murat.

In 1867, the Supreme Council of the Louisiana was the first predominantly white Masonic organization to allow ex-slaves and people of color to become members. In response to the decision, Giuseppe Garibaldi, also a Freemason, complimented the Supreme Council on their decision for racial integration.

In 1868, the Grand Orient of France, under the leadership of Émile Mellinet, re-recognized the Supreme Council of Louisiana. In response, in 1870, the Northern Masonic Jurisdiction and Southern Jurisdiction suspended relations with the Grand Orient of France.

=== 20th century ===
In 1883, Albert Pike wrote a treatise decrying the actions of Foulhouze with respect to the Supreme Council of Louisiana specifically and Cerneauism more generally.

During the 19th and 20th century, the council had fraternal relations with Masonic organizations in Mexico, Italy, Haiti, Egypt, Belgium, Cuba, Scotland, and France.

In 1907, Homer Plessy earlier the plaintiff in the United States Supreme Court case Plessy v. Ferguson served as secretary of the organization.

Under the leadership of George Longe from 1938 to 1985, the Supreme Council of Louisiana tripled in size and expanded to other states, including Maryland and New York. His papers related to the history of the organization and its work during this period are held at the Amistad Research Center of Tulane University.

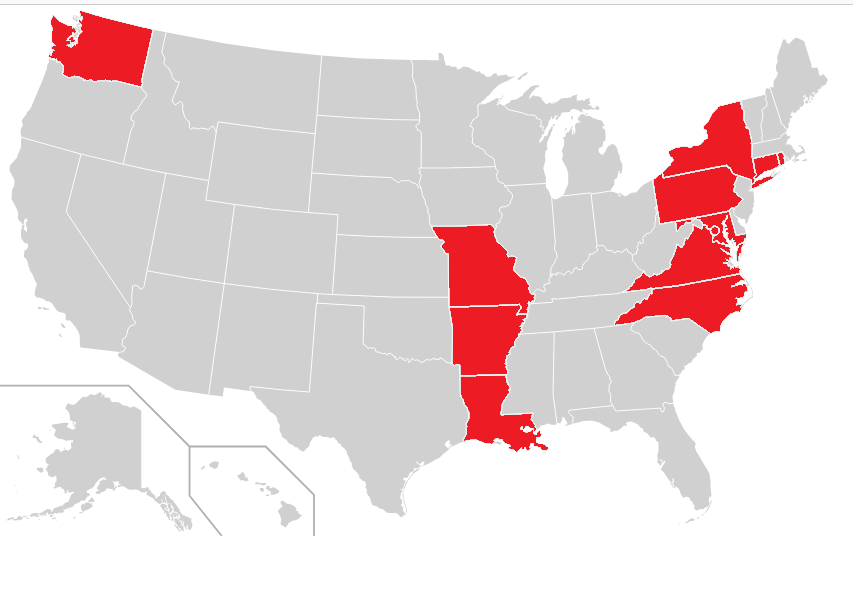
States in which the Supreme Council of Louisiana is present as of 2023

During the 1940s, its headquarters was located at 315 South Rampart Street in New Orleans, Louisiana.

Since 1973, its headquarters has been located at 3200 Saint Bernard Avenue.

=== 21st century ===
In 2005, its headquarters was damaged by Hurricane Katrina and it was abandoned. It was subsequently torn down in 2014. Challenges with the city's zoning regulations delayed construction of a new headquarters until 2022.

In recent years, Masonic scholars Alain Blenheim and S. Brent Morris, along with Arthuro de Hoyos and Michael Poll have conducted research into the history of the organization.

== Leadership ==
The list of Sovereign Grand Commanders who have led the organization are as follows:

Number	SGC	Years in office	Number	SGC	Years in office
1	Orazio de Attellis	1839–1842	12	Arthur J. Guiranovich	1889–1891; 1894–1915
2	Jean Jacques Conte	1842–1845	13	Joseph N. Cheri	1891–1893
3	Jean François Canonge	1845–1848	14	Rene Achille Chiapella	1893; 1893–1894
4	James Foulhouze	1848–1854; 1857–1867	15	O.A. Giovanni	1893
5	Charles Clairborne	1854–1856	16	George Ulysses Maury	1915–1923; 1925–1926
6	Jean Jacques Edouard Massicot	1856–1857	17	Rene C. Metoyer	1923–1925; 1926–1937
7	Eugene Chassaignac	1867–1872	18	Charles W. Vance	1937–1938
8	Edouard Marc	1872–1875	19	George Longe	1938–1985
9	Armand Bertel	1875–1876; 1877–1887	20	Joseph Williams	1987–1993
10	Jean Gentil	1876–1877	21	Philip Washington, Sr.	1993–2017
11	M.J. Piron	1887–1889	22	Eddie L. Gabriel, Sr.	2017–present

== Gallery ==
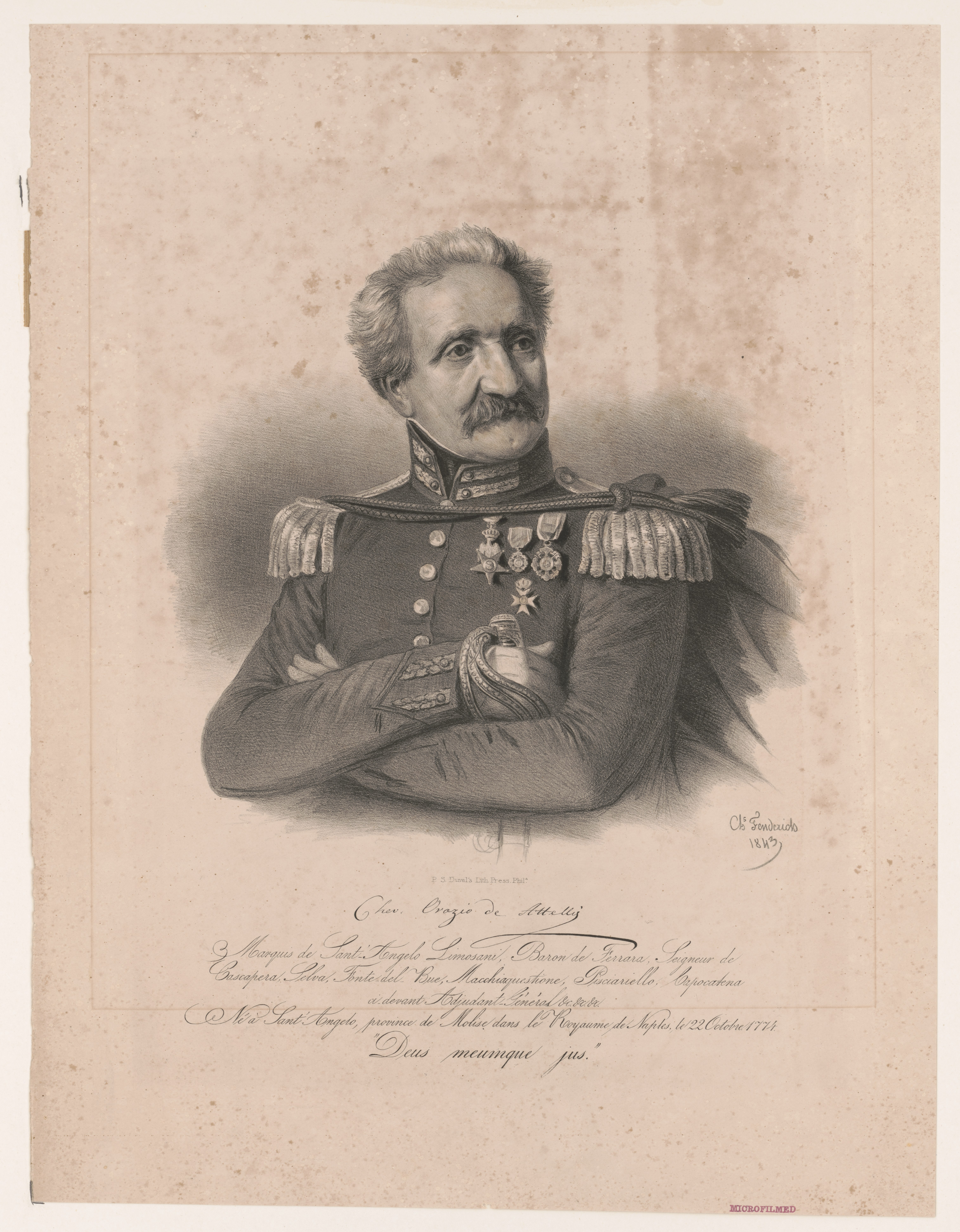
Orazio de Attellis, Founder and Sovereign Grand Commander, 1839–1842

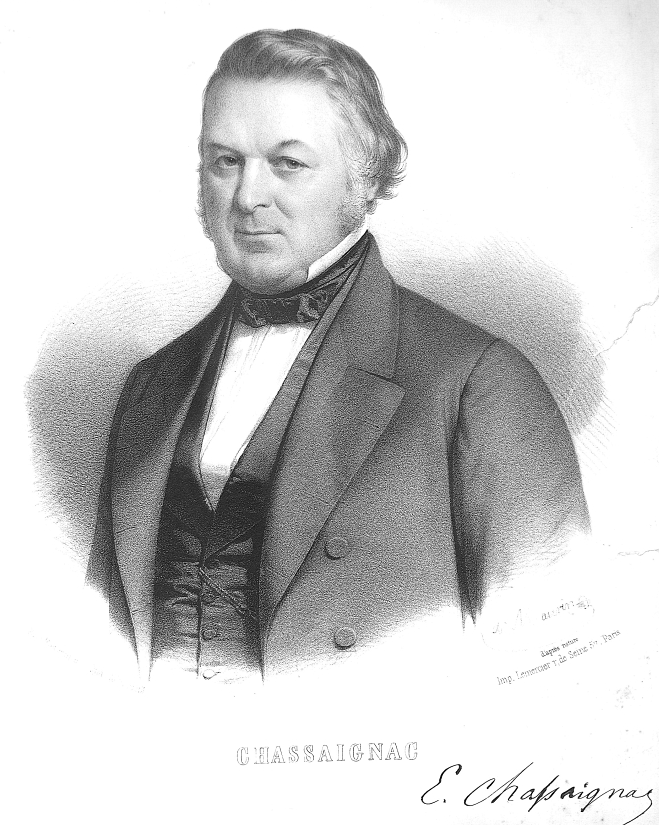
Eugène Chassaignac, Sovereign Grand Commander, 1867–1872

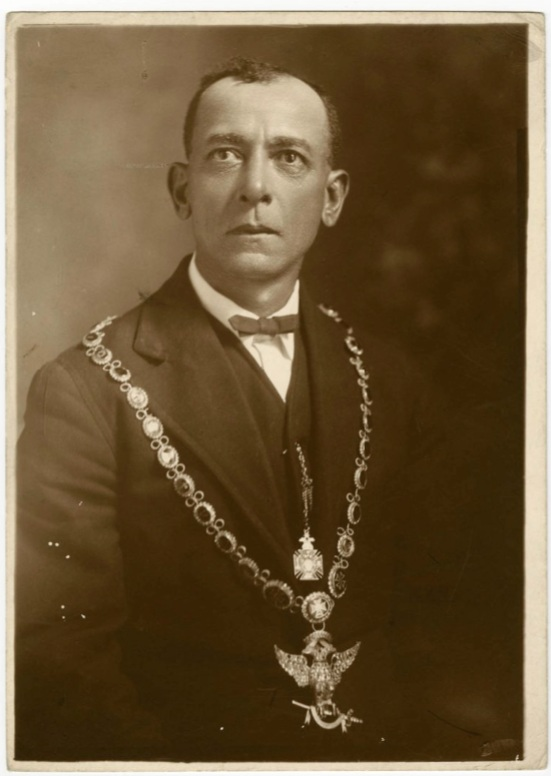
George Ulysses Maury, Sovereign Grand Commander, 1915–1923

== See also ==
- Scottish Rite
- Supreme Council, Northern Jurisdiction
- Supreme Council, Southern Jurisdiction
