= Louis Placide Canonge =

American playwright and politician

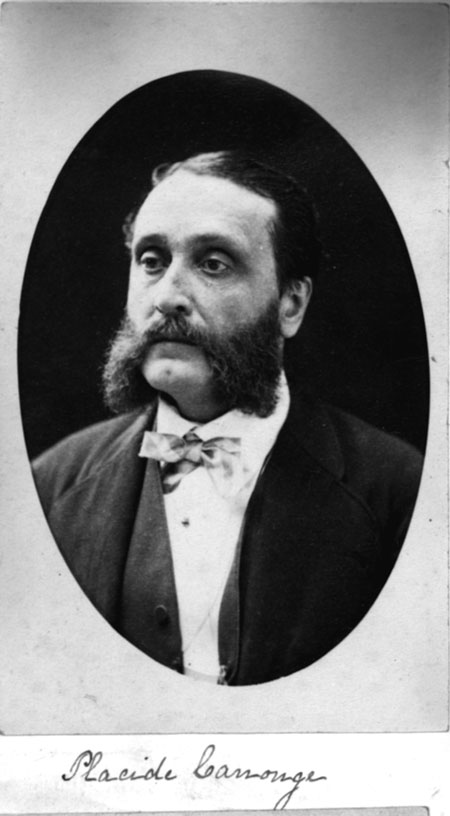

Louisiana House of Representatives
- In office 1849–1851

Louisiana House of Representatives
- In office 1888–1892

Personal details
- Born: Louis Placide Canonge; June 29, 1822 New Orleans, Louisiana
- Died: January 22, 1893 (aged 70) New Orleans, Louisiana
- Party: Democratic-Conservative
- Other political affiliations: Whig
- Spouse: Heloise Louisa Halphen (m. 1840–1885)
- Writing career
- Occupations: Journalist; Playwright; Opera House Director
- Notable work: Le Comte De Carmagnola

Louis Placide Canonge (June 29, 1822 - January 22, 1893) was a Louisiana Creole journalist, politician, playwright, actor, librettist, and lyricist. His most celebrated play, Le Comte De Carmagnola, appeared in Paris for one hundred nights. He regularly contributed to New Orleans newspapers some included: L’Abeille, Louisiana Lorgnette, Le Propagateur Catholique, Le Courrier De La Louisiane, La Presse and many more. Canonge is known for participating in two infamous duels involving theater. Canonge translated Nojoque A Serious Question For A Continent into a French version entitled Nojoque Une Grave Question Pour Un Continent. The book violently features the use of the word negro and subjugates their community; it was written by Hinton Rowan Helper. Canonge uses the translation to voice his discontent with reconstruction and the status of the negro; in contrast, he wrote lyrics for Francois-Michel-Samuel Snaer a Creole of color, and a favorable eulogy for Louis Charles Roudanez a Creole of color who founded the nation's first daily Black newspaper, which was also bilingual.

Canonge was born in New Orleans to Judge Jean François Canonge and a Creole woman named Amelie Mercier who passed as white. From a young age, he traveled to Paris, where he studied at the Lycée Louis-le-Grand, the same institution his cousin Alfred Mercier attended around the same period. At the age of seventeen, he produced his first play, Le Maudit Passport, ou Les Infortunes d'une Drogue and continued to write and produce nine plays in New Orleans between 1840 and 1852. During that period, he was also listed as a Whig in the Louisiana House of Representatives. Throughout his life, he participated in local politics and held various positions such as court clerk and Louisiana Legislator, but he also directed theatrical troops. He taught French at the University of Louisiana and was a prominent lawyer. He was briefly the director of the Théâtre d'Orléans right before the American Civil War and was exiled when Union forces took New Orleans. During that period, he wrote several songs. By the 1870s, he tried to direct the French Opera House but failed due to the demand for segregation. In his later life, he took a position as a legislator in 1888, a position he held for four years. The French Government Office of Public Instruction awarded Canonge Officer d'Academie and Officer de L'instruction Publique.

== Early life ==
Louis Placide Canonge was born in New Orleans on June 29, 1822, to Judge Jean François Canonge and a Creole woman named Amelie Mercier. His father, Jean, was a prominent judge born in Jérémie, Haiti. The family fled the island during the Haitian Revolution. His mother, Amelie, was the daughter of Jean Mercier and a beautiful Creole woman named Maria Garcia de Fontenelle, who passed as white. Amelie was a young widow, and her cousin was Désirée Clary, the queen consort of Sweden. Jean was Amelie's second husband, and she also passed as white. Canonge attended the Lycée Louis-le-Grand in Paris before returning to New Orleans in 1838, at the age of 16. His first half-cousin Alfred Mercier also attended the institution around the same period. From a young age, he was a clerk of the criminal court under his father. Canonge was also listed as a Creole of color. He began writing for the L’Abeille de la Nouvelle-Orléans also known as The New Orleans Bee in 1839. He completed two short stories entitled Les Fantômes and Christophe; moreover, that same year, he also wrote the play Le Maudit Passport, ou Les Infortunes d'une Drogue, a vaudeville in one act. On May 17, 1840, he presented Gaston de St. Elme a drama in five acts for the benefit of orphans at the Théâtre d'Orléans. Canonge married Heloise Louisa Halphen on August 16, 1840, in Wilkinson, Mississippi.

Canonge continued writing for different publications throughout the 1840s, and by 1845 he completed the libretto for Le Lepreux, a dramatic scene by Gregorio Curto, who completed the music for the piece. Canonge's works began to evolve following Romanticism in France and by 1846 he completed Le Comte de Monte Christ, a staging of the famous novel by Alexandre Dumas and a short story entitled Rires et Pleurs. In 1848, he produced 'L' Ambassadeur d'Autriche and most of his works were five-act plays. Canonge directed his actors and sometimes appeared in the plays himself. He wrote Institutions Americaines in 1848 which was about the French Second Republic while he was in Paris, and he was elected to the Louisiana House of Representatives in 1849 at 26 years old as a Whig, a position he held for two years. The play Don Juan, ou Une Histore Charles Quint was produced in 1849 and critics loved it comparing Canonge to French Romantic writer Victor Hugo and the playwrights Pierre Corneille and Jean Racine. That same year, he produced a comedy in one act entitled Qui Perd Gagne which the artist dedicated to Alfred de Musset and the short story La Première et la Dernière Nuit de Nourrit. One year later, he produced a play called France d Espagne about the unsuccessful Creole Revolt of 1768 in New Orleans, instigated by Nicolas Chauvin de La Frénière to prevent the transfer of French-held Louisiana Territory to Spain. Un Grand d'Espagne appeared in 1852 and Comte de Carmagnola Tragédie a tragedy in five acts in 1856. The play Comte de Carmagnola Tragédie was so successful that it appeared in Paris for over 100 evenings, and theater critics wrote that Canonge was influenced by Alessandro Manzoni. During the late 1850s, he was involved in a well-known duel.

== Creole Duel of March 11, 1859 ==
New Orleans Creole Émile Hiriart, a well-known drama critic for the True Delta, published an article in which he stated that certain gentlemen of New Orleans spent more time with the artists of the Opera than with members of their families. Hiriart was challenged to a duel by Canonge which he fought with pistols at ten yards, where three bullets were exchanged and went through Canonge's clothes, but he was not wounded. Both men survived the duel and were satisfied, but days later, a Creole cotton dealer named Edward Locquet, a close friend of Canonge, fought a duel with Hiriart on March 11, 1859, at 4 pm. Regrettably, the duel was with shotguns loaded with balls at forty paces in Jefferson City close to the Carrollton Railroad. Locquet was shot on the left side, which pierced his heart. The man died almost instantly. The duel led to a bitter feud between the Creole men Canonge and Hiriart. Hiriart died in 1865, six years after the duel.

== American Civil War ==
Canonge was briefly the director of the Théâtre d'Orléans which was owned by Charles Parlange in 1860, but it went bankrupt right before the onset of the American Civil War. Canonge wrote the French Lyrics for the song named La Louisianaise, a Confederate hymn to the tune of the Marseillaise published by New Orleans composer Eugene Chassaignac. In early 1862, he was a Captain in the American Civil War, but when Union forces occupied New Orleans in March 1862, Union General Nathaniel Banks banished Canonge beyond the lines as a result of his refusal to swear allegiance to the Federal government. Records indicate he was living in Mandeville. Eugene Chassaignac and Canonge collaborated once again in 1864 on a song entitled Bride du Sud. That same year, Canonge wrote the French Lyrics to Risquer la Demande while the music was by Theodore von La Hache.

New Orleans composer Francois-Michel-Samuel Snaer was a free Creole of color of Haitian descent. Canonge and Snaer collaborated in 1866 on a song called Sous sa Fenetre which Canonge wrote the French Lyrics. Canonge translated Nojoque A Serious Question For A Continent into a French version entitled Nojoque Une Grave Question Pour Un Continent. The book violently uses the word negro and subjugates their community, it was written by Hinton Rowan Helper. Helper also discusses Indian, mulatto, bicolored hybrids, and Chinese as inferior races. He views all other races as inferior to the white race and also never mentions the word Creole. Canonge used the book to voice his discontent with the political situation in the South and the status of the negro. The New Orleans Times reported on June 3, 1869, that Canonge, editor of the Epogue, received a challenge to a duel by Paul Alhaisa, one of the managers of an opera house. The two fought with swords, and Canonge received a minor wound. The report said Canonge was going to duel the other opera house manager in several days.

== French Opera House 1872-1875 ==
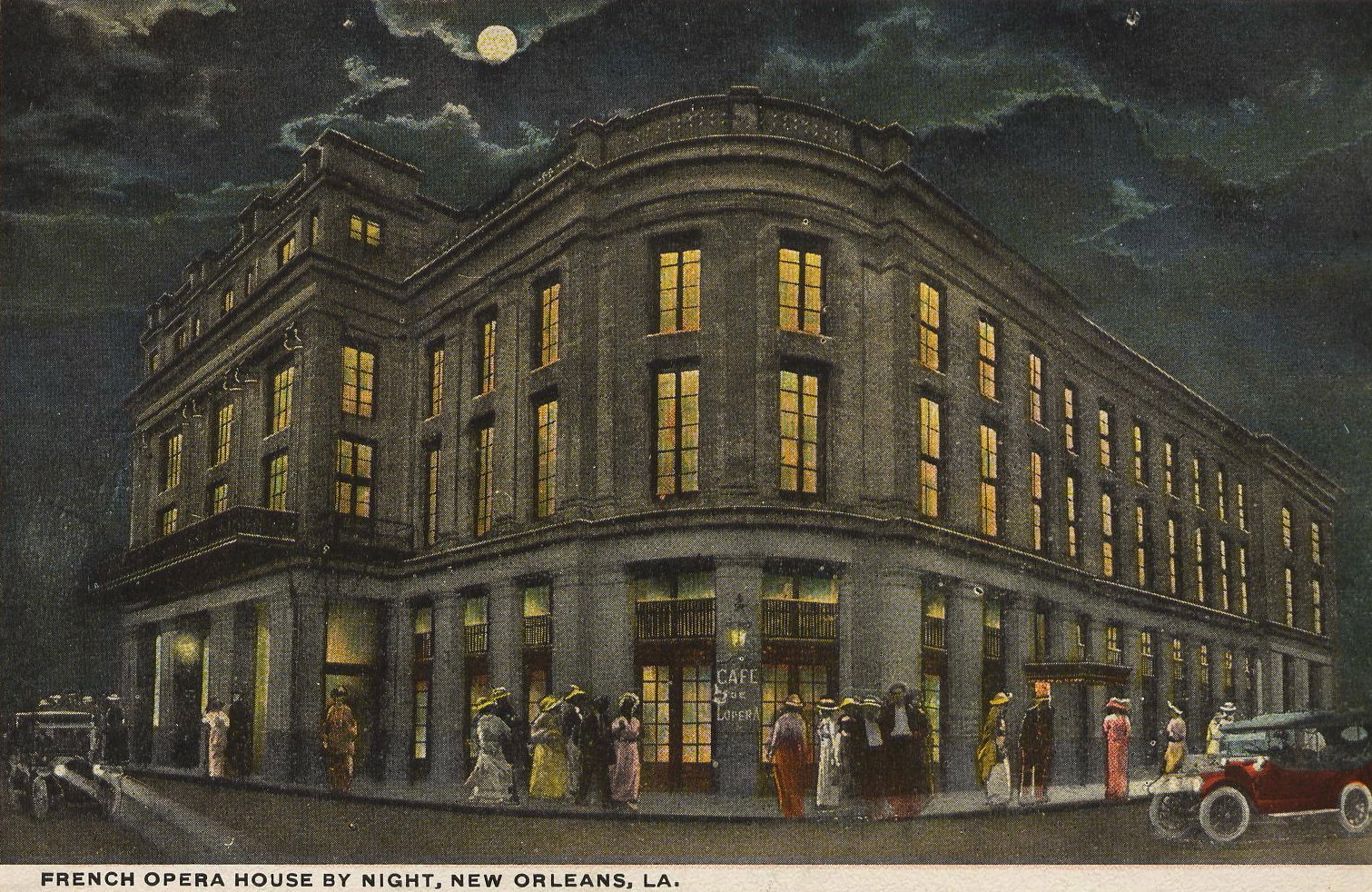
Postcard view from late in the building's history

Canonge purchased the New Orleans French Opera House and was in charge from the 1872-1873 and 1873–1874 seasons. The Opera House featured many operas some including La fille de Madame Angot, Faust (opera), L'Africaine Opera, and Il trovatore by Giuseppe Verdi. They also featured a performance by Anton Rubinstein, but due to the Reconstructionist climate, the 1873–1874 season became heavily segregated which alienated the French Creole community, who were the Opera's biggest supporters. The Opera House was no longer supported by affluent people of color, and Canonge's community no longer supported him due to the White League's strict enforcement. They started to go to Economy Hall to watch the performances instead of the Opera House. Times were so hard that Canonge even had to return silver to customers of color which were bribes to enter the Opera House. By 1875, the Opera was no longer in operation because the bank foreclosed on it and the final show was the opera Le Voyage En Chine under Canonge. Regrettably, due to the racist climate, Canonge was also sued for damages because he violated a black man's civil rights by not allowing full access to the French Opera House as it did the previous season. There were several dedications to Canonge at the Opera House in the following years and it remained closed during the 1875-1876 and 1876–1877 seasons but Troupe Pappenheim appeared in November 1877.

== Later life ==
Richard Clague discovered a painting of Venus Anadyomène in an obscure sailor's boarding house in New Orleans under a painting of Garibaldi in the bar. In 1877, Eugene Chassaignac, along with his son-in-law prominent member of the Creole Dimitry Family Randolph Natili, purchased the painting. Recall that Canonge wrote the lyrics to several songs written by Eugene. Eugene was known for desegregating Scottish Rite Freemasonic lodges in New Orleans in 1867, for which he won a gold medal. Italian revolutionary Giuseppe Garibaldi personally sent Eugene a letter of praise for his courageous act of kindness towards people of color. Canonge and John Bull Smith Dimitry wrote a forty-five-page book describing the painting entitled The Venus Anadyomène A Resurrected Gem of Mediaeval Art. Natili, Eugene, and Canonge traveled to New York together to exhibit the painting. Max Strakosch Italian Opera Company visited New Orleans in 1879, and Canonge was the agent. His wife died in 1885 at 69 years old. The French Government Office of Public Instruction awarded Canonge Officer d'Académie and Officer de l'Instruction Publique. His cousin Alfred Mercier was also bestowed a similar award. Canonge was elected to the Louisiana House of Representatives for the second time in 1888 at 65 years old and held the term for four years. In 1890, he wrote a eulogy for Louis Charles Roudanez. Canonge died in 1893 at 70 years old. He wrote nine plays and dozens of articles and short stories.

== Louis Charles Roudanez ==
Roudanez was a Creole of color from Haiti. Canonge's father Jean François Canonge was also from Jérémie, Haiti. Roudanez was a doctor and cofounded L'Union (1862-1864), one of the first Black newspapers in the US South and the first bilingual (French-English) newspaper run by African Americans in the United States. Canonge wrote Roudanez's Eulogy in Abeille de la Nouvelle-Orléans Jeudi Mars 13, 1890. Canonge spoke very highly of the Creole journalist and doctor. According to Canonge, Roudanez passed on a spotless name and one held in the highest stature to his children. Roudanez was an overachiever, insisting that he obtained the highest honors on his exams and diplomas. Although Roudanez and Canonge shared opposing political positions, both individuals disagreed with Carpetbaggers destroying Louisiana. According to Dessens, Canonge highlighted Roudanez's interest in science, the arts, and literature.

== Analysis ==
Canonge wrote countless articles and short stories and can be likened to Charles Patton Dimitry and Alfred Mercier. Creoles are controversial figures due to their desire to pass as white and blend into the ongoing stressful racial climate of post-Civil War Louisiana. Jim Crow made it more difficult for Creoles of Color, forcing people who previously passed as white to participate in more humiliating and debasing activities. In the case of the Dimitry Family, two court cases Forstall, f.p.c. v. Dimitry (1833) and Pandelly v. Wiltz (1854) reflect their problems and the necessity to pass as white as a legal solution. Three similar cases were Cauchoix v. Dupuy (1831), Bollumet v. Phillips (1842), and Dobard et al. v. Nunez (1851), dealing with race. The Pandelly Affair delineates the hard times facing the Creole community in the 1850s. Canonge's post-Civil War period reflects his difficulties dealing with the new sociological climate of New Orleans artistically and politically.

== Literary works ==
Plays authored by Louis Placide Canonge
Date	Title in French	Title in English
1839	Maudit Passeport! Ou, Les Infortunes D'Une Drogue : Vaudeville En UN Acte	Cursed Passport! Or, The Misfortunes of a Drug: A Vaudeville in One Act
1840	Gaston de St. Elme	Gaston de St. Elme
1846	Comte de Monte Christ	Count of Monte Christ
1848	L' Ambassadeur d'Autriche	The Austrian Ambassador
1849	Qui Perd Gagne Comédie	Who Loses Wins Comedy
1849	Don Juan, ou Une Histore Charles Quint	Don Juan, or A History of Charles V
1851	France d Espagne	France from Spain
1852	Un Grand d'Espagne	A Grandee of Spain
1856	Comte de Carmagnola Tragédie en Cinq Actes	Count of Carmagnola Tragedy in Five Acts (premiered in 1852 published in 1856)

Short Stores and Articles authored by Louis Placide Canonge
Date	Title in French	Title in English
1839	Les Fantômes (L’Abeille de la Nouvelle-Orléans Février)	The Ghosts
1839	Christophe (L’Abeille de la Nouvelle-Orléans Octobre)	Christopher
1846	Rires et Pleurs (Revue Louisianaise August 23, 1846)	Laughter and Tears
1848	Institutions Americaines	American Institutions
1849	La Première et la Dernière Nuit de Nourrit (Violette Mars 1849)	The First and Last Night of Nourrit
1867	Nojoque Une Grave Question Pour Un Continent. (Translation)	Nojoque A Serious Question For A Continent.
1877	La Vénus Anadyomène Un Joyau Ressuscité de l'art Médiéval	The Venus Anadyomène A Resurrected Gem of Mediaeval Art pamphlet about a painting owned by Eugene Chassaignac and Randolph Natili

Lyrics authored by Louis Placide Canonge
Date	Title in French	Title in English
1845	Le Lepreux	The Leper dramatic scene by Gregorio Curto
1851	Ma Paquita Song	Ma Paquita Song
1861	La Louisianaise	The Lousinesse (Confederate song to the tune of the Marseillaise) published by Eugene Chassaignac
1864	Bride du Sud	Southern Bride music by Eugene Chassaignac
1864	Risquer la Demande	Popping the Question music by Theodore von La Hache
1866	Sous sa fenetre	Come to me, love music by Francois-Michel-Samuel Snaer
1877	Le Réveil de la Louisiane	The Awakening of Louisiana music by Gregorio Curto

== See also ==
- Victor-Eugene McCarty

== Bibliography ==
- Tinker, Edward Larocque (1975). Les Écrits de Langue Française en Louisiane au XIXe Siècle Essais Biographiques et Bibliographiques [French-language Writings in Louisiana in the 19th Century Biographical and Bibliographical Essays]. Geneve, Switzerland: Slatkine Reprints.
- Caulfeild, Ruby Van Allen (1929). The French Literature of Louisiana. New York, NY: Institute of French Studies Columbia University Press.
- Kent, Charles William; Alderman, Edwin Anderson; Harris, Joel Chandler, eds. (1909). "Louis Placide Canonge". Library of Southern Literature Alcée Fortier. Boyle-Clarke. Vol. 2. Atlanta, Georgia: The Martin and Hoyt Company.
- Davidson, James Wood (1869). The Living Writers of the South L Placide Canonge. New York, NY: Carleton Publisher Madison Square.
- King, Grace Elizabeth (1921). Creole Families of New Orleans. New York, NY: Macmillan.
- Arthur, Stanley Clisby; Huchet de Kernion, George Campbell (2009). Old Families of Louisiana. Baton Rouge, LA: Clearfield Publishing. ISBN 9780806346885.
- Kein, Sybil (2000). Creole The History and Legacy of Louisiana's Free People of Color. Baton Rouge, LA: LSU Press. ISBN 9780807142431.
- Fertel, Rien (2014). Imagining the Creole City The Rise of Literary Culture in Nineteenth-Century New Orleans. Baton Rouge, LA: LSU Press. ISBN 9780807158241.
- Hunt, Alfred N. (2006). Haiti's Influence on Antebellum America Slumbering Volcano in the Caribbean. Baton Rouge, LA: LSU Press. ISBN 9780807153734.
- Reinders, Robert C. (1989). End of An Era New Orleans, 1850- 1860. Gretna, LA: Arcadia Publishing. ISBN 9781455603848.
- Watson, Charles S. (2014). The History of Southern Drama. Lexington, KY: University Press of Kentucky. ISBN 9780813149998.
- Brosman, Catharine Savage (2013). Louisiana Creole Literature A Historical Study. Jackson, Mississippi: University Press of Mississippi. ISBN 9781628469530.
- Trezevant, Peter J. (1888). Official Journal of the Proceedings of the House of Representatives of the State of Louisiana. Baton Rouge, LA: Leon Jastremski State Printer.
- Baroncelli, J.G. de (1906). Le Théâtre-Français, à la Nlle Orleans Essai Historique [The French Theater in New Orleans Historical Essay]. New Orleans, LA: Geo. Muller Printing House.
- Chamberlain, Ryan (2009). Pistols, Politics and the Press Dueling in 19th Century American Journalism. Jefferson, North Carolina: McFarland and Company, Inc. Publishers. ISBN 9780786452538.
- Sullivan, Lester (1988). "Composers of Color of Nineteenth-Century New Orleans: The History behind the Music" (PDF). Black Music Research Journal. 8 (1). Chicago, Illinois: Center for Black Music Research - Columbia College Chicago and University of Illinois Press: 51–82. doi:10.2307/779503. JSTOR 779503.
- Desdunes, Rodolphe Lucien (2001). Our People and Our History Fifty Creole Portraits. Baton Rouge, LA: LSU Press. ISBN 9780807127407.
- Hallman, Diana R.; Leal, César A., eds. (2022). America in the French Imaginary, 1789 -1914 Music, Revolution and Race. Martlesham, UK: Boydell Press. ISBN 9781783277001.
- Dessens, Nathalie (September 2015). "Louis Charles Roudanez, A Creole of Color of Saint-Domingue Descent: Atlantic Reinterpretations of Nineteenth-century New Orleans" (PDF). Afro-Louisiana History and Genealogy. Archived (PDF) from the original on June 23, 2024.
- Hirsch, Arnold R.; Logsdon, Joseph, eds. (1992). Creole New Orleans Race and Americanization. Baton Rouge, LA: LSU Press. ISBN 9780807117743.
- Canonge, Louis Placide (1877). The Venus Anadyomene A Resurrected Gem of Mediaeval Art. New Orleans, LA: Chassaignac & Natili.
- Thompson, Shirley Elizabeth (2009). Exiles at Home The Struggle to Become American in Creole New Orleans. Cambridge, MA: Harvard University Press. ISBN 9780674023512.
