= Jean François Canonge =

American judge (1784–1848)

Clerk of the Louisiana State Legislature
- In office 1820–1830

Judge of the Criminal Court of New Orleans
- In office 1834–1846

Personal details
- Born: 1784 Jérémie, Haiti
- Died: January 19, 1848 (aged 63–64) New Orleans, Louisiana, US
- Resting place: Saint Louis Cemetery No. 1
- Spouse: Amelie Mercier (m. 1816–1843)
- Children: Louis Placide Canonge
- Profession: Lawyer, Clerk, Judge

Jean François Canonge (1784 – January 19, 1848) was a Saint Dominican-born American lawyer, judge, slave owner, clerk, and politician. He was the judge who provided the deposition on the mistreatment of slaves by Delphine LaLaurie. Jean studied law with French American linguist and philosopher Peter Stephen Du Ponceau. He spoke French, Spanish, and Haitian Creole and functioned as an orator, linguist, and improviser for the Louisiana legislature as a clerk for over ten years. He translated Georgics into Haitian Creole and was the leader of the Supreme Council of Louisiana of Freemasonry. Records indicate Jean and his wife Amelie Mercier freed two slaves: Joseph and Marcel. His son was the dramatist Louis Placide Canonge.

Jean was born in Jérémie Saint-Domingue modern-day Haiti. Jean left the island at a very young age with his family due to the Haitian Revolution but eventually migrated to Philadelphia where he studied law. During the early 1810s, he was in francophone New Orleans and married a Creole woman of color named Amelie Mercier Amelung, who passed as white. He was a member of the Louisiana militia, director of the Louisiana State Bank, and Judge of the Criminal Court of the first judicial district of New Orleans. A dispute arose between Jean and Francois Xavier Martin, a Louisiana Supreme Court justice, which led to the order of Jean's arrest but Jean ordered the arrest of five Supreme Court justices. The issue led to the suspension of both courts until the issue was peacefully resolved.

== History ==
Jean François Canonge was born on the island of Haiti in the city of Jérémie in 1784 and because of the Haitian Revolution he left the island at a young age. His parents were Elizabeth Renée and M. De Montagé but he was raised in Mareilles by his uncle Major Canonge, Jean attempted to return to Haiti but the revolution continued and it was unsafe so he migrated to Philadelphia where he studied law with French American linguist and philosopher Peter Stephen Du Ponceau and eventually traveled to Francophone New Orleans where he lived out the remainder of this life.

He married a woman of color, a young widow named Amelie Mercier Amelung, on 17 Aug 1816 in New Orleans. She passed as white and was the daughter of wealthy planters; her parents were Jean Mercier and a Creole woman named Maria Garcia de Fontelle. Their children were Alphonse Canonge, Hippolyte Canonge, Laure Canonge, Louis Placide Canonge, Emma Canonge, and Ernest Canonge. Jean is listed as buying and selling slaves in New Orleans between 1816 and 1817. The Louisiana legislature functioned in English and French and Jean was a well-educated French English translator. Initially, he provided the legislature with newspapers and as early as 1820 he was listed as the clerk of the Louisiana Legislature a position he held until 1830. He was also involved in local political affairs and functioned as a lawyer in New Orleans. By 1834, he became Judge of the Criminal Court of the first judicial district of New Orleans from 1834 to 1846 receiving a salary of 4000 dollars.

Delphine LaLaurie was a woman who was known for torturing and murdering her slaves. The LaLaurie Mansion at 1140 Royal Street was burned by an enslaved cook while a mob gathered, Judge J. F. Canonge was responsible for the deposition on April 12, 1834. The house was sacked by an outraged mob of New Orleans citizens and LaLaurie escaped to France with her family.

== See also ==
- Louis Charles Roudanez
- Alfred Mercier

== Bibliography ==
- Hunt, Alfred N. (2006). Haiti's Influence on Antebellum America Slumbering Volcano in the Caribbean. Baton Rouge, LA: LSU Press. ISBN 9780807153734.
- Hirsch, Arnold R.; Logsdon, Joseph, eds. (1992). Creole New Orleans Race and Americanization. Baton Rouge, LA: LSU Press. ISBN 9780807117743.
- Arthur, Stanley Clisby; Huchet de Kernion, George Campbell (2009). Old Families of Louisiana. Baton Rouge, LA: Clearfield Publishing. ISBN 9780806346885.
- King, Grace Elizabeth (1921). Creole Families of New Orleans. New York, NY: Macmillan.
- Cox, Richard (September 27, 2024). "Freeing of Two Slaves by Jean and Wife". The Digital Library on American Slavery (DLAS). Archived from the original on September 27, 2024.
- Hall, Gwendolyn (September 27, 2024). "Slaves Bought and Sold by Jean François Canonge". Afro-Louisiana History and Genealogy. Archived from the original on May 15, 2024.
- Kein, Sybil (2000). Creole The History and Legacy of Louisiana's Free People of Color. Baton Rouge, LA: LSU Press. ISBN 9780807142431.
- Darkis Jr., Fred R. (Autumn 1982). "Madame Lalaurie of New Orleans". The Journal of the Louisiana Historical Association. 23 (4). Louisiana Historical Association: 383–399. JSTOR 4232213.
- Bowen, Francis (1843). The American Almanac and Repository of Useful Knowledge for the Year. Boston, MA: Published by David H. Williams.
- Roussel, Florian (1836). Laws for the Government of the District of Louisiana Passed by the Governor and Judges of the Indiana Territory. New Orleans, LA: Jerome Bayone State Printer.
- Canonge, Jean François (1819). Acts Passed at the First Session of the Fourth Legislature of the State of Louisiana. New Orleans, LA: J.C. De St. Romes State Printer.
