= Stanislas Laugier =

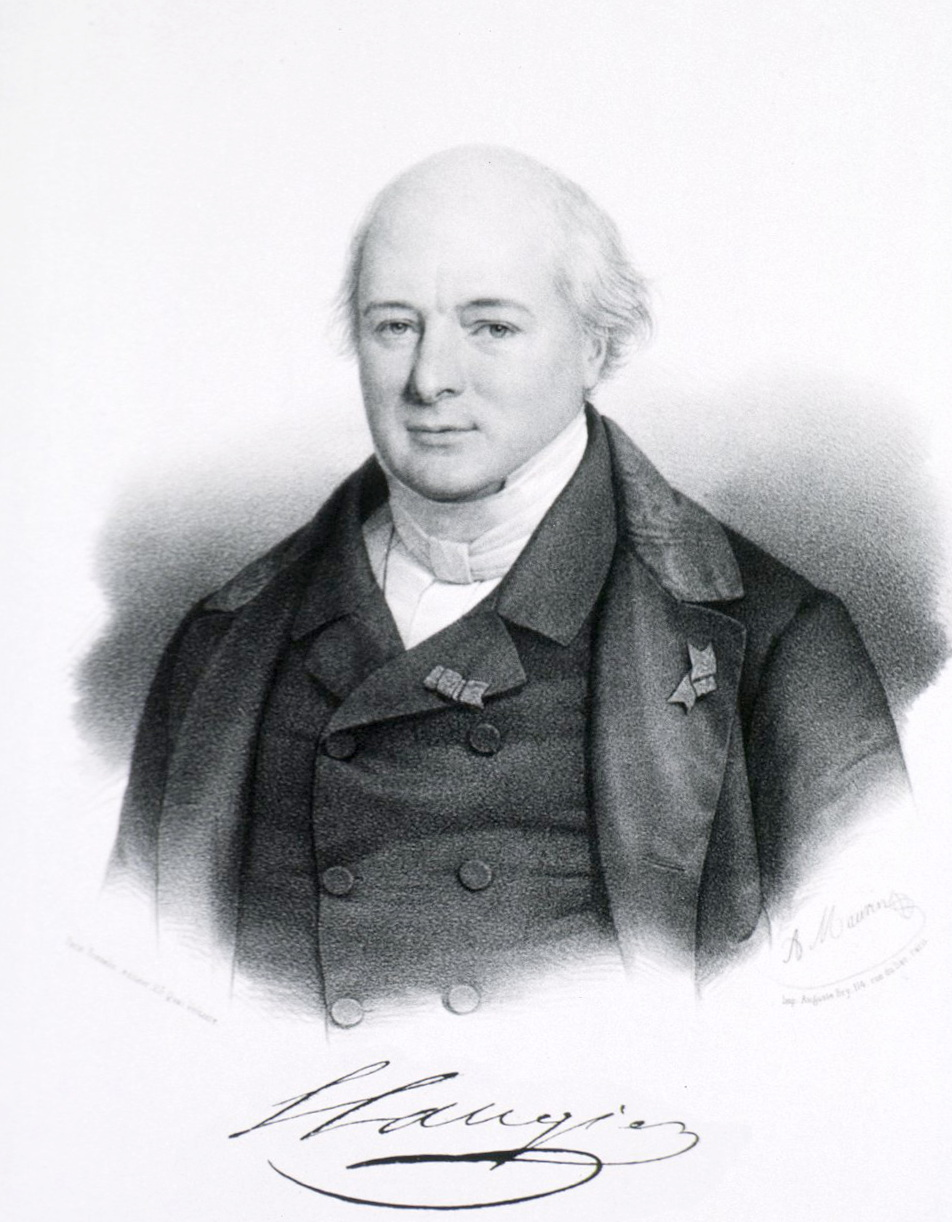
Stanislas Laugier

Stanislas Laugier (28 January 1799 – 15 February 1872) was a French surgeon and medical doctor. He was the brother of astronomer Paul Auguste Ernest Laugier (1812-1872).

He was associated with the Hôtel-Dieu in Paris, a member of the Institut and of the Académie des Sciences, president and professor of the Académie de Médecine de Paris. He was buried in the cimetière du Père-Lachaise (57ème division).

== Written works ==
With Gustave-Antoine Richelot, he published a translation of William Mackenzie's "A practical treatise on the diseases of the eye" as Traité pratique des maladies des yeux. Other noted works by Laugier include:

- Des cals difformes et des opérations qu'ils réclament, 1841 (two editions)
- Des varices, de leur traitement, 1842 - Of strictures and their treatment.
- Des lésions traumatiques de la moelle épinière, 1848 - Traumatic lesions of the spinal cord.

== Medical terms ==
- Laugier hernia: A hernia passing through an opening in the lacunar ligament.
- Laugier sign - In fracture of the lower portion of the radius, the styloid processes of the radius and of the ulna are on the same level.
- Laugiers fracture: fracture of the trochlea of humerus
