= Gustave-Antoine Richelot =

French physician

Gustave-Antoine Richelot (1806 – September 1893) was a French physician born in Nantes. He was the father of surgeon Louis-Gustave Richelot (1844-1924).

In 1831 he earned his doctorate in Paris with the dissertation, De la uterine phlébite. During his career he worked as a dispensary physician and for the Bureaux de bienfaisance. He is remembered for providing French translations of English medical works, such as:

- Oeuvres chirurgicales complètes d’Astley Cooper (1835), a translation of Astley Cooper's surgical works, written in collaboration with surgeon Charles Marie Edouard Chassaignac.
- Oeuvres complètes de John Hunter (4 volumes 1838-42), a translation of John Hunter's works from an edition by James Frederick Palmer.
- Traité pratique des maladies des yeux (1844), a translation of William Mackenzie's "A practical treatise on the diseases of the eye", with annotations by surgeon Stanislas Laugier.

Among Richelot's original works was a treatise on prostitution in England and Scotland titled De la prostitution en Angleterre et en Écosse (1857), and a work on women in the medical profession called La femme-médecin (1875). Richelot was the last surviving founding member of the journal L'Union médicale.
