= Robert François Laugier =

French pharmacologist (1722–1793)

Robert Francois Laugier
- Born: 1722; Nancy, duchy of Lorraine
- Died: 1793 (aged 70–71); Reggio
- Occupation: Pharmacologist

Robert François Laugier (1722–1793) was a French pharmacologist. He is known for his book "Institutiones pharmaceuticae sive philosophia pharmaceutica" and for his work on the alembic.
