= Paul-Auguste-Ernest Laugier =

French astronomer (1812–1872)

Paul-Auguste-Ernest Laugier (22 December 1812, in Paris – 5 April 1872) was a French astronomer, one of two French astronomers referred to as M. Laugier.

== Early life and education ==
The son of André Laugier, a chemist (1 August 1770 – 9 April 1832), studied astronomy under François Arago.

== Career ==
He then obtained a post in the observatory at Paris, made important discoveries in regard to magnetism, comets, eclipses, meteors, and sunspots, and made improvements in astronomical clocks. Laugier determined the exact latitude of the Paris observatory (1853), correcting previous errors. He published a catalogue of fifty-three nebulae, and another (1857) of the declination of 140 stars, and contributed astronomical papers to the Connaissance du Temps. He was long associated with Arago in researches on terrestrial physics, and was for some years president of the Academy of Sciences.

== Work ==
- Laugier, Paul-Auguste-Ernest, “Note sur la première comète de 1301”, Comptes rendus hebdomadaires des séances de l’Académie des sciences, 15 (1842), 949-951 Gallica
- Laugier, Paul-Auguste-Ernest, “Notice sur l’apparition de la comète de Halley en 1378”, Comptes rendus hebdomadaires des séances de l’Académie des sciences, 16 (1843), 1003-1006 Gallica.
- Laugier, Paul-Auguste-Ernest, “Mémoire sur quelque comètes anciennes”, Comptes rendus hebdomadaires des séances de l’Académie des sciences, 22 (1846), 148-156 Gallica – orbital elements of the comets of 568, 770, 1337, 1433, 1468, 1472 & 1506.
- Laugier, Paul-Auguste-Ernest, “Mémoire sur quelques anciennes apparitions de la comète de Halley, inconnues jusqu’ici”, Comptes rendus hebdomadaires des séances de l’Académie des sciences, 23 (1846), 183-189 Gallica.

== See also ==
- La Recherche de l'Absolu
