= John Gair =

Post-Civil War American politician

Member of the Louisiana Senate

Personal details
- Party: Republican
- Occupation: politician

John Gair and the Turmoil Surrounding His Death

The post-reconstruction era brought Louisiana lynching violence to full force in the early 1870s. During this era, John Gair as well as his sister became lynching targets. In 1875, John Gair was framed for a “poisoning attempt on a local planter.” He was allegedly kidnapped and shot; additionally, his sister was lynched to cover up the framing.

During the time when John Gair was a legislator for the state of Louisiana, he was seen as a primary threat in the eyes of White supremacists. Gair, a former enslaved carpenter, helped to write the Constitution of 1868. He was a very popular man among Blacks voters. His popularity led him to become the first Black candidate that Black voters voted for in the history of Louisiana. Gair became a monument for interracial politics.

Picayune, a major New Orleans newspaper, along with some prominent ex-rebels published a "fake news" article claiming that Black Americans were organizing a so-called “Black League” to commit violent acts against Whites. The violent acts involved the most common accusation against Blacks at the time: rape White women and kill White men. Many more articles were published after the initial making a variety of accusations. Many of these accusations had no basis or evidence to support the claims. They were meant to stir conflicts between the two races.

In July 1875, vigilantes ran John Gair, Robert Ray and T.M.J. Clark out of East Feliciana Parish. Like the vigilantes, another source believed that the “fake news” about the “Black League” were aimed at John Gair and other prominent Blacks in Louisiana. Their true intentions were not about common Black citizen but Gair, which they saw as a threat to Whites.

The White leaguers were afraid of their crimes coming out, so they planned a cover-up to cover their tracks. By accusing the John Gair, who has already left the parish, of poisoning a local, the local officials issued an arrest warrant. Before the arrest warrant was issued, an assassination attempt against Gair almost succeed. On the way back to the parish, Gair was allegedly kidnapped by masked vigilantes and killed. To cover-up their tracks, they also lynched Gair's sister-in-law to prevent her from testifying.

To further fabricate their "fake news," the editor of a newspaper wrote that the person who was poisoned had died. Whether the public knew the whole truth, they celebrated the death of Gair and claimed it was justified because it was in front of a jury. Subsequently, eye-witnesses claimed that the person who was poisoned was seen in the streets. With the exception of the Louisianian, every newspaper outlet claimed that the “confession” and the lynching by the White League happened before the murder of Gair.

Mary T. Reiley wrote a poem about his murder.

== See also ==
- African American officeholders from the end of the Civil War until before 1900
