= André Laugier =

French chemist (1770–1832)

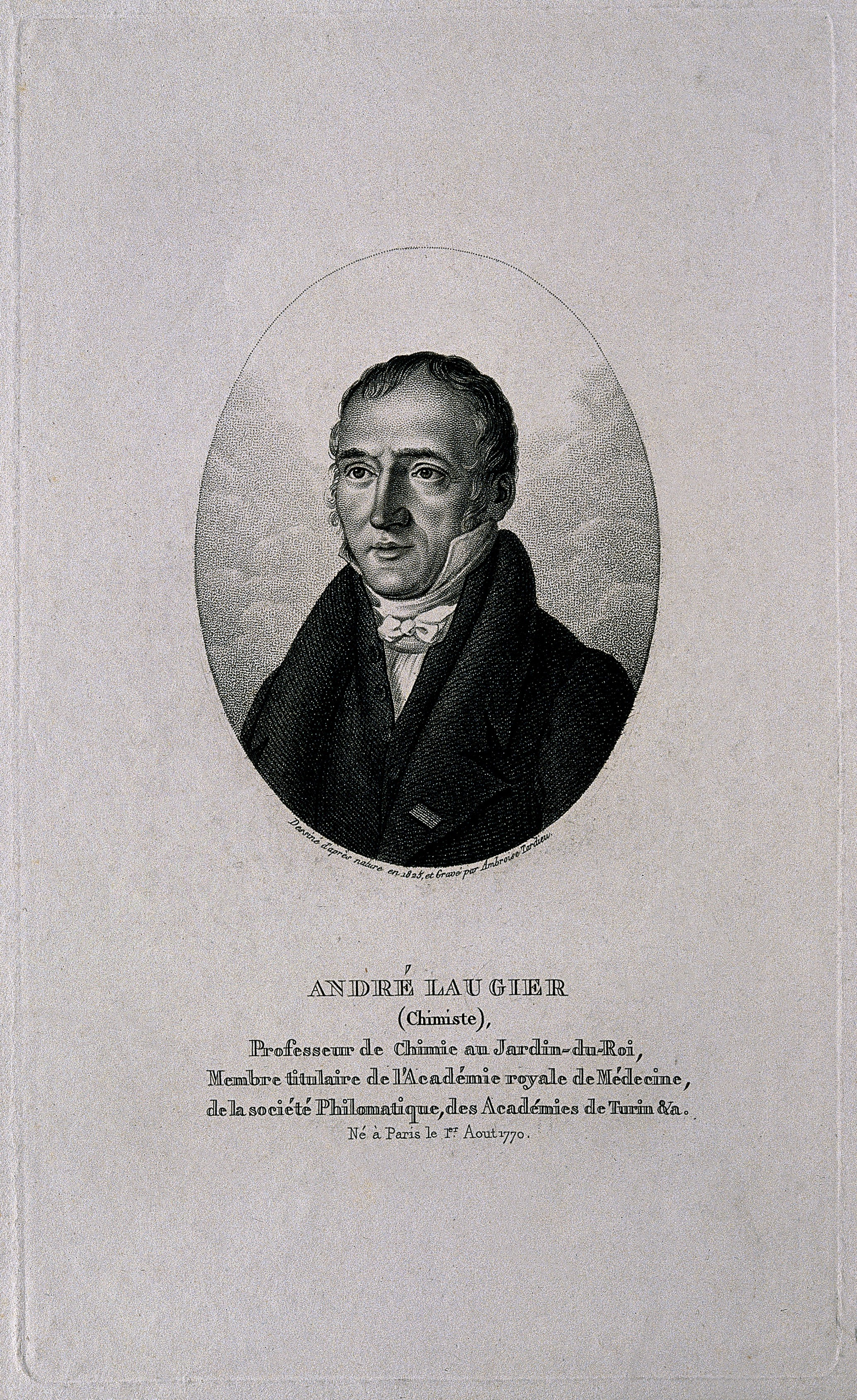
André Laugier (1770–1832)

André Laugier (1 August 1770, in Lisieux – 19 April 1832, in Paris) was a French chemist, pharmacist and mineralogist. He was a cousin to famed chemist Antoine François Fourcroy and the father of astronomer Paul Auguste Ernest Laugier (1812–1872).

He received his education in his hometown of Lisieux, and during the French Revolution, was tasked with collecting church bells in Bretagne in order for them to be melted down for the production of cannons. In 1794 he was employed as head of the gunpowder and saltpeter works at the Comite de salut public. In 1797 he received his master's degree in pharmacy, and subsequently taught classes in chemistry and pharmacy at the military training schools in Toulon and Lille.

In 1803, with assistance from Fourcroy, he became an assistant naturalist at the Muséum National d'Histoire Naturelle, where, following the death of Fourcroy in December 1809, he was appointed as his replacement as professor of chemistry. In 1829 he succeeded Louis Nicolas Vauquelin as director of the École de pharmacie in Paris. Laugier died of cholera in Paris on 19 April 1832.

He was the author of many scientific notes on minerals, meteorites and meteoric irons, and is credited with providing practical methods for separation of cobalt and nickel; iron and titanium; cerium and iron. His chemical findings were recorded mainly in the Annales du Muséum National d'Histoire Naturelle. In 1829 he published the four volume Cours de Chimie générale.
