= Édouard Chassaignac =

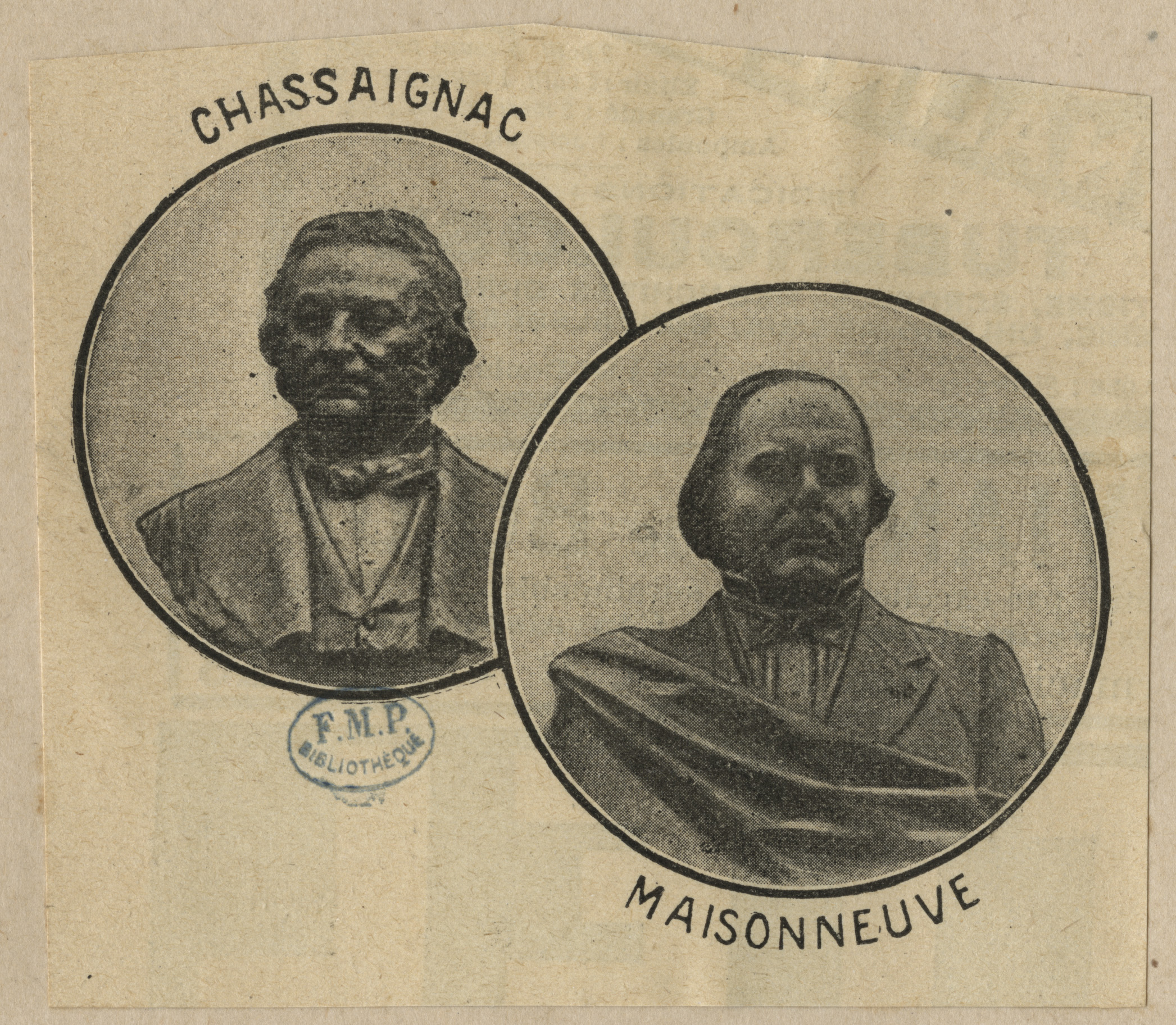
Tableau of Chassaignac and Jules Germain François Maisonneuve.

Édouard-Pierre-Marie Chassaignac (24 December 1804 – 26 August 1879) was a French medical doctor. He was born in Nantes and in 1835 became prosector and professor at the university and physician at the central bureau of the hospitals of Paris. He originated the surgical operation known as écrasement, by means of which tumors, piles, polypi, and other growths may be removed without the effusion of blood. The general introduction of drainage in surgery is also due to his initiative. He introduced the use of drainage tubes into surgery.

== Written works ==
He wrote Traité de l'écrasement linéaire (1856); Leçons sur la trachéométrie (1855); Clinique chirurgicale (1854–58); Traité pratique de la suppuration et du drainage chirurgical (two volumes, 1859). With Gustave-Antoine Richelot (1806-1893) he published a French translation of the surgical works of Astley Cooper, Oeuvres chirurgicales complètes d’Astley Cooper.

== Terms ==
Chassaignac's tubercle — the strongly developed anterior tubercle of the transverse process of the sixth cervical vertebra: called also carotid tubercle.

Dorland's Medical Dictionary (1938)
