= John Bull (Pennsylvania politician) =

American general during the American Revolution

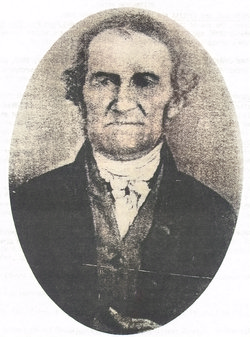

Member of the Pennsylvania House of Representatives from Northumberland, Pennsylvania
- In office December 6, 1804 – March 31, 1806

Personal details
- Born: June 1, 1731 Montgomery, Pennsylvania
- Died: August 9, 1824 (aged 93) Northumberland, Pennsylvania
- Resting place: Riverview Cemetery
- Party: Federalist Party
- Profession: Politician, military officer, statesman, slave owner

Military service
- Allegiance: Great Britain; United States
- Branch/service: Pennsylvania Militia; Continental Army
- Years of service: 1758–1760 Pennsylvania Regiment; 1775–1780 2nd Pennsylvania Regiment
- Rank: Captain (Third Battalion Pennsylvania Regiment); Colonel 2nd Pennsylvania Regiment; General 2nd Pennsylvania Regiment
- Commands: Third Battalion Pennsylvania Regiment; 2nd Pennsylvania Regiment
- Battles/wars: French and Indian War; Forbes Expedition; American Revolutionary War; Philadelphia campaign

John Bull (June 1, 1731 – August 9, 1824) was an American politician, military officer, statesman, and planter. Initially, his military career started under John Forbes during the Forbes Expedition in the 1750s. During the American Revolution, he was a delegate in the Pennsylvania Provincial Conference, declaring Pennsylvania independent from the British Colonies. Benjamin Franklin and Bull sat on many committees together. Bull was a very active participant in many different roles during the revolution. He was mainly in charge of the defenses of Fort Billingsport. He held the rank of Colonel in Pennsylvania's 2nd Regiment and eventually rose to the rank of Adjutant General of the Pennsylvania Militia by the Pennsylvania Supreme Executive Council in defense of Philadelphia during the Philadelphia campaign.

Bull was born in Montgomery County, Pennsylvania where he was raised on a farm. By 1758, he participated in the French and Indian War as a captain where he met George Washington and the two became friends. During the 1760s he was involved in local politics. In 1770, Benjamin Rittenhouse married Bull's oldest daughter Elizabeth. Bull became good friends with his brother American astronomer David Rittenhouse. During the revolution, George Washington visited Bull's Masonic Lodge while he was in Valley Forge. Bull was attending as the Worshipful Master of the lodge. After the British evacuated Philadelphia Bull continued to proved defense to the city. Bull's son-in-law Benjamin was superintendent of the gunlock factory in Pennsylvania. After the American Revolution while he was in his seventies he briefly held the position of Pennsylvania assemblyman.

== History ==
Bull was born in Providence Township, Philadelphia County now called Montgomery County, Pennsylvania. He was the son of Thomas Bull and Elizabeth Rossiter. His mother died at 92 years old and his father died in 1747. He had two brothers and a sister William, Thomas, and Elizabeth Betson. John married a Welsh woman named Mary Phillps on August 13, 1752. Bull participated in the taking of Fort Duquesne as a captain along with George Washington and other troops under the direction of General Forbes around May 12, 1758. By 1761, he became a justice of the peace in Philadelphia, and by 1768 he was justice of the Court of quarter sessions in the same county. By 1771, he was in possession of 534 acres in Norristown, PA. At the onset of the American Revolution, he actively participated and eventually reached the rank of General.

In 1774 he was a member of the Committee of Inspection in his county. The American Revolution started to impact different parts of the country and Bull became actively involved, He was a delegate to the Pennsylvania Provincial Conference of January 18, 1775, which declared the independence of Pennsylvania from the British Colonies. Bull was also a colonel of the First Pennsylvania Battalion of the Continental Troops from November 25, 1775, to January 20, 1776. He was also a member of the Pennsylvania Constitutional Convention in the summer of 1776 which had a profound impact on American public opinion and cleared the way for the issuing of the Declaration of Independence. In July, he was colonel of the Sixth Associator's Battalion of the State and a member of the Council of Safety of the State. He later became a justice of the peace.

By September 1776, he was appointed general superintendent of the construction of defenses at Fort Billingsport. Billingsport was a crucial defense. On January 20, 1777, he was a commissioner to sign a peace treaty with the Indians at Easton, Pennsylvania. By February 1777, he was in charge of the defenses at Fort Billingsport. He was also active in local Pennsylvania politics as an assemblyman and also briefly served on the Board of War. Because of the active war, Bull took many government positions. By May 1777, he was in charge of the Pennsylvania State Regiment, and on the 16th of July of that year, he was appointed adjutant general of Pennsylvania. Philadelphia was occupied by the British during the Philadelphia campaign on around August 25, 1777, Fort Billingsport also fell.

In October 1777, John's house store, and barns were burned down by British troops and his wife's life was threatened by General Howe and his soldiers. The United States government hid a sizeable portion of weapons and ammunition on John's estate everything was lost. Luckily his wife was unharmed. By December 1777, General James Irvine was captured by the British and Bull was given command of the Second Brigade of the Pennsylvania militia under General Armstrong. When the British moved South and evacuated Philadelphia on June 18, 1778, the government ordered John to continue his service at Fort Billingsport for the rest of the war. He continued constructing defenses his knowledge of Pennsylvania was crucial to the revolution in the years 1778–1779, he helped raise a defense obstacle in the Delaware River named a Cheval de frize to stop British ships. He was also responsible for making repairs to roads, bridges, and cities. By 1880, he was Commissioner of Purchases for Philadelphia County, responsible for purchasing supplies for the Continental Army.

At the close of the war, he moved to Northumberland, Pennsylvania. He sold a large amount of land he owned in Barkeyville, Pennsylvania. He was venerated in the city of Philadelphia for his service during the war. According to records, he was taxed for one slave he owned, slavery was abolished in Pennsylvania in 1780 but it was a gradual abolition and people still owned slaves until 1847. Bull was elected state assemblyman of the state of Pennsylvania Northumberland district from December 6, 1804 – March 31, 1806, while he was in his 70s. He unsuccessfully ran for Congress around the same period. Regrettably, his wife Mary Phillips Bull died at Northumberland, on February 23, 1811, at eighty years of age. He died on August 9, 1824, in Northumberland, Pennsylvania and is buried there. Brother John Bull was a Freemason and raised in Lodge No. 8 of Philadelphia where he became a Worshipful Master of the lodge. He was also admitted to Lodge No. 22 on August 9. 1786.

== Family ==
He was the father of six children. They had one son, Ezekiel William. He was a surgeon in the United States Army. They also had five daughters: Elizabeth, who married Benjamin Rittenhouse, brother of David Rittenhouse; Anna or Animus, who married General John Smith, of Virginia; Mary, married Joseph Nourse, Rebecca, married Captain John Boyd and Sarah Harriet, married three times. His great-granddaughter Mary Powell Mills married into the prominent Creole family named the Dimitry Family. His great-great-grandchildren John Bull Smith Dimitry, Charles Patton Dimitry, and Virginia Dimitry were all notable authors. Their sibling Thomas Dabney Dimitry was one of the first mixed-race Creole post office superintendents in the largest post office in New Orleans.

== Bibliography ==
- Egle, William Henry (1898). Some Pennsylvania Women During the War of the Revolution Mary Phillips Bull. Harrisburg, PA: Harrisburg Publishing Company.
- Lockwood, Mary S. (September 1895). "Sketch of General John Bull". The American Monthly Magazine. 7 (3). Washington, DC: National Society of the Daughters of the American Revolution.
- Pecquet du Bellet, Louise (1907). Some Prominent Virginia Families. Vol. 4. Lynchburg, VA: J. P. Bell Company (Incorporated).
- Bull, James Henry; McGee, Anita Newcombe (1919). Record of the Descendents of John and Elizabeth Bull, Early Settlers in Pennsylvania. San Francisco, CA: The Shannon Conmy Company.
- Godcharles, Frederic Antes (1911). Freemasonry in Northumberland & Snyder Counties, Pennsylvania. Milton, PA: The New Era Printing Company.
- Hazard, Samuel (1829). The Register of Pennsylvania Devoted to the Preservation of Facts and Documents And Every Other Kind of Useful Information Respecting the State of Pennsylvania Vol. 4. Philadelphia, PA: WM. F Geddes.
- Thomson, Chas (1852). Minutes of the Supreme Executive Council of Pennsylvania From Its Organization to the Termination of the Revolution Vol XI. Harrisburg, PA: Theo Fenn & Co.
