= Michael Dracos Dimitry =

Louisiana Creole Politician

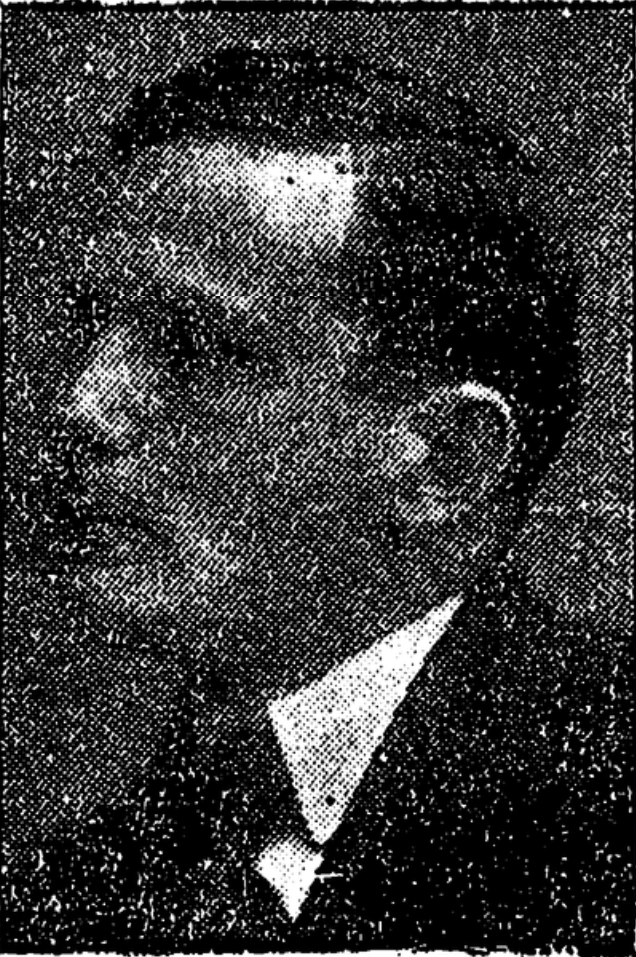

New Orleans Assistant City Attorney
- In office May 4, 1901 – May 1, 1905

New Orleans Attorney for Public Administration
- In office 1913 – Mar 19, 1918
- Succeeded by: Loys Charbonnett

Personal details
- Born: August 9, 1874 New Orleans, Louisiana, US
- Died: October 21, 1929 (aged 55) Shreveport, Louisiana
- Resting place: Metairie Cemetery
- Spouse: Genevieve Flynn (m. 1904–1929)
- Parents: Theodore John Dimitry (father); Irene Scott (mother)
- Education: Tulane University
- Profession: Politician; Lawyer
- Known for: Representing Lulu White
- Relatives: Theodore John Dimitry Jr. Alexander Dimitry; Marianne Celeste Dragon; Michel Dragon; Charles Patton Dimitry; John Bull Smith Dimitry; Ernest Lagarde; Theodore John Dimitry Jr. George Pandely
- Family: Dimitry Family (Creoles)

Michael Dracos Dimitry (August 9, 1874 - October 21, 1929) was a Creole politician and lawyer known for legally representing New Orleans Storyville brothel madam Lulu White in her 1905 tax evasion incident along with George W Flynn. He also represented Lulu along with many colored prostitutes when they were ordered to vacate Storyville on February 18, 1917. Regrettably, Storyville was shut down eight months later. Michael's uncle was Mayor of Corencro Dracos Anthony Dimitry, and his brother was prominent New Orleans Optometrist Theodore John Dimitry Jr.. His family is one of the oldest Creole families in New Orleans, known as the Dimitry Family. His great-grandmother was mixed-race Creole socialite Marianne Celeste Dragon, and they experienced racism throughout the 19th century. At the turn of the century, they were one of the most powerful Creole families in Louisiana. Michael unsuccessfully ran for Judge of the New Orleans Court of Appeals in 1908 and 1912.

Michael was born in New Orleans in 1874 to Theodore John Dimitry and Irene Scott. His grandfather was prominent Creole educator John Baptiste Michael Dracos Dimitry. Both Michael and his brother Theodore attended Tulane University, one studied law and the other medicine. By 1901, Michael became New Orleans' assistant city attorney, and in 1904, he married Genevieve Flynn, the daughter of Louisiana State Senator George W Flynn. Both Michael and George practiced law together. Michael remained New Orleans' assistant city attorney until 1905, and during the following years, he unsuccessfully ran for New Orleans Judge until 1913, when he was nominated for New Orleans Attorney for Public Administration, a position he held for five years until 1918. He eventually moved to Shreveport, Louisiana, where he lived out the remainder of his life practicing law. Regrettably, he died of heart disease and pneumonia at the age of 55, and he is buried at the Metairie Cemetery in New Orleans.

== Biography ==
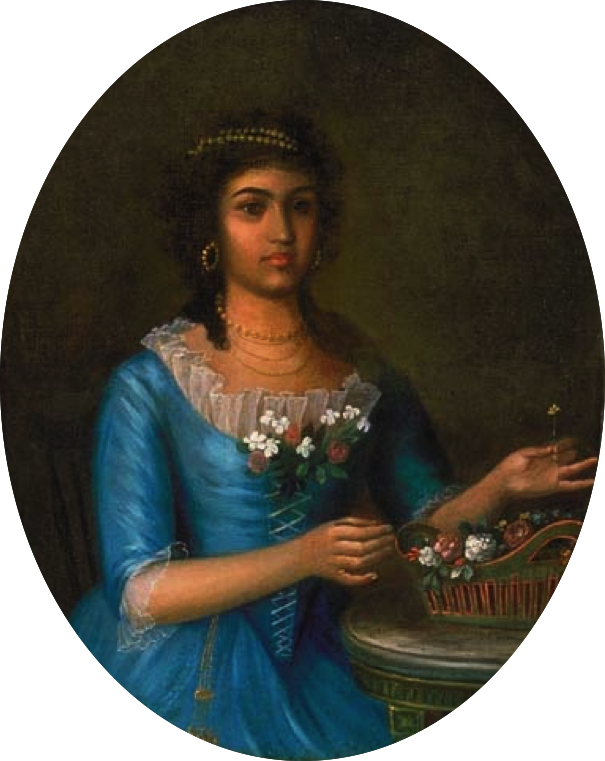
Michael's great-grandmother Marianne Céleste Dragon

Michael Dracos Dimitry was born in New Orleans to Theodore John Dimitry Sr. and Irene Scott. His great-grandmother was Marianne Celeste Dragon, a mixed Creole of partial Greek ancestry who married a native Greek named Andrea Dimitry, who was from the island of Hydra. Together they founded the Dimitry Family a mixed-race Creole family that endured countless racial hardships during the 1800s. Michael was named after his great-great-grandfather American Revolutionary War hero Michel Dracos. Michael's father, Theodore, attended Georgetown along with other prominent Creole family members. His father's first cousins included George Pandely, Thomas Dabney Dimitry, and Charles Patton Dimitry. Michael and his brother Theodore attended Tulane University around the same period. Michael studied law while Theodore studied medicine. Michael was listed as a delegate to the state nomination convention in 1900, and one year later, he was working as the New Orleans assistant city attorney. In the ensuing years, he represented a cousin named Alexander J. Dimitry, who was being charged with stealing mail while using cocaine, morphine, and alcohol. Due to the powerful family connections, his cousin was found not guilty.

George W Flynn was a prominent lawyer, politician, and Louisiana State Senator. Michael married his daughter Genevieve in New Orleans on June 29, 1904. The next year, both Michael and George represented Lulu White was a well-known New Orleans Storyville brothel madam who was being evaded for taxes. Michael unsuccessfully ran for Judge of the New Orleans Court of Appeals several times between 1908 and 1912.

Peter J. Flanagan selected Michael as a lawyer for the New Orleans Public Administrator in 1913. Lulu White aka Lulu Hendley and the luxurious resort district of Storyville were under attack due to racial segregation. Lulu White's brothel, Mahogany Hall, featured women of color, but it was segregated, and only white men could fraternize with the mixed-race women. New Orleans wanted to move the colored or black prostitutes and madams of Storyville to the uptown red-light district, which was considered a less wealthy area filled with crime. Lulu was ordered to vacate her premises at 235 North Basin Street and to leave Storyville. Michael represented Lulu along with many colored prostitutes when they were ordered to vacate Storyville on February 18, 1917. Regrettably, Storyville was shut down eight months later at midnight on Nov. 12, 1917.

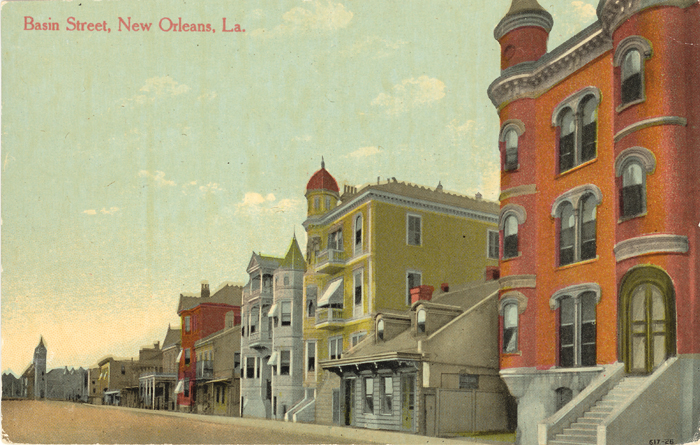
Lulu's Mahogany Hall in the Storyville District

The closure uprooted two thousand women and led to the mass exodus of jazz musicians from the region, but Lulu continued to operate Mahogany Hall. Michael was replaced as lawyer for the New Orleans Public Administrator in 1918 by Loys Charbonnett. One year after Storyville was shut down, Lulu was arrested on federal charges but had a clean criminal record. She was sentenced to one year in federal prison, but the judge told her to sell her brothel and he would show leniency, possibly one or two months in prison. Regrettably, she did not uphold the agreement in time, and by March 1919, two federal Marshals escorted her to an Oklahoma penitentiary.

Lulu was a heavy drinker and had many physical ailments which helped reduce her sentence, and she also pleaded with her lawyer, Michael, to help her. Michael personally wrote the U.S. Attorney General A. Mitchell Palmer in April 1919, pleading her case, and received no answer. Lulu personally wrote a letter on June 6, 1919, pleading with Palmer, including appeals from her doctor, her lawyer, Michael, and the original sentencing judge, Rufus Foster, who felt she served her time. U.S. Attorney General Palmer was sympathetic to her story and helped her apply to President Woodrow Wilson for executive clemency, which she received by cable from Paris on June 16, 1919, and she was released from prison. Twelve days after Wilson signed the Treaty of Versailles.

After his public service, Michael continued to practice law until the time of his death. He worked in New Orleans and also migrated to Shreveport, Louisiana, where he was listed as an attorney. Some notable cases he was involved in include Garland v. Dimitry. Regrettably, he died of heart disease and pneumonia at the age of 55, and he is buried at the Metairie Cemetery in New Orleans.

== Bibliography ==
- Pecquet du Bellet, Louise (1907a). Some Prominent Virginia Families. Vol. 4. Lynchburg, VA: J. P. Bell Company (Incorporated).
- Allured, Janet; Gentry, Judith F.; Farmer-Kaiser, Mary; Frystak, Shannon Lee (2009). Louisiana Women Their Lives and Times. Athens,GA: University of Georgia Press. ISBN 9780820342696.
- Landau, Emily Epstein (2013). Spectacular Wickedness Sex, Race, and Memory in Storyville, New Orleans. Baton Rouge, Louisiana: LSU Press. ISBN 9780807150146.
- Michel, John T. (1908). Report of the Secretary of State of to his Excellence the Governor of Louisiana. Baton Rouge, Louisiana: The Daily State Publishing Company State Printers.
- Campbell, T.W. (1903). Manual of the City of New Orleans, Comprising City Charter of 1896 as Amended in 1898, 1900 and 1902, relative to City affairs. Baton Rouge, Louisiana: T.W. Campbell Clerk of Council.
- Rogers, William O. (1889). Tulane University of Louisiana Catalogue 1888-1889 High School College University Law and Medical Departments and Sophia Newcomb Memorial College for Women. New Orleans, Louisiana: Tulane University Press.
- Stumpf, Anthony (June 1897). "At the Tulane Law Department Graduation". The American Lawyer. 5 (6). New York, NY: Stumpf and Stuerer: 286.
- Christophe, Landry (August 18, 2018). "Mixed Marriages In Louisiana Creole Families 164 marriages" (PDF). Louisiana Historic & Cultural Vistas. Archived (PDF) from the original on February 9, 2023.
- Miller, Mike (January 30, 2025). "Flynn, George W." Orleans Parish, LAGenWeb. Archived from the original on January 30, 2025.
