= Dracos Anthony Dimitry =

Louisiana Creole Politician

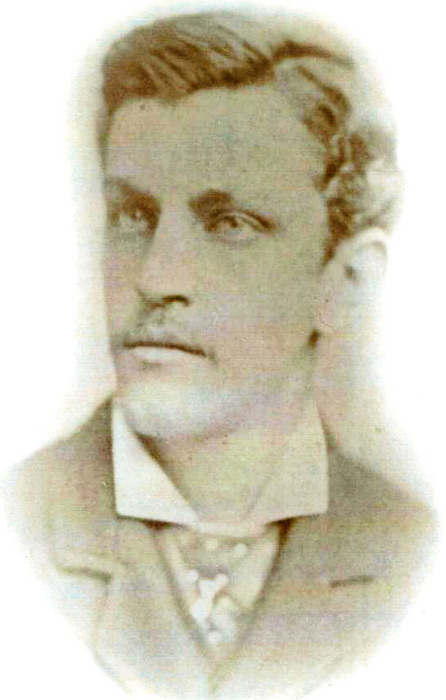

Carencro Councilman
- In office May 4, 1891 – May 1, 1893
- Preceded by: G. H. Guilbeau
- Succeeded by: Dr. F. W. Courtney

Mayor of Carencro
- In office May 1, 1893 – May 1, 1899
- Preceded by: Dr. F. W. Courtney
- Succeeded by: Hon, E. L. Estilette

Personal details
- Born: September 17, 1858 New Orleans, Louisiana, US
- Died: October 24, 1918 (aged 60) New Iberia, Louisiana
- Resting place: Saint Peter's Cemetery
- Spouse: Lizzie D. Ruth (m. 1882–1918)
- Parents: John Baptiste Michael Dracos Dimitry (father); Sophia Powers (mother)
- Profession: Politician; Railroad Station Agent
- Relatives: Alexander Dimitry; Marianne Celeste Dragon; Michel Dragon; Charles Patton Dimitry; John Bull Smith Dimitry; Ernest Lagarde; Theodore John Dimitry Jr. George Pandely; Elizabeth Virginia Dimitry Ruth
- Family: Dimitry Family (Creoles)

Dracos Anthony Dimitry (September 17, 1858 - October 24, 1918) was a mixed race Louisiana Creole councilman, mayor, solicitor, and railroad station agent. His grandmother was Marianne Celeste Dragon and his first cousin was George Pandely. He was a member of the prominent New Orleans mixed Greek Creole family known as the Dimitry Family. The family underwent countless hardships of racism throughout the 19th century two major incidents involving the family were documented in court entitled Forstall, f.p.c. v. Dimitry (1833) and Pandelly v. Wiltz (1854). The Creole family was heavily pressured to pass as white because during the Jim Crow era laws became more severe including segregation and eventually the one-drop rule was adopted in Louisiana by 1910.

Dracos was born in New Orleans to Creole educator Jean Baptiste Michael Dracos Dimitry and Sophia Powers. Jean Baptiste was the fifth child of Marianne Celeste Dragon and Andrea Dimitry. Both Dracos' parents and grandparents were involved in interracial marriages. Dracos' uncle was Creole author and diplomate Alexander Dimitry and the family was extremely educated six members attended Georgetown between 1820 and 1870 including Dracos' father and older brother Theodore John Dimitry. Dracos was the mayor of Carencro from 1893 to 1899 and the railroad station agent of Carencro, Jeanerette, and New Iberia.

Dracos participated in countless organizations in his local town most of the fraternal organizations were for whites only some included: New Iberia Lodge No. 554, Benevolent and Protective Order of Elks, Knights of Pythias Lodge No. 39, and the Knights of Honor Lodge No. 3155. Dracos won several awards for maintaining his railroad station to the highest standard. He died in New Iberia, Louisiana at 60 years of age and his wife, Lizzie lived another twenty years.

== Early life ==
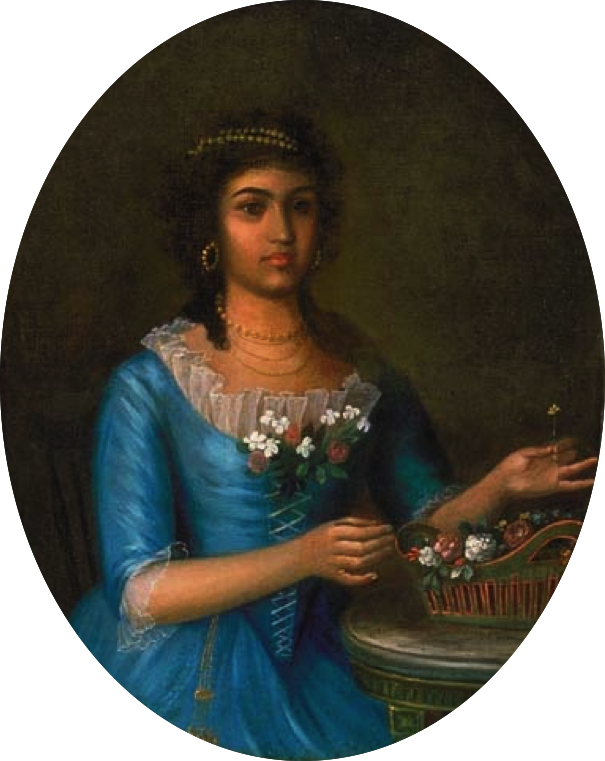
Dracos' grandmother Marianne Céleste Dragon

Dracos was born in New Orleans to Creole educator Jean Baptiste Michael Dracos Dimitry and Sophia Powers. He was their fifth child and his mother Sophia was around 41 years old when he was born. His parents were involved in an interracial marriage and Dracos' grandmother was Marianne Celeste Dragon. His father was called Michael Dracos Dimitry and finished Georgetown University in 1856. Both his parents had a successful women's school entitled the Orleans Female Academy (1842-1871) and his uncle Alexander Dimitry was the first superintendent of education in Louisiana.

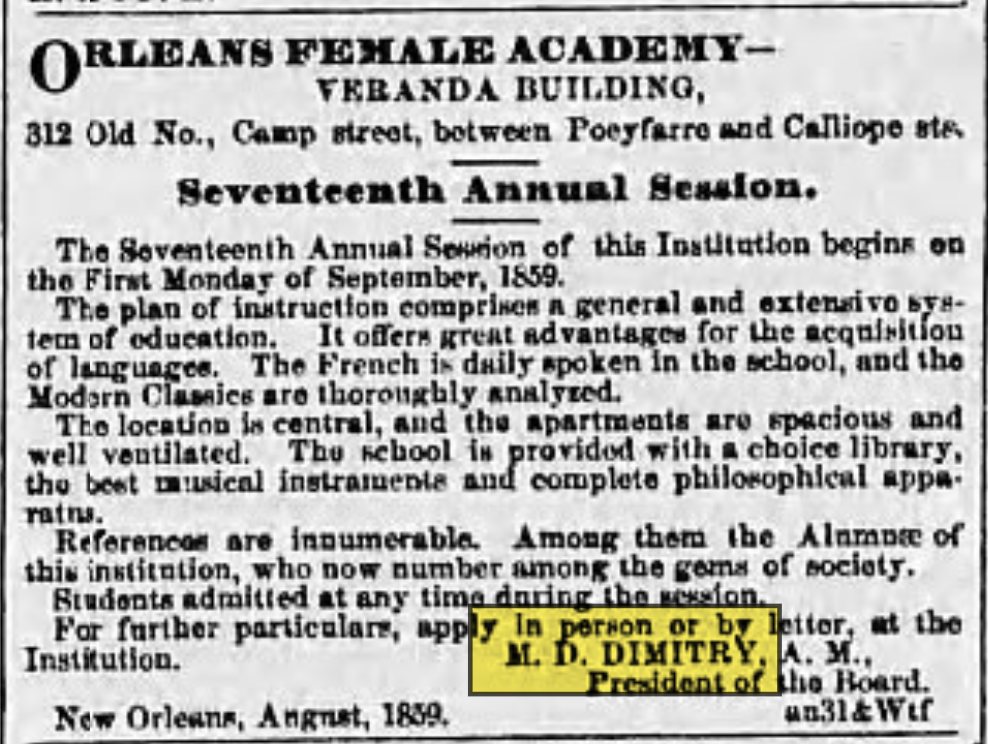
Orleans Female Academy was run by Dracos parents

Dracos' uncle Alexander was also the first person of color to hold that position and the first person of color to be the United States Ambassador to Costa Rica and Nicaragua. From an early age, Dracos was educated by his parents. Due to their African heritage, the Dimitry family underwent countless hardships of racism during the 19th century. The family chose to pass as white as a legal solution and for their safety specifically during the Jim Crow era. Two major court cases were filed dealing with the family's racial ethnicity entitled Forstall, f.p.c. v. Dimitry (1833) and Pandelly v. Wiltz (1854).

Dracos' first cousin was George Pandely. On March 28, 1853, Pandely ran for the position of assistant alderman in New Orleans, a role similar to a city council member. He won the election but he was removed from office when several members of the city of New Orleans presented evidence of his African heritage in a local Newspaper which eventually reached national headlines. It was illegal for people of African descent to hold political office. Pandely sued his accusers soon after and was able to pretend he was descended from a Native American chief's daughter of the Alibamu tribe named Malanta Talla to maintain his social status. The incident became known as the Pandelly Affair. During the Jim Crow era, the family was further forced to appease the growing pressures of racial segregation.

They denounced their African heritage and passed as white. Most of the notable members of the family fought for the Confederacy including his older brother Theodore John Dimitry, Alexander Dimitry, Charles Patton Dimitry, John Bull Smith Dimitry, and George Pandely. Alexander's wife's first cousin Robert Mills Lusher was a proponent of racial segregation in schools. During the final year of Republican occupation in the South in 1877, Dracos was listed as a private in the Louisiana National Guard Company C of the First Crescent City Regiment which was formerly known as the White League.

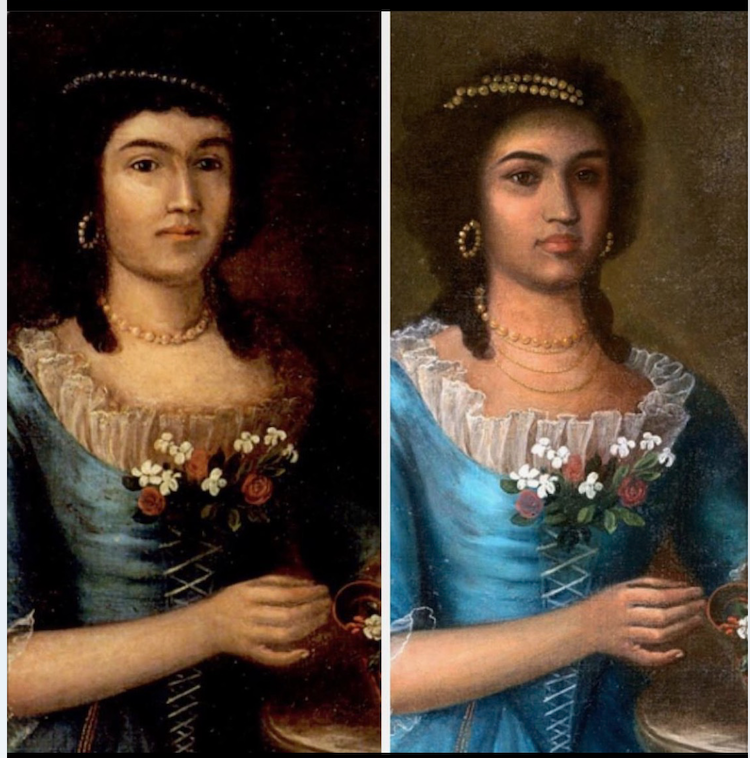
Painting prior to restoration

The painting entitled Marianne Celeste Dragon Dimitry completed between 1790 and 1800 by José Francisco Xavier de Salazar y Mendoza was donated by Dracos' sister Mary Celeste to the Louisiana State Museum regrettably the subject their grandmother was whitened. Luckily historians were able to recompose the original image and show her true characteristics and complexion.

Dracos married his first cousin Virginia Ruth Dimitry's daughter Lizzie D. Ruth who was his second cousin. His first cousin George Pandely also married his first cousin. Pandelly was also the superintendent of the Pontchartrain Railroad and by the 1880s Dracos was listed as the railroad station agent for Carencro and eventually also managed the stations at Jeanerette, and New Iberia, he was a station agent for most of his life. His older brother Theodore John Dimitry was also affiliated with railroad companies.

== Later life ==
Dracos owned a plantation where he lived with his wife and mother-in-law Virginia Ruth Dimitry. He performed various agricultural enterprises including beekeeping. He was very active in his local community. In 1891, Dracos was listed as a councilman for Carencro, Louisiana a position from which his first cousin Pandely was ejected due to his race thirty-eight years prior in New Orleans leading to the Pandelly Affair. The population of Carencro was about two hundred people in the 1890s and shot up to over 400 by 1900. Although Carencro was founded by African, Acadian, and Creole people the toll of Southern politics heavily impacted the small town. African American Republican politicians were constantly attacked and mistreated and black voters were disenfranchised. Two years after his term as councilman Dracos was elected mayor of the small town from 1893 to 1899. His African heritage was confined to the people of New Orleans and memories of the Pandely Affair all but faded. Regrettably during his tenure an African American Republican politician named Telismare Paddio was brutally beaten by a small mob because of a verbal altercation he had with a local judge. Telismare was also affiliated with New Orleans and was an agent in the custom house a position also occupied by Dracos' older brother Theodore. Dracos was a clerk during the elections of 1896 and 1897 for the Republican voters. During the 1890s, he was also a station agent for the Carencro station and by 1900 he was an elected delegate to the Democratic congressional convention. He continued to work as a station agent in Jeanerette (1900–1905) and finally settled at the New Iberia station (1905–1918) towards the end of his life working for both the Southern Pacific Rail Road and the Iberia and Vermillion Rail Road Company which he was also a secretary. By the age of 60, he was elected solicitor of New Iberia regrettably he died that same year. His wife Lizzie lived another twenty years and died in 1938.

Dracos also joined many fraternal whites-only organizations throughout his life including the: New Iberia Lodge No. 554, Benevolent and Protective Order of Elks, Knights of Pythias Lodge No. 39, and the Knights of Honor Lodge No. 3155. Dracos was also a notary public, officer of the Interstate Building and Loan Association, vice president of the Farmers Union, Secretary of the Carencro Social Club, a member of the Good Roads League, and a member of the Atakapas Club. His wife Lizzie was educated and participated in countless charities and soup kitchens including volunteerism for the American Red Cross and Saint Peters Catholic Church of Carencro. His daughter Celeste married a prominent local doctor and his son Dracos Alexander Dimitry was a lieutenant in the early American Airforce.

== Bibliography ==
- Thompson, Shirley Elizabeth (2009). Exiles at Home The Struggle to Become American in Creole New Orleans. Cambridge, MA: Harvard University Press. ISBN 9780674023512.
- Maddox, Joseph H. (August 4, 1853a). "Evidence of Lineage The Pandelly Affair". New Orleans Daily Crescent, Volume 6, No. 129. New Orleans, Louisiana: New Orleans Daily Crescent. p. 3, col. 2. Archived (PDF) from the original on August 25, 2023. "The Pandelly Affair"
- Pecquet du Bellet, Louise (1907a). Some Prominent Virginia Families. Vol. 4. Lynchburg, VA: J. P. Bell Company (Incorporated).
- Foretia, Crystal (April 5, 2023). The Color of Intimacy: Marriage, Passing, and the Legal Strategies of Afro-Creole Women in Antebellum New Orleans (PDF) (Thesis). New York, New York: Columbia University Department of History. Archived (PDF) from the original on July 9, 2023.
- Christophe, Landry (August 18, 2018). "Mixed Marriages In Louisiana Creole Families 164 marriages" (PDF). Louisiana Historic & Cultural Vistas. Archived (PDF) from the original on February 9, 2023.
- Maxwell, W.J. (1916). General Register of Georgetown University. Washington, D.C.: Georgetown University Press.
- Vaudry, W.T. (1877). Roster of the 1st Crescent City Regiment Col. W.T. Vaudry Commanding, to April 25th, 1877. New Orleans, LA: James Buckley Stationary and Printer.
- Mjagkij, Nina (2001). Organizing Black America: An Encyclopedia of African American Associations. New York, NY: Garland Publishing Inc. ISBN 9781135581237.
- Brasseaux, Carl A. (1992). Acadian to Cajun Transformation of a People, 1803-1877. Jackson, Mississippi: University Press of Mississippi. ISBN 9781617031113.
- Horton, Hayward Derrick; Fasching-Varner, Kenneth J.; Martin, Lori Latrice, eds. (2016). After the Storm Militarization, Occupation, and Segregation in Post-Katrina America. New Orleans, LA: Bloomsbury. ISBN 9798216043737.
- Blanchard, Newton C. (1905). Report of the Secretary of State. Baton Rouge, LA: State of Louisiana.
- Pilgrim, . David (June 23, 2024). "The Tragic Mulatto Myth". Big Rapids, Michigan: Ferris State University. Archived from the original on April 2, 2024.
