= John Philip De Haas =

American farmer, military officer and public official

John Philip de Haas
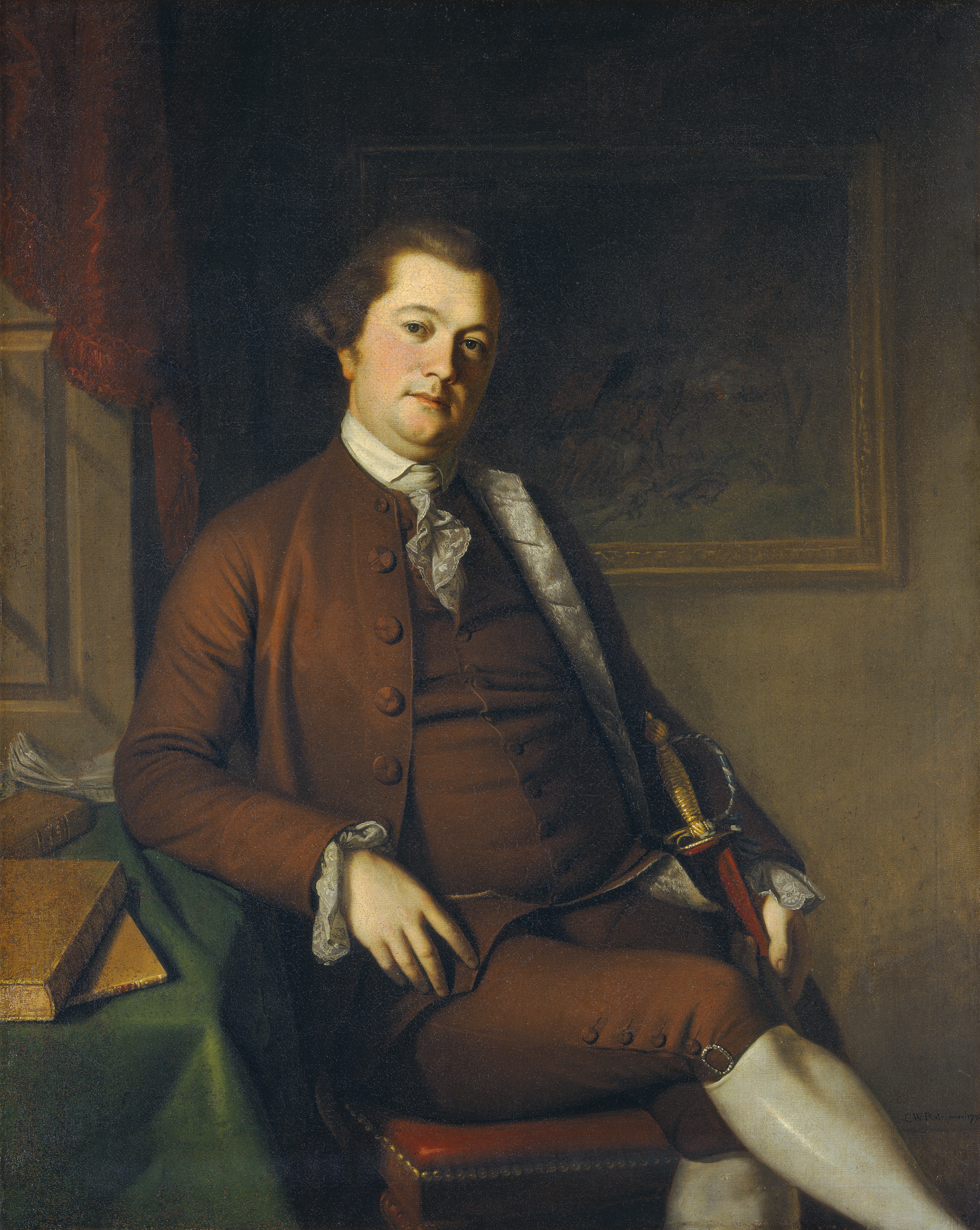
- Portrait by Charles Willson Peale, 1772
- Born: c.1735 Holland
- Died: June 3, 1786; Philadelphia, Pennsylvania, United States
- Burial place: German Reformed Church Graveyard, Easton, Pennsylvania
- Spouse: Eleanor Bingham
- Children: Johann Ludwig de Haas, Charlotta Catharina de Haas, Henrietta de Haas, John Philip de Haas Jr, Jacob de Haas, Eleonora de Haas.
- Relatives: John Nicholas de Haas (Father) Maria Landt (Mother)
- Military career
- Allegiance: British Empire; United States of America
- Branch: British Army (Provincial Troops); Continental Army
- Rank: Major (Britain); Brigadier General; Brevet Major General
- Unit: Provincial Battalion of Pennsylvania
- Commands: 1st Pennsylvania Battalion; 2nd Pennsylvania Regiment
- Conflicts: French and Indian War; Pontiac's War; American Revolutionary War

John Philip de Haas (c.1735 - June 3, 1786) was a Dutch-born American farmer, public official, and military leader who served in several conflicts, most notably as a Brigadier General in the Continental Army during the American War of Independence.

== Early life and education ==
De Haas was born in 1735 in Holland to John Nicholas de Haas, whose lineage was of Prussian origin, and Maria Landt. In 1737, his family emigrated to the Province of Pennsylvania in what was then British America. By 1739, John Nicholas de Haas had taken out a warrant for "one hundred and fifty acres of land in Lebanon Township," which is now Lebanon County, Pennsylvania and started a farm there.

== Career ==
=== Provincial Battalion of Philadelphia ===
De Haas entered the army on December 18, 1757 and was commissioned ensign in the Provincial Battalion of Philadelphia. He was stationed at Fort Augusta which was along the Susquehanna River. He was promoted to adjutant of the first battalion on April 30, 1758 and saw action during the French and Indian War. In September 1758, he was a participant in the expedition to Fort Duquesne and fought in the Battle of Fort Duquesne under the command of John Forbes (British Army officer) and his lieutenant Henry Bouquet. The result of the battle was a British loss, but the French subsequently abandoned the fort when they realized they could not hold out against the large number of enemy forces stationed outside the fort.

He was subsequently promoted to captain on April 28, 1760 and was stationed at Fort Henry. In August 1763, he saw action in the Battle of Bushy Run during Pontiac's War under the command of Henry Bouquet. He was promoted again on August 22, 1764 to major of the Pennsylvania regiment.

=== Pennsylvania Justice of the Peace ===
In between the wars, de Haas acquired a lot of land through his military service including, "a tract of land containing eight hundred and nine acres on Bald Eagle Creek." He also obtained several nearby tracts along the Beech Creek from his fellow officers. His combined land holdings after his service totaled over 1,900 acres and in 1765 he settled in Lebanon, Pennsylvania. He was appointed a Justice of the peace and Justice of the Court of Common Pleas by Pennsylvania governor John Penn (governor) for the county of Lancaster and held the position until the start of the American Revolutionary War.

=== American Revolutionary War ===
In the lead up to the American Revolution in 1774, siding with the colonists, Haas was chairman of a committee which collected any contribution they could for the suffering of the Port of Boston. In 1775, he raised a militia company and in the fall was elected to be colonel of the 1st Pennsylvania Battalion, part of the Pennsylvania Line, however he resigned on January 20, 1776. He subsequently rejoined the army on February 22, 1776 when he was again appointed colonel. General George Washington's papers contain a report on the troop strength of the 1st Pennsylvania Regiment under the command of "Col. John P. De Haas" dated December 8, 1776.

During his second command of the 1st Pennsylvania Regiment, he marched to Quebec. After that, he served at Ticonderoga and Fort George. In February 1777, de Haas was named brigadier general and ordered to take charge of a brigade under General George Washington. However, he did not confirm his promotion or take over his new command, prompting Washington to inquire if he was still with the army. In June, Washington was informed of Haas's resignation. Nonetheless, in 1778, he briefly was back in the war, volunteering to lead militia in the protection of the Pennsylvania frontier in the aftermath of the Battle of Wyoming, eventually handing over command to regular Colonel Thomas Hartley. He returned to Philadelphia in 1779 and was brevetted major general in 1780.

== Personal life ==
De Haas married Eleanor Bingham, and the couple had six children: Johann Ludwig de Haas, Charlotta Catharina de Haas, Henrietta de Haas, John Philip de Haas Jr., Jacob de Haas, and Eleonora de Haas.

== Death ==
After de Haas retired, he ended up enjoying his last years in a home in Philadelphia until his death on June 3, 1786.

Following his death, de Haas was interred at the German Reformed Church of Easton in Easton, Pennsylvania, which subsequently became the First United Church of Easton. By the 1900's, the graveyard was going unused and so the land was sold. The Easton Area Public Library was built on the site. Bodies that were located were reported to heirs, and they were afforded the opportunity to move and re-inter the bodies. Bodies that went unclaimed were reburied in a vault on the site. It is unclear if de Haas' remains are still at the site.

== See also ==
- List of military leaders in the American Revolutionary War
