= 2nd Pennsylvania Regiment =

- Active: 1775–1783
- Allegiance: (United States) Second Continental Congress
- Type: Infantry
- Part of: Pennsylvania Line
- Nickname: Pennsylvania Battalion Veterans
- Colors: Brown with green facing until blue with scarlet facing regulation post Valley Forge
- Engagements: Battle of Long Island (1776); Battle of Valcour Island (1776); Battle of Trenton (1776); Battle of Brandywine (1777); Battle of Germantown (1777); Battle of Monmouth (1778); Battle of Stony Point (1779); Battle of Springfield (1780); Battle of Green Spring (1781); Siege of Yorktown (1781)

Commanders
- Notable commanders: Colonel John Bull; Colonel John Philip De Haas; Colonel James Irvine; Colonel Henry Bicker; Colonel Walter Stewart

The 2nd Pennsylvania Regiment, formed with lauded veterans from the 1st Pennsylvania Battalion, was raised in December 1776. The 1st Pennsylvania Battalion was raised in October 1775, under the command of Colonel John Bull for service with the Continental Army.

== History ==
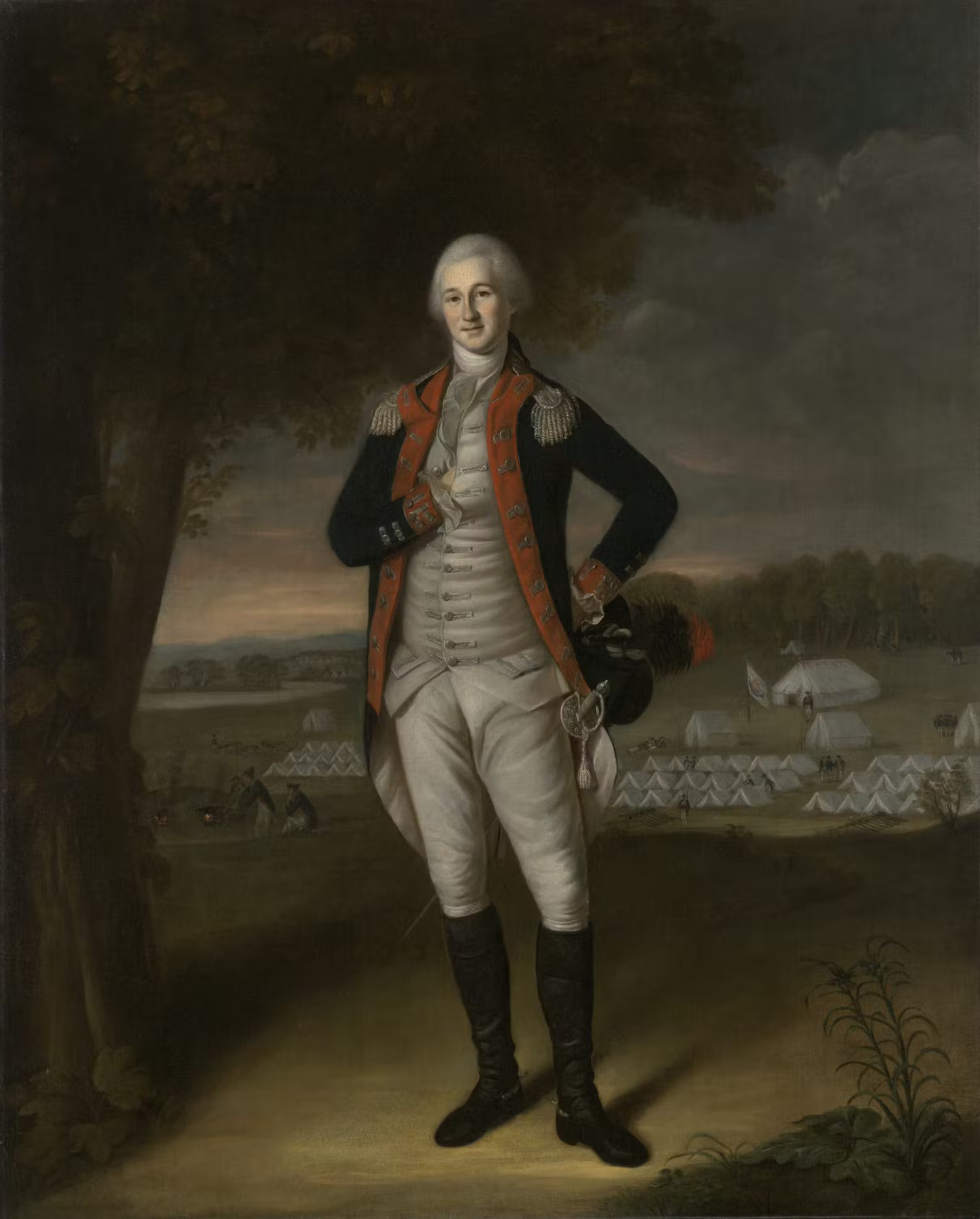
As a young officer, Colonel Walter Stewart was nicknamed "The Irish Beauty" by the ladies of Philadelphia. A close friend of Anthony Wayne's and well acquainted with George Washington, diarist Joseph Plumb Martin described Stewart as "an excellent officer, much beloved and respected by the troops of the Line he belonged to."

The regiment and its predecessor the 1st Pennsylvania Battalion saw action during the Battles of Brooklyn, Valcour Island, Trenton, the Brandywine, Germantown, Monmouth, and Springfield. The regiment was furloughed on June 11, 1783, in Philadelphia, and disbanded on November 15, 1783.

In January 1776, the 1st Pennsylvania Battalion took part in Benedict Arnold's failed attempt to capture Quebec. With little to no winter clothing and half their muskets not in workable condition, the men struggled into Canada, their strength reduced by sickness. By March 30, four of the companies had arrived at the American lines near Quebec, but before the remainder could come up the attack was abandoned and the battalion started the retreat to New York. The regiment was encamped with the American Army at Fort Ticonderoga. In October it participated in Anthony Wayne's defeat of the British at Valcour Island. It remained at Ticonderoga until November 13 to await the arrival of replacement troops. By December 8 a remnant of the First Battalion was at New Germantown, New Jersey, but most of the men had been mustered out of service.

During this time, Congress realized a more substantial national army with enlistments longer than 12 months would be needed to fight the war successfully. Pennsylvania was assigned to provide 12 of these "Continental" regiments and decided to use the battalions created in 1775 as the foundation for the state's quota. The 1st Pennsylvania Rifles, being the first unit formed by the state, became the First Pennsylvania Regiment, while the 1st Pennsylvania Battalion became the nucleus of the 2nd Pennsylvania Regiment.

Despite hardship, about 340 of the nearly 500 men who had been with the 1st Battalion at Ticonderoga joined the 2nd Pennsylvania Regiment in Trenton, where they served in a brigade under Brig. Gen. Thomas Mifflin and supported Washington's Continental Army in the Battle of Princeton on January 3, 1777.

The regiment spent the winter months at Morristown, New Jersey, where it built up strength and was placed in Gen. Anthony Wayne's Division. Col. Henry Bicker was appointed to lead the regiment but did not actually join until the following October. In the meantime, the regiment was commanded by the senior officer present for duty, Major William Williams.

Williams led the unit in patrol actions in New Jersey during the spring and summer, including an engagement at Bound Brook on April 11 or 12 and a skirmish at Amboy on April 25 in which one officer was killed. At the Battle of Brandywine, the regiment was part of the force guarding Chadds Ford, Pennsylvania, until the British stormed across the creek and compelled Wayne's Division to withdraw.

The unit sustained casualties, including one officer killed, at Paoli on September 21, at the Battle of Germantown when the left flank of the Continental Army's troops attacked the British center that was mistakenly fired on by other Continental Army troops. By the end of October, the unit had suffered substantially from all the fighting, including the loss of Major Williams who was captured at Germantown. Capt. Joseph Howell became acting regimental commander and the Second Pennsylvania Regiment numbered only 13 other officers and 74 enlisted men present for duty at the end of the month.

The few present were able to man a section of the army's first line of defense at Whitemarsh in early December, before moving with the rest of Washington's forces into the legendary winter encampment at Valley Forge. There the regiment trained in Von Steuben's new manual of arms and brought itself up to strength.

With France entering the conflict on the side of the new United States in May, the British abandoned Philadelphia and moved across New Jersey to the more easily defended stronghold of New York City.

On June 19, 1778, the Continental Army left Valley Forge in pursuit and engaged the British in the Battle of Monmouth on an extremely hot June 28. Here the Second Pennsylvania served in a provisional brigade commanded by Lt. Col. Aaron Burr and made a charge from the American left flank into a British force trying to assault the American center. It halted the British attack but was itself compelled to retire under subsequent artillery fire. The regiment lost two men wounded in this action.

On July 1, 1778, the regiment absorbed the remainder of the 13th Pennsylvania Regiment, most of its men's enlistments having expired. The colonel of the 13th, 23-year-old Walter Stewart, became the Second's new commander. Joseph Howell Jr., previously a captain in Pennsylvania Musketry Battalion before being taken prisoner at the August 1776 Battle of Long Island, was appointed as regimental paymaster with the rank of major. The young officer, nicknamed "The Irish Beauty" by the ladies of Philadelphia, was a close friend of Anthony Wayne's and was well acquainted with Washington. He was an able leader with a reputation of taking care of the welfare of his men. Diarist Joseph Plumb Martin described him as "an excellent officer, much beloved and respected by the troops of the Line he belonged to."

Under Stewart, the regiment operated along the New York-New Jersey border and moved to Middlebrook, New Jersey, in early December for the winter of 1778–79. There is no particular record that the unit was involved in any fighting that summer, but in October 1779, it had 452 officers and men with Wayne at West Point. From there it moved to Morristown, New Jersey, for the encampment in Jockey Hollow where it endured the most brutal winter of the 18th century.

When spring came, the regiment was again actively engaged in patrols and skirmishes with British forays from New York. On May 18, the unit lost a junior officer killed in a fight at Paramus. On June 7. it fought at Connecticut Farms and on June 21 was at "the blockhouse" at Bergen Heights, where it joined the First Pennsylvania Regiment in a gallant but futile headlong charge on a sturdy Loyalist fortification despite the attempts of the officers to restrain the men. Two lieutenants were mortally wounded here and a number of men killed.

On September 21, the regiment was in Hartford, Connecticut, with Wayne to greet French General Rochambeau. On September 25, it rushed from Tappan, New York, to West Point to reinforce the garrison there after Benedict Arnold's treachery was discovered.

In December, the 2nd Regiment returned to Morristown for another winter. On January 1, 1781, a mutiny of the Pennsylvania troops transpired. At first, the regiment refused to join the mutineers, but were finally forced to when the other troops threatened them at bayonet point and with artillery.

The resulting restructuring of the Pennsylvania Line perpetuated a 2nd Regiment among the state's six reorganized units, with Walter Stewart still in command. However, the men who remained in service were all redistributed among all these units and this establishment was mostly on paper.

The old 2nd Pennsylvania ceased to exist before the final campaign in Virginia and South Carolina, although former members of the regiment were battle casualties at Green Springs on July 6 and Yorktown in October.
