= Elizabeth Virginia Dimitry Ruth =

American educator and author (1839–1891)

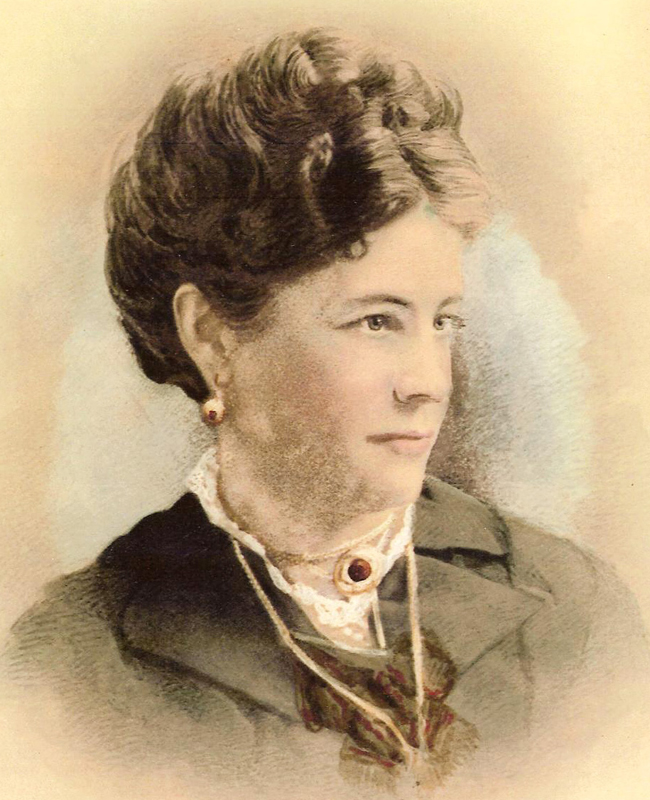
- Born: September 3, 1839; Washington, D.C., U.S.
- Died: September 22, 1891 (aged 52); Corencro, Louisiana, U.S.
- Resting place: Saint Peter's Cemetery, New Iberia, Louisiana
- Education: Saint Charles Parish; Orleans Female Academy
- Occupations: Poet; Writer; Educator
- Spouse: Captain Enoch Fenwick Ruth
- Relatives: John Bull Smith Dimitry; Charles Patton Dimitry; Thomas Dabney Dimitry; Ernest Lagarde; George Pandely; Marianne Celeste Dragon
- Writing career
- Pen name: Virginia Dimitry Ruth
- Years active: 1865-1891
- Genre: Southern Literature
- Parents: Alexander Dimitry (father); Mary Powell Mills (mother)
- Family: Dimitry family (Creoles)

Elizabeth Virginia Dimitry Ruth (September 3, 1839 - September 22, 1891) was a poet, author, and educator. Virginia was the mixed-race Creole daughter of Alexander Dimitry and one of the few educated family members who did not attend Georgetown like her mixed-race father, siblings, and uncles. Both of her brothers, Charles Patton Dimitry and John Bull Smith Dimitry, obtained degrees at the institution and became well-known Southern authors. Virginia wrote a book of poetry and a novel. She was honored by her student, American author George Augustin, who dedicated the book Romances of New Orleans to her. Her one daughter, Lizzie D. Ruth, married her Creole first cousin, Dracos Anthony Dimitry. He was also the mayor of Corencro. Her daughter's marriage was one of the few instances where members of the Dimitry family chose to marry Creoles instead of mixing with whites. Another such case was George Pandely, who also chose to marry his first cousin, who was also Creole. Virginia's family underwent racial hardships during her lifetime, some of which resulted in prominent legal cases, including: Forstall, f.p.c. v. Dimitry (1833) and Pandelly v. Wiltz (1854).

Virginia was born in Washington, DC, to Alexander Dimitry and Mary Powell Mills. She was raised in New Orleans by a prominent, educated Creole family. On December 31, 1856, she was involved in a mixed-race marriage to Enoch Fenwick Ruth at the age of seventeen. Enoch was active in the Department of Indian Affairs as Chief Clerk of the Finance Division and eventually became Secretary of the Commission to establish a treaty with the Minneconjon Indians in 1865. Virginia's husband, Enoch, sadly committed suicide in 1867. After which, Virginia migrated to New Orleans, where she became active in education following the footsteps of her father, Alexander. She established the Select School, which was active from 1878 to 1882. Virginia was also an active Southern writer. Virginia migrated to Corencro, where she lived out the rest of her life on the plantation of her daughter, Lizzie D. Ruth, and son-in-law, Dracos Anthony Dimitry. Virginia died the same year her son-in-law became a councilman on September 22, 1891, at fifty-two years of age.

== History ==
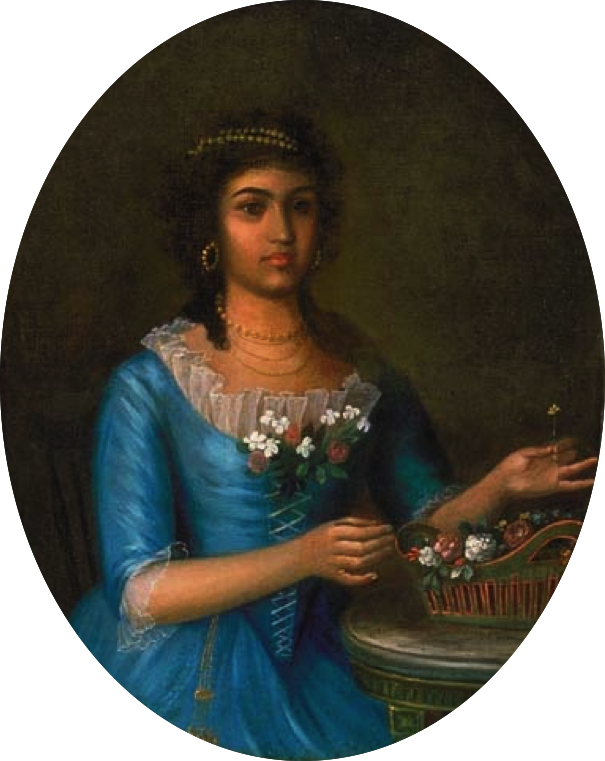
Virginia's grandmother Marianne Celeste Dragon

Eliza Virginia Mills Dimitry was born in Washington, D.C., to Alexander Dimitry and Mary Powell Mills. Mills was the daughter of prominent American architect Robert Mills. Virginia's grandparents and parents were involved in mixed-race marriages. Her grandmother was Creole socialite Marianne Celeste Dragon, who was involved in a court case dealing with her race in the 1830s called Forstall, f.p.c. v. Dimitry (1833) and on record she was listed as white. Virginia was part of the Dimitry family. The Dimitry family underwent countless hardships of racism throughout the 19th century. Her father, Alexander, was antagonized about his African heritage from a young age and throughout his entire life. Virginia was raised in New Orleans, Louisiana. Her father, Alexander, founded a school in 1842, and her uncle, John Baptiste Michael Dracos Dimitry, also started a school for girls named The Orleans Female Academy around the same period. Virginia's mixed-race father, uncle, and brothers all attended Georgetown University, but she did not. She had many opportunities to become educated and eventually became a writer and educator.

Virginia was about six years old when her father became the first person of color and the first Louisiana superintendent of public education in 1847, a position he held until 1849. In 1853, her first cousin George Pandely was involved in a racial incident known as the Pandelly Affair. He was accused of running for public office as a person of African descent. It was not legal at the time for people of African descent to hold office. He resigned in 1853 and the incident was published in newspapers across the country, sending shockwaves throughout the identity of the Dimitry family. Pandelly took his accuser to court for slander. He persistently declared that his family was of American Indian descent, not African, further humiliating the entire family, who were forced to hide their identity.

After the traumatic racial incidents, the Dimitry family decided to claim descent from a fictitious, Native American chief's daughter of the Alibamu tribe named Malanta Talla to maintain their social status. Virginia's real grandmother and great-grandmother were not of Native American descent. Her great-grandmother was a former slave named Marie Françoise Chauvin Beaulieu de Montplaisir. She was the daughter of a slave named Marianne Lalande. Both slaves belonged to Mr. Charles Daprémont de La Lande, a member of the Superior Council. Historian Charles Gayarré continually insulted the Dimitry family and the entire Creole population due to evidence of African descent. Her grandmother Marianne Celeste Dragon died on April 22, 1856, at 78 years of age.

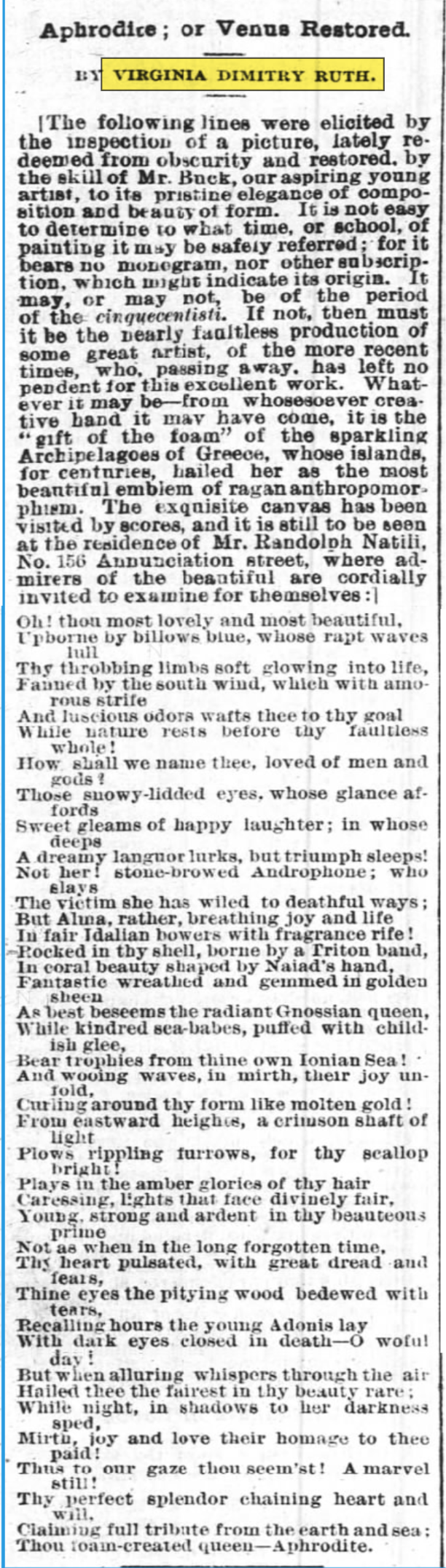
Aphrodite or Venus Restored

The same year as the death of her grandmother, Virginia married Captain Enoch Fenwick Ruth (1816-1867) at the age of seventeen on December 31, 1856, in Washington, DC. Enoch worked for the US government. Virginia's father, Alexander, and her brother John were both in Washington working at the State Department. Enoch commanded an Arkansas company in the Mexican–American War and obtained the rank of Captain. Captain Enoch was Chief Clerk of the Finance Division, Indian Office, Department of the Interior, eventually becoming Secretary of the Commission to establish a treaty with the Minneconjon Indians in 1865. Enoch worked at the Department of Indian Affairs for years and had access to American Indian historical records. Recall that the family fabricated their lineage on public record to portray descendants of the American Indian Alibamu tribe. During the American Civil War, most of the Dimitry family served the Confederate cause, but Enoch continued to work for the Union government. Regretably, he committed suicide in 1867 and was found floating in Washington, DC, by a tugboat. The couple had four children.

Virginia moved back to New Orleans, where the mixed-race family began to encounter the harsh new system known as Jim Crow. Her father, Alexander Dimitry, was the New Orleans assistant superintendent of public education between 1867 and 1868. Virginia was involved in education. Alexander was one of the vice presidents during the Grand Unification Mass Meeting in 1873 to desegregate schools in Louisiana during the Jim Crow era. Conversely, Alexander's wife's first cousin Robert Mills Lusher was also an educator and eventually became the Louisiana superintendent of public education, supporting the segregation of schools following pressure from the local community. Virginia was briefly an assistant at Lusher's school, known as the Commercial and Classical Academy or Lusher's Academy, eventually opening her own school called the Select School in the 1870s.

The Select School was a private school for boys and girls, teaching Spanish, English, French, and German. The school also taught music, arithmetic, spelling, penmanship, and prepared boys under sixteen for college. It was located at 139 Robin Street in New Orleans, Louisiana, and functioned between 1878 and 1882.

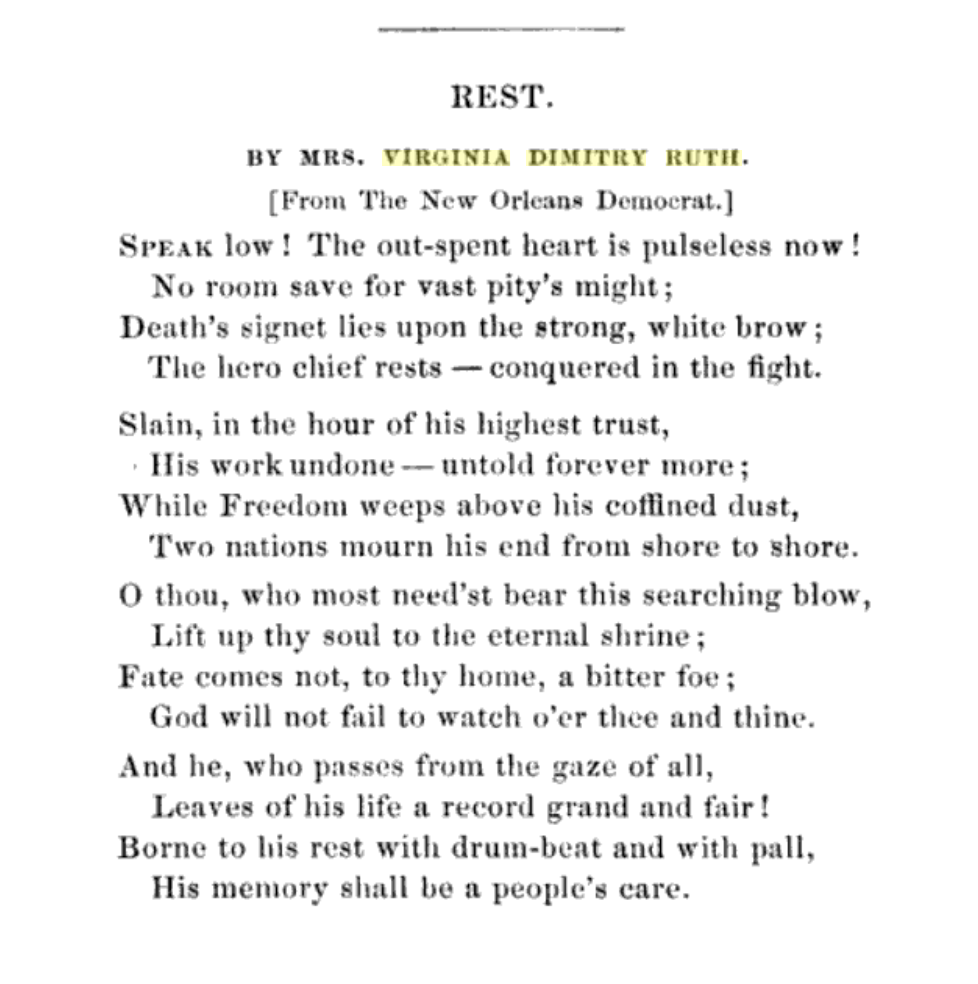
Rest

Her daughter Lizzie D. Ruth married her Creole first cousin Dracos Anthony Dimitry in 1882. Virginia's father, Alexander, died on January 30, 1883. Virginia moved to Corencro, where she lived with her son-in-law, Dracos Anthony Dimitry, and daughter, Lizzie D. Ruth, on their plantation. Some of their enterprises included beekeeping. Dracos was also the railroad station agent for Carencro, and in 1891, he became a city councilman for the same city, eventually becoming mayor. Sadly, Virginia died the same year her son-in-law became councilman on September 22, 1891, at 52 years of age in Carencro. Virginia left such a profound impact on her students that author George Augustin dedicated his book Romances of New Orleans to his favorite teacher, Virginia, on page 3: To That Graceful Southern Writer and Gifted Scholar, Mrs. Virginia Dimitry Ruth, His book is Affectionately Dedicated. The 1891 book was an anthology of eight New Orleans-themed short stories and several poems featuring old New Orleans. The book wrote favorably about the Creole community. Augustin was also the owner of The Creole Fireside a New Orleans weekly paper.

== Southern Writer ==
Virginia's father, Alexander, was a prominent Creole writer, and her brother Charles Patton Dimitry had the largest writing output of her immediate family. Her father and Charles went by the pseudonyms Tobias Guarnerius and Tobias Guarnerius Jr. Charles also used the pseudonym Braddock Field. Virginia eventually adopted the name Virginia Dimitry Ruth. Her other brother John Bull Smith Dimitry was also a writer, but did not have the same output as Charles. Both her brothers wrote stories about American Indians. Charles wrote the Massacre of Saint Andre in 1884, and John wrote Onatoga's Sacrifice and Atahualpa's Curtain in 1888. In 1865, Virginia wrote The Furling of the Flag, April 9th, 1865 and she finished a poem in 1877 honoring a painting discovered by her first cousin, the Baron Randolph Natili, entitled Aphrodite or Venus Restored. Finally, in 1882, she wrote the poem Rest. Virginia also completed a novel and a book of poetry throughout her lifetime.

== Literary work ==
Books and Articles authored by Virginia Dimitry Ruth
Date	Title
1865	The Furling of the Flag, April 9th, 1865
1877	Aphrodite or Venus Restored
1882	Rest

== Bibliography ==
- Pecquet du Bellet, Louise (1907a). Some Prominent Virginia Families. Vol. 4. Lynchburg,VA: J. P. Bell Company (Incorporated).
- Pecquet du Bellet, Louise (1907). Some Prominent Virginia Families. Vol. 3. Lynchburg,VA: J. P. Bell Company Incorporated.
- Foretia, Crystal (April 5, 2023). The Color of Intimacy: Marriage, Passing, and the Legal Strategies of Afro-Creole Women in Antebellum New Orleans (PDF) (Thesis). New York, New York: Columbia University Department of History. Archived from the original (PDF) on July 9, 2023.
- Christophe, Landry (August 18, 2018). "Mixed Marriages In Louisiana Creole Families 164 marriages" (PDF). Louisiana Historic & Cultural Vistas. Archived (PDF) from the original on February 9, 2023.
- Maddox, Joseph H. (August 4, 1853a). "Evidence of Lineage The Pandelly Affair". New Orleans Daily Crescent, Volume 6, No. 129. New Orleans, Louisiana: New Orleans Daily Crescent. p. 3, col. 2. Archived (PDF) from the original on August 25, 2023. "The Pandelly Affair"
- Thompson, Shirley Elizabeth (2009). Exiles at Home The Struggle to Become American in Creole New Orleans. Cambridge, MA: Harvard University Press. ISBN 9780674023512.
- Broyard, Bliss (2007). One Drop My Father's Hidden Life A Story of Race and Family Secrets. New York, New York: Little Brown and Company. ISBN 9780316019736.
- Sanger, George P. (1868). By the Authority of Congress the Statutes at Large, Treaties and Proclamations of the United States of America from December 1865 to March 1867. Vol. 14. Boston, MA: Little, Brown and Company.
- Wood, John Seymour, ed. (1895). "The Bachelor of Arts A Monthly Magazine Devoted to University Interests and General Literature". The Bachelor of Arts Company. Dixiana. Vol. 2. New York, New York: The Bachelor of Arts Company. "Mrs. Virginia Dimitry Ruth, has written a book of poetry and a novel"
- Arthur, Stanley Clisby; Huchet de Kernion, George Campbell (2009). Old Families of Louisiana. Baton Rouge, LA: Clearfield Publishing. "Eliza Virginia Ruth, a daughter of Alexander Dimitry, married Captain Enoch Fenwick Ruth of Baltimore, who served in the Indian Bureau at Washington. Returning to Louisiana a widow, she wrote under the name of Virginia Dimitry Ruth. She was one of the pioneer women writers. Following the trend of her pedagogic family, she was an educator, having her private school for young ladies, an institution recognized for its splendid educational system and culture. She had three daughters: Elizabeth Dimitry Ruth, who married Dracos A. Dimitry, her cousin; Margaret Dimitry Ruth, who married Louis Grey Norwell, and Genevieve Ruth, who married Louis A. Veazey."
- Herringshaw, Thomas William, ed. (1915). "George Augustin". Herringshaw's American Blue-book of Biography. Chicago, IL: American Publishers Association. "Augustin, George, author, journalist, poet; son of the late judge James Augustin by his wife Micaela Fortier, born February 22, 1866; educated in private schools and colleges; was a pupil of Mrs. Virginia Dimitry Ruth (deceased), daughter of the late Professor Alexander Dimitry, who was a distinguished author and linguist."
- Augustin, George (1891). Romances of New Orleans. New Orleans, LA: L. Graham & Son. "To That Graceful Southern Writer and Gifted Scholar, Mrs. Virginia Dimitry Ruth, His book is Affectionately Dedicated."
- Tucker, Susan (2016). City of Remembering: A History of Genealogy in New Orleans. Jackson, MI: University Press of Mississippi. ISBN 9781496806222.
- Chambers, William (1854). Things as They are in America. Philadelphia, PA: Lippincott, Grambo & Company.
- Reeves, William Dale (1999). Paths to Distinction Dr. James White, Governor E.D. White, and Chief Justice Edward Douglass White of Louisiana. Lafayette, LA: University of Louisiana at Lafayette. ISBN 9781887366335.
- Johnson, Rossiter; Brown, John Howard, eds. (1904). "Charles Patton Dimitry". The Twentieth Century Biographical Dictionary of Notable Americans. Cowan-Erich. Vol. 3. Boston, MA: The Biographical Society.
- Mount, May W. (1896). Some Notables of New Orleans Biographical and Descriptive Sketches of the Artists of New Orleans, and Their Work George Augustin. New Orleans, LA: May W. Mount.
- Pippenger, Wesley E (2009). District of Columbia Marriage Licenses, Register 1 1811-1858. Westminster, Maryland: Heritage Books, Inc.
