= Theodore John Dimitry Jr. =

Louisiana Creole Physician and Professor

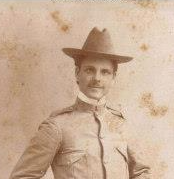
- Born: June 26, 1879; New Orleans, Louisiana
- Died: October 27, 1945 (aged 66); New Orleans, Louisiana
- Resting place: Metairie Cemetery
- Education: Tulane University
- Known for: Dimitry Erisiphake; Plastic Eye (lucite)
- Spouse: Fernande Jacobs (m. 1901–1945)
- Children: Earl Dimitry; Theodore Joseph Dimitry Jr.
- Father: Theodore John Dimitry
- Relatives: Marianne Celeste Dragon; George Pandely; Ernest Lagarde; Charles Patton Dimitry
- Scientific career
- Fields: Medicine; Optometry
- Workplaces: Tulane University; Loyola University; Charity Hospital; Louisiana State University; Hôtel-Dieu
- Family: Dimitry Family (Creoles)

Theodore John Dimitry Jr. (June 26, 1879 - October 27, 1945) was a Creole physician, optometrist, professor, author and inventor. He was a pioneer in the field of optometry responsible for developing the Dimitry Erisiphake and a plastic eye made of lucite to permit motion. Theodore's vast contribution to the field of optometry also included the publication of hundreds of articles in different medical journals. He was a member of one of the oldest Creole families in New Orleans known as the Dimitry Family. His great-grandmother was Marianne Celeste Dragon and Theodore's older brother was prominent New Orleans attorney Michael Dracos Dimitry who represented Lulu White.

Theodore was born in New Orleans to Theodore John Dimitry Sr. and Irene Scott. By 1901, Theodore Jr. obtained a degree in medicine from Tulane University. Early in his medical career, he worked for various government institutions in Louisiana. By 1908, he began to conduct medical research in the field of optometry and teach at Tulane University. Eventually, he taught at Loyola University and began to write papers on the subjects of trachoma, cataract, glaucoma, enucleation of the eye and ptosis. Theodore began to publish his research on artificial eyes in 1918. He continued his career in teaching and academic research until the 1940s.

Theodore was the head of the ophthalmology department at Louisiana State University and also the head of the ophthalmology department at Charity Hospital in New Orleans. He was a regent in the South of the International College of Surgeons and a member of countless medical organizations including: the American College of Surgeons, and the Louisiana Medical Association. Theodore was the vice president of the Ophthalmological and Otolaryngological Club of Orleans Parish Medical Society. He was honored by Loyola University for distinction in the field of optometry. Both of his sons Earl Dimitry and Theodore Joseph Dimitry Jr. became medical doctors. Countless institutions were shocked by his death due to his valuable continued contribution to the field of medicine. He died at 66 years of age after a prolonged illness that lasted one year. He was buried at Metairie Cemetery in New Orleans.

== History ==
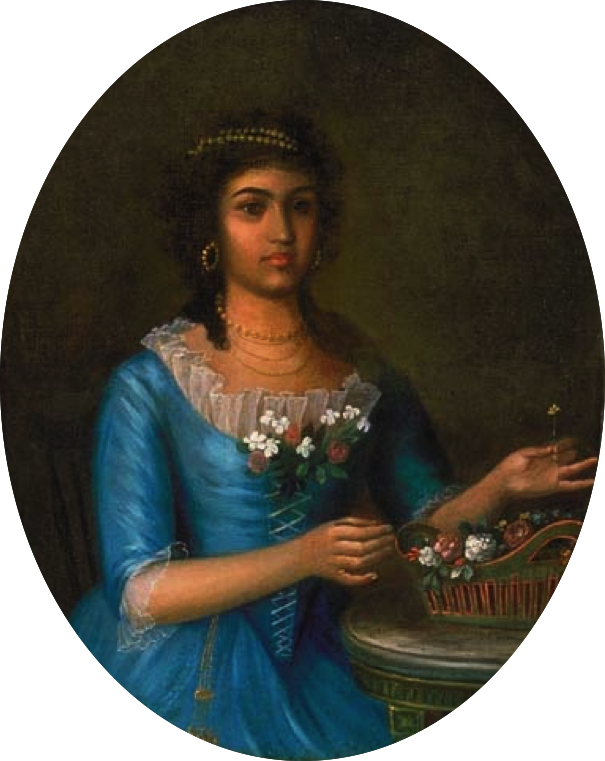
Theodore's great-grandmother Marianne Céleste Dragon

Theodore was born in New Orleans to Theodore John Dimitry Sr. and Irene Scott. His great-grandmother was Marianne Celeste Dragon a mixed Creole of partial Greek ancestry. She founded the Dimitry Family along with Greek Andrea Dimitry which was a mixed-race Creole family that endured countless racial hardships during the 1800s. Theodore's father attended Georgetown along with other prominent Creole family members. His father's first cousins included George Pandely and Charles Patton Dimitry. By 1901, Theodore Jr. obtained a degree in medicine from Tulane University and married Fernande Jacobs on August 28, 1901. Theodore was the resident medical doctor inspecting fruit at the ports of the state of Louisiana in 1903. In 1910, he joined the American Medical Association. During the 1911–1912 school year, he was listed as a lecturer and clinical assistant in diseases of the eye at Tulane University. Early in his academic career, Theodore published articles about complex medical procedures in the field of optometry. He was the oculist for the Southern Pacific Railway of New Orleans in 1913. One year later, he was chief of the eye division at Charity Hospital a position he held for the next thirty years. Theodore was the oculist of the New Orleans public schools in 1915 and that same year his accumulated published research included work on cataract extraction and tarsal massage for patients suffering trachoma. Theodore was also a professor at Loyola University in New Orleans a position he held for the next twenty-five years.

He made recommendations to the delegates of the Louisiana State Medical Society in 1917 and in 1919 he was part of a Diagnostic Clinic in New Orleans. That same year he was elected a member of the American Journal of Public Health. Around the same period Theodore published research in the field of artificial eyes namely improvements to the Snellen artificial eye.

During the 1920s he continued his research and was chief visiting ophthalmologist to Charity Hospital and in 1922 he was also elected president of the visiting staff of surgeons and physicians to the same institution. He published his research relating to glaucoma and enucleation of the eye in the papers entitled The Tarsus Made Pliable as a Cure for Glaucoma and Eviscero-neurotomy with an Endothesis as a Substitute for Enucleation. By the 1930s Theodore was a pioneer in the field of optometry and invented the Dimitry erisiphake to remove cataracts from the eye. The device worked on a vacuum principle. Around the same period, he published A Vacuum Grasping Instrument for Removal of Cataract in Capsule and The Dust Factor in the Production of Pterygium.

By the 1940s, he further developed the artificial eye presenting it to the International Assembly of the International College of Surgeons. Theodore's artificial eye was made from acrylic resins, the substance used to manufacture lucite. The eye fit the socket grasping the eye muscles and turned like a real eye. Ahead of his death, he was the head of the ophthalmology department at Louisiana State University and also the head of the ophthalmology department at Charity Hospital in New Orleans. Theodore was sick for one year before his death. He died at 66 years old in New Orleans. He was buried at Metairie Cemetery in New Orleans. His two sons Dr. Earl Dimitry (1910-1995) and Dr. Theodore Joseph Dimitry Jr. (1906-1982) continued his legacy.

Dimitry's contributions to early American ophthalmology have been noted in regional medical histories.

== Literary work ==
Books and Articles authored by Theodore John Dimitry Jr.
Date	Title
1911	Extirpation of the Lachrymal Sac
1911	The Muscle and Tuck Operation as Adopted at the Eye, Ear, Nose and Throat Hospital, New Orleans
1911	The Motais Operation as Performed at the Eye, Ear, Nose and Throat Hospital, New Orleans LA
1914	Bacillus Bulgaricus in the Treatment of Pyorrhea Alveolaris
1915	How to Fit Glasses
1916	Tarsal Massage in Trachoma
1916	Two Cases of Trachoma in Native Born Louisianas
1917	A Suggestion for Improved Prosthesis
1917	Injury of the Sympathetic in Enucleation
1919	An Operation Relegating Enucleation of the Eye to its Proper Position
1920	The Nut
1920	Trachoma Exists in Louisiana and Justifies Investigation
1921	Hereditary Ptosis
1921	The Tarsus Made Pliable as a Cure for Glaucoma
1922	Chromium Sulphate, A Valuable Therapeutic Agent in Eye Pathology
1922	The Early Nursing Care of Leprosy in La
1922	Eviscero-neurotomy with an Endothesis as a Substitute for Enucleation
1933	The First North American Nurse
1933	A Vacuum Grasping Instrument for Removal of Cataract in Capsule
1937	The Dust Factor in the Production of Pterygium
1938	Fundamentals of Pterygium Surgery
1937	Introduction of Leprosy Into Louisiana, and the First Leper Hospitals
1939	Evolution of a Sucking Disk for Iintracapsular Extraction of Cataract
1940	Vacuum Massage of the Eyeball
1944	The Socket after Enucleation and the Artificial Eye

== See also ==
- Pandelly Affair

== Bibliography ==
- Pecquet du Bellet, Louise (1907a). Some Prominent Virginia Families. Vol. 4. Lynchburg, VA: J. P. Bell Company (Incorporated).
- Jackson, Edward (January 1922). "Personals". American Journal of Ophthalmology. 3. 5 (1): 123–132.
- Wood, Casey A., ed. (1918). "T.J. Dimitry". The American Encyclopedia and Dictionary of Ophthalmology. Phonoscope-Protozoic Disease of the Lids. Vol. 13. Cleveland, OH: Chicago Cleveland Press.
- Dyer, Isadore; Chassaignac, Chase (November 1919). "Diagnostic Clinic". American Journal of Ophthalmology. 72 (5): 123–132.
- Fortes, Frank P. (September 7, 1901). "Dimitry - Jacob". International Record of Medicine and General Practice Clinics. 70. New York, NY.
- Lerch, Otto (March 1903). "Resident Inspectors at the Fruit Ports Chosen were: Belize, Dr. Theodore J, Dimitry". The New Orleans Medical and Surgical Journal. July 1902 to June 1903. 55 (9). New Orleans, Louisiana: The I. Graham Co. Ltd.
- Wogan, L. Andre (May 1912). "Dr. Theodore J, Dimitry". Bulletin of the Tulane University of Louisiana. 13 (5). Tulane University of Louisiana.
- Morse, John Lovett (August 1910). "Personal-The Four Men From Louisiana who Joined the A.M.A." The New Orleans Medical and Surgical Journal. July 1910 to June 1911. 63 (2). New Orleans, Louisiana: The I. Graham Co. Ltd.
- Danna, Jos A. (1916). Loyola University 1915-1916. New Orleans, Louisiana: Loyola University Press.
- Brawley, Frank (September 1913). "Dr. T.J. Dimitry Has Been Appointed oculist for the Southern Pacific Railway of New Orleans". The Ophthalmic Record. 22 (9). Chicago, Il.
- Hill, Emory (January 1914). "The Charity Hospital of New Orleans announces the Following Officers". The Ophthalmic Record. 23 (1). Chicago, Il.
- Dyer, Isadore; Chassaignac, Chase (June 1915). "Dr. Theodore J, Dimitry Has Been appointed Oculist for the New Orleans Public Schools". New Orleans Medical and Surgical Journal. 67 (12). New Orleans, Louisiana.
- De Buys, L.R. (April 1918). "Recommendations to the Louisiana State Medical Society". New Orleans Medical and Surgical Journal. 70 (10). New Orleans, Louisiana.
- Hedrich, A.W. (November 1919). "List of New Members". American Journal of Public Health. 9 (11). Boston, MA.
- Thomas, Mark (September 10, 2023). "Early 20th Century Ophthalmoscopy Tool". London, UK: Science Photo Library. Archived from the original on September 3, 2023.
- Sebastian, Anton (2018). A Dictionary of the History of Medicine. New York, NY: CRC Press. ISBN 9781351469999.
- Chassaignac, Charles (January 1921). "The Ophthalmological and Otolaryngological Club of Orleans Parish Medical Society". New Orleans Medical and Surgical Journal. 73 (7). New Orleans, Louisiana.
