= Thomas Dabney Dimitry =

Creole U.S. Postal Superintendent

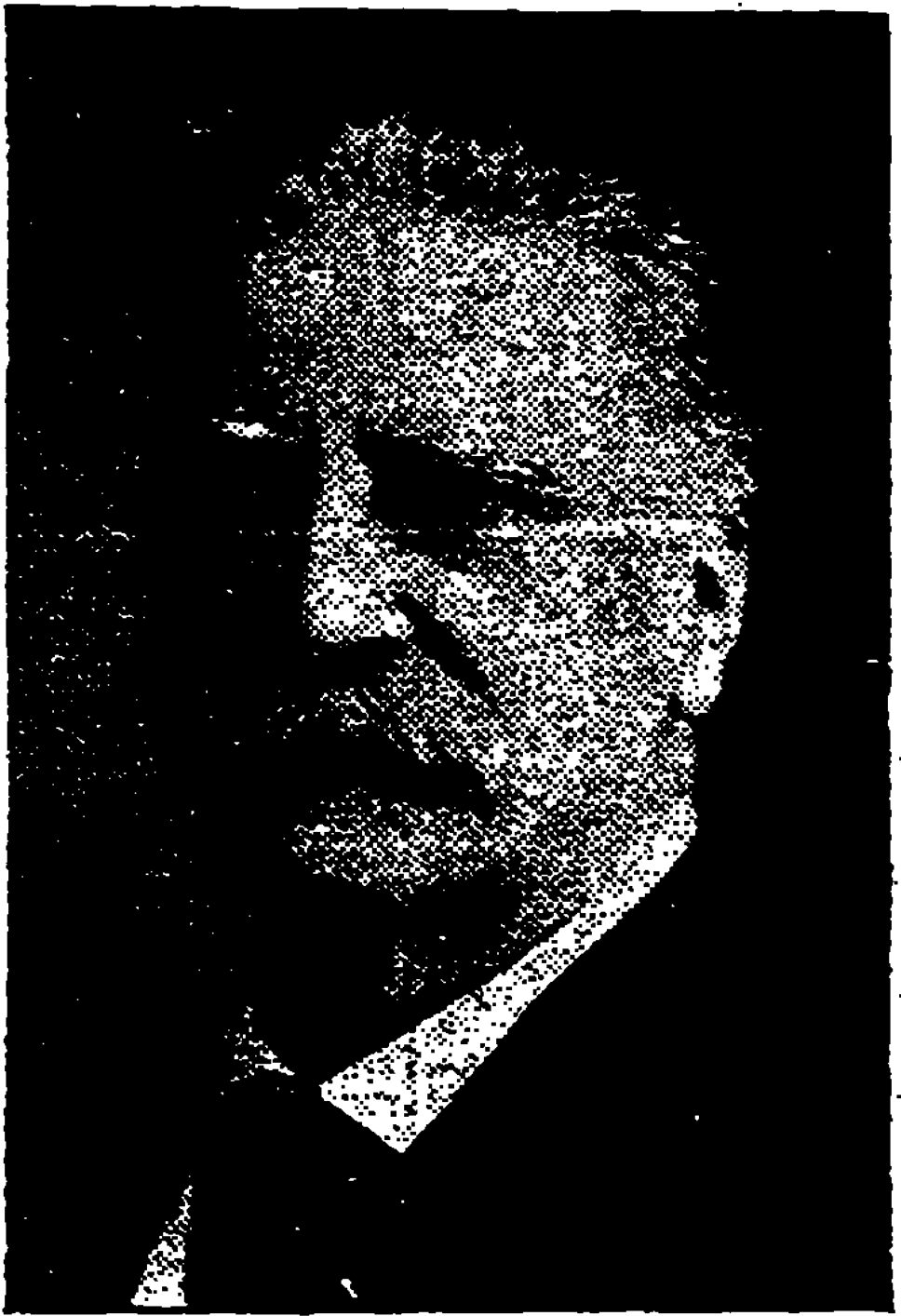
- Born: March 11, 1850; New Orleans, LA
- Died: November 3, 1936 (aged 86); New Orleans, LA
- Resting place: St. Louis Cemetery 1
- Occupation: Superintendent Postal Station C
- Years active: 1881-1930
- Employer(s): United States Custom House; U.S. Post Office
- Spouse(s): Anne Therese Snee (1882-1913), Maria Manuela Jacobsen (m. 1916)
- Children: Thomas Dabney Dimitry Jr.
- Parents: Alexander Dimitry (father); Mary Powell Mills (mother)
- Relatives: Marianne Celeste Dragon; Michel Dragon; Elizabeth Virginia Dimitry Ruth
- Family: Dimitry Family (Creoles)

Thomas Dabney Dimitry (March 11, 1850 - November 3, 1936) was a mixed-race clerk, superintendent, and secretary. He was the son of Alexander Dimitry and Mary Powell Mills, an interracial couple. Throughout his life, Alexander endured countless instances of racism along with the Dimitry Family. The Dimitry Family passed as white to escape racial hardships. Alexander, was the first person of color to function as the principal clerk for the Southwest Postal Department in Washington, D.C in 1835, a position he held for four years, and he was one of the few people of color to hold a government position in the Confederate Government as chief clerk to the postmaster general and later assistant postmaster general of the Confederacy.

His son Thomas, was one of the first mixed-race Creole post office superintendents in the largest post office in New Orleans. Thomas spent most of his life serving the U.S Postal Service, performing many duties. He was a stamp clerk for sixteen years. For ten years, he was a money order issuing clerk and then became superintendent of the money order department. Thomas was also the assistant superintendent of mail and superintendent of postal station C. He served as secretary and member of the Postal Board of the U. S. Civil Service Examiners. Thomas's second wife was a Cuban woman named Maria Manuela Jacobsen, who was the sister of Dr. Joaquin Jacobsen.

Thomas was born in New Orleans, Louisiana, in 1850. He was a member of a prominent Creole family known as the Dimitry family. His uncle John Baptiste Michael Dracos Dimitry and his father both attended Georgetown University and were educators. By the American Civil War, most of the Dimitry family served the Confederacy. As a teenager, Thomas was a congressional page in the Confederate Congress. By the 1870s, he served the Federal Government as a clerk and eventually worked at the custom house before joining the United States Postal Service from 1881 until 1920. He served the post office for over 39 years, which was remarkable due to his ethnic background because during the Jim Crow era, laws became more severe, including segregation, and eventually the one-drop rule was adopted in Louisiana by 1910. Thomas died at eighty-six years old.

== Biography ==
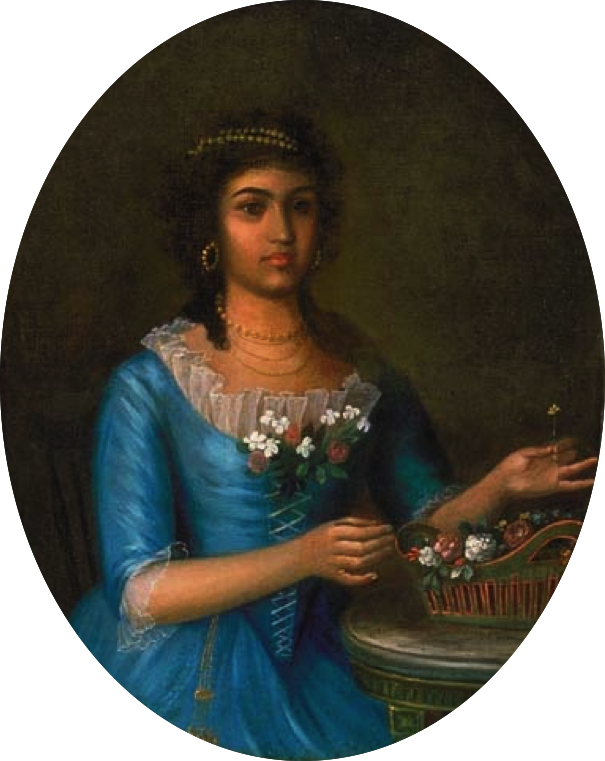
Thomas's grandmother Marianne Celeste Dragon

Thomas Dabney Dimitry was born in the Crescent City of New Orleans to diplomat Alexander Dimitry and Mary Powell Mills, daughter of prominent architect Robert Mills in 1850. They were a mixed-race couple. During this period, Thomas's father was an educator in New Orleans and had just finished serving as the first Louisiana Superintendent of Public Education. He was the first person of color to hold that position. Most of the family were educators. Due to abusive racism and the disqualification of interracial marriages in the late 1700s and early 1800s in New Orleans, Thomas's grandmother Marianne Céleste Dragon passed as a white person on public records. Several legal incidents almost identified her as a person of color, which would destabilize her legal status. The cases were Forstall, f.p.c. v. Dimitry (1833) and Pandelly v. Wiltz (1854).

The first incident occurred in the 1830s with the Forstall sisters, Pauline and Josephine. Property was given to Marianne by the Forstall family, and Pauline and Josephine sued to have the property returned. The Forstall sisters claimed she was pretending to be white, and the property was left to a woman of color. The white Marianne had to return the property. The court sided with Marianne allowing her to keep her property and her white status, ruling that the family had been in possession of the right to be categorized as a person not born of Negro extraction.

The second incident occurred when Thomas was around 3 years old in 1853; his first cousin George Pandely was running for a seat on the Board of Assistant Aldermen. The assistant aldermen was responsible for urban infrastructure in New Orleans, including streets and sidewalks a seat similar to a city council member. He was elected but forced to resign about seven months later because Victor Wiltz accused him of being of African lineage. It was against the law for people of African descent to hold public office.

Pandelly took Victor Wiltz to court in the case Pandelly v. Wiltz (1854), in the case George's opponent accused George's grandmother of having African ancestry to discredit his elected position. Pandelly took his opponent to court for slander. Pandelly won the case, but no damages were awarded, and the Pandely Affair inspired later generations to create a new genealogy where they claimed descent from a mythical, Indian princess of the Alibamu tribe named Malanta Talla. New Orleans records indicate both their grandmother and great-grandmother were not of Indian descent. Their great-grandmother was a former slave named Marie Françoise Chauvin Beaulieu de Montplaisir. She belonged to Mr. Charles Daprémont de La Lande, a member of the Superior Council.

Thomas's grandmother, Marianne, died when he was six years old. He grew up in a racially turbulent environment. When he was a teenager, the American Civil War started, and most of his family sided with the Confederacy. His father, Alexander, was one of the few people of color to hold a government position in the Confederate Government as chief clerk to the postmaster general and later assistant postmaster general of the Confederacy, Richmond, Virginia. His older brother, John Bull Smith Dimitry, assisted Alexander in the postmaster's office, and Charles Patton Dimitry was a writer. All of Alexander's children were close to him, except his one son, Alexander Godgrand Dimitry, who died in battle. Thomas served as a page in the Confederate Congress. The congressional page assisted with various tasks, including delivering documents, preparing the chamber for congressional sessions, and providing support during debates.

After the Civil War, Thomas served as clerk of registration of the First Ward of the Parish of Orleans. He served under Registrar Brainard Prince Blanchard for two terms, one in 1872 and a second term in 1878. Thomas served for the Federal Government until the withdrawal of the troops from the district as a Federal Government clerk in the United States Commissary beginning 1874, serving under General Thomas Crook Sullivan and later Colonel Andrew J. McGonnigle, assistant quarter master. Thomas became an assistant U.S. weigher in the New Orleans Custom House in 1877. He was then transferred to the inspector's department and later became a utility clerk.

Thomas joined the New Orleans Post Office in 1881. He was married one year later to Anne Therese Snee, a woman from Bayou Goula, Louisiana. The couple had seven children: Mrs. Will R. Britton, Mrs. R. Mills Evans, Alexander Dimitry, Thomas Dabney Dimitry Jr., Joseph A. Dimitry, John R. Dimitry, and Robert M. Dimitry. He continued to work at the post office until October 1920. Thomas followed in his father's footsteps because Alexander was principal clerk for the Southwest Postal Department in Washington, D.C, in 1835, a position he held for four years. And during the Civil War, Alexander served as chief clerk to the postmaster general and later assistant postmaster general of the Confederacy.

At the post office, Thomas served as a stamp clerk for sixteen years. For ten years, he was a money order issuing clerk and then superintendent of the money order department. Thomas was also the assistant superintendent of mail and was one of the first mixed-race Creole superintendents of postal station C. Thomas also served as the secretary and member of the Postal Board of the U. S. Civil Service Examiners. During his tenure, one of his relatives, Alexander J. Dimitry, a clerk in Station C, was charged with stealing mail while using cocaine, morphine, and alcohol; he was eventually found not guilty. In 1913, his first wife, Anne Therese Dimitry, died when he was sixty-three years old. Three years later, in 1916, he married a Cuban woman named Maria Manuela Jacobsen. He died twenty years later in 1936.

== Latin America ==
Thomas's father, Alexander, was the first person of color to serve as United States Ambassador to Costa Rica and Nicaragua. Throughout his life, he showed an interest in Latin American countries and wrote several articles about Cuba, and attended a free Cuba rally in 1873. His son John Bull Smith Dimitry moved to Colombia and lived in the country for several years, attempting to become the ambassador to the United States for Colombia. Alexander's nephew Ernest Lagarde was promoted to become the ambassador to San Salvador one year before his death. Ernest's son, Ernest Lagarde Jr,. became associated with Jamaica and served on the Panama Canal Commission. Thomas married a prominent woman from Cuba named Maria Manuela Jacobsen. She was his second wife and the sister of Dr. Joaquin Jacobsen, who spent a lifelong journey fighting tuberculosis.

== Bibliography ==
- Kendall, John Smith (1922). History of New Orleans Volume 3. Chicago And New York: The Lewis Publishing Company.
- Pecquet du Bellet, Louise (1907a). Some Prominent Virginia Families. Vol. 4. Lynchburg,VA: J. P. Bell Company (Incorporated).
- Pecquet du Bellet, Louise (1907). Some Prominent Virginia Families. Vol. 3. Lynchburg,VA: J. P. Bell Company Incorporated.
- Foretia, Crystal (April 5, 2023). The Color of Intimacy: Marriage, Passing, and the Legal Strategies of Afro-Creole Women in Antebellum New Orleans (PDF) (Thesis). New York, New York: Columbia University Department of History. Archived from the original (PDF) on July 9, 2023.
- Herringshaw, Thomas William, ed. (1901). "Charles Patton Dimitry". Herringshaw's Encyclopedia of American Biography of the Nineteenth Century. Chicago, IL: American Publishers Association.
- Christophe, Landry (August 18, 2018). "Mixed Marriages In Louisiana Creole Families 164 marriages" (PDF). Louisiana Historic & Cultural Vistas. Archived (PDF) from the original on February 9, 2023.
- Maddox, Joseph H. (August 4, 1853a). "Evidence of Lineage The Pandelly Affair". New Orleans Daily Crescent, Volume 6, No. 129. New Orleans, Louisiana: New Orleans Daily Crescent. p. 3, col. 2. Archived (PDF) from the original on August 25, 2023. "The Pandelly Affair"
- Thompson, Shirley Elizabeth (2009). Exiles at Home The Struggle to Become American in Creole New Orleans. Cambridge, MA: Harvard University Press. ISBN 9780674023512.
- Tucker, Susan (2016). City of Remembering: A History of Genealogy in New Orleans. Jackson, MI: University Press of Mississippi. ISBN 9781496806222.
- Chambers, William (1854). Things as They are in America. Philadelphia, PA: Lippincott, Grambo & Company.
- Horton, Hayward Derrick; Fasching-Varner, Kenneth J.; Martin, Lori Latrice, eds. (2016). After the Storm Militarization, Occupation, and Segregation in Post-Katrina America. New Orleans, LA: Bloomsbury. ISBN 9798216043737.
- Broyard, Bliss (2007). One Drop My Father's Hidden Life A Story of Race and Family Secrets. New York, New York: Little Brown and Company. ISBN 9780316019736.
- Kirkwood, Samuel J. (1881). Official Register of the United States, Vol. 2: Containing a List of the Officers and Employees in the Civil, Military, and Naval Service, On This Day First of July 1881 Volume II The Post Office Department and The Postal Service. Washington D.C.: Government Printing Office.
