= List of people from New Orleans =

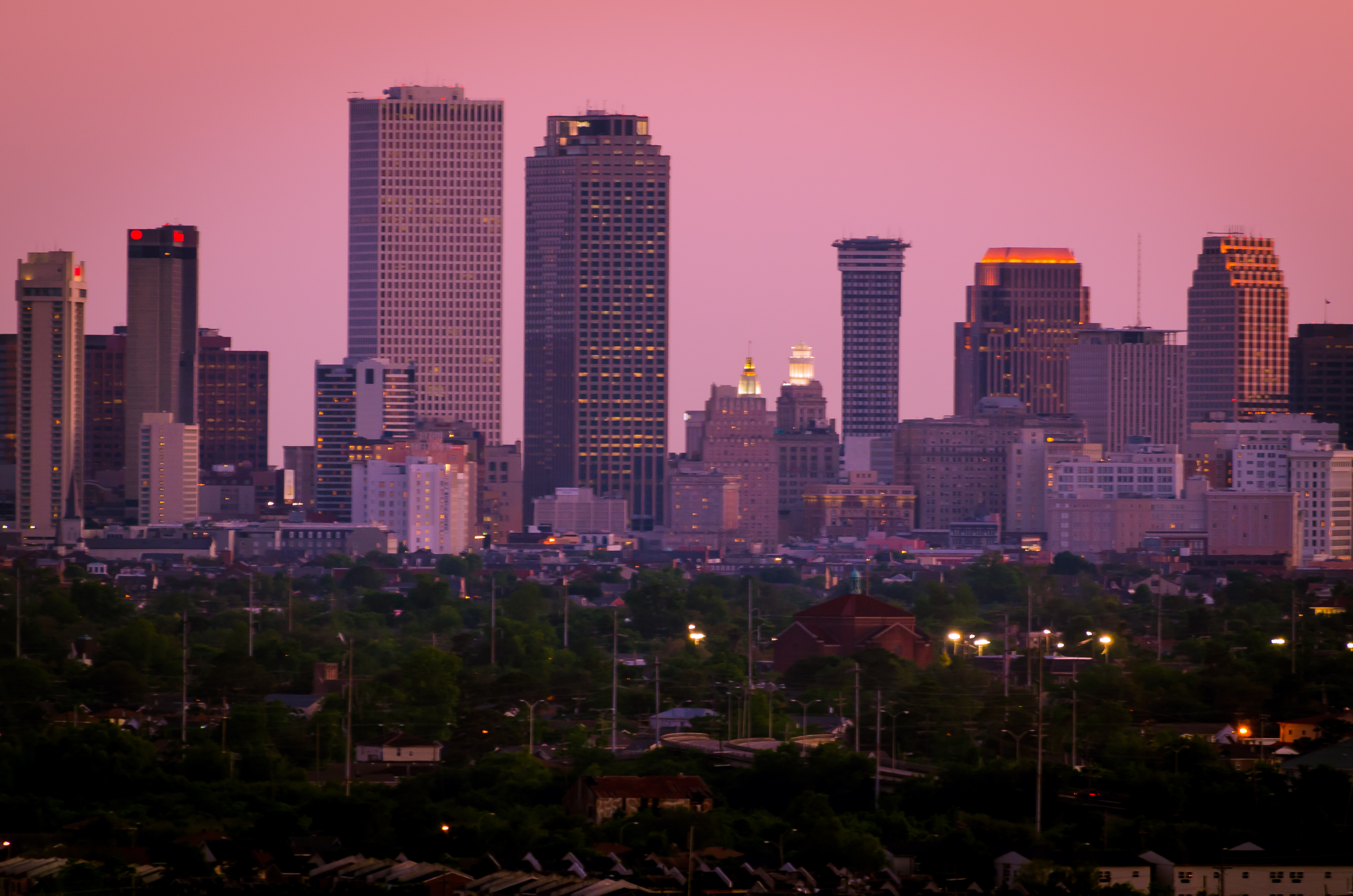
New Orleans skyline

This is a list of notable individuals who are or were natives, or notable as residents of, or in association with the American city of New Orleans, Louisiana.

== Academia ==
- Will W. Alexander, first president of Dillard University and head of the Commission on Interracial Cooperation
- Stephen Ambrose, historian and University of New Orleans professor
- William Balée, anthropologist and Tulane University professor
- Charles C. Bass, physician and researcher in tropical medicine and dental health
- Elizabeth Bass, physician, educator, and suffragist
- Stanhope Bayne-Jones, physician, member of US Surgeon General's Committee linking smoking to cancer
- Joan W. Bennett, biologist and former Tulane University professor
- Florence Borders, archivist and historian at the Amistad Research Center
- Cyril Y. Bowers, physician and endocrinology researcher
- Rick Brewer, president of Louisiana College since 2015; born in New Orleans in 1956
- Douglas Brinkley, historian, author and former University of New Orleans and Tulane University professor
- Brené Brown, professor of social work; author
- George E. Burch, pioneering physician, cardiovascular disease researcher, medical school professor
- John R. Conniff, educator and university administrator
- Scott Cowen, former president of Tulane University
- Richard Cusimano, historian and University of Louisiana at Lafayette distinguished professor
- Michael DeBakey, pioneer in heart surgery
- Albert W. Dent, president of Dillard University, chief executive of Flint-Goodridge Hospital
- James H. Dillard, educator, advocate for education of African-Americans
- John Duffy, medical historian
- Michael T. Dugan, educator and accounting scholar
- Joseph Ewan, botanist and biology professor
- Alcée Fortier, folklorist, historian, and university professor
- Mary L. Good, scientist and university professor
- Clifton H. Johnson, historian and founder of the Amistad Research Center
- Eamon Kelly, President of Tulane University
- Salman Khan, educator
- James A. Knight, psychiatrist, theologian, and medical ethicist
- Rudolph Matas, innovative surgeon at Tulane Medical School
- Gordon H. Mueller, historian and administrator at the University of New Orleans
- Ernest Lagarde literature and languages, professor and author
- Alton Ochsner, surgeon and medical researcher, founded the Ochsner Medical Center
- Max Rafferty, public school administrator and writer
- Andrew V. Schally, endocrinologist and Nobel Laureate
- Mary S. Sherman, cancer researcher and physician
- Royal D. Suttkus, biologist, founder of a major ichthyology collection
- Lewis Thomas, physician, researcher, and author of popular non-fiction
- Jeffrey Vitter, computer scientist and Purdue University dean
- Harold E. Vokes, zoologist and paleontologist

== Architecture ==
- Jean-Louis Dolliole, architect-builder who was a free person of color in the Antebellum era
- James Freret, architect, designed many 19th century homes in New Orleans
- William Alfred Freret, architect, supervising architect for federal building in the 19th century
- James Gallier Jr., architect, designed the French Opera House in New Orleans
- Moise H. Goldstein Sr., architect of extensive designs in the early 20th century
- Henry Howard, 19th century Irish-American architect
- Richard Koch, architectural preservationist and photographer
- Albert C. Ledner, 20th century architect
- Emile Weil, 20th century architect
- Leonard Spangenberg, 20th century architect
- Leon C. Weiss, architect commissioned by Huey P. Long
- Elizebeth Thomas Werlein, conservationist of the French Quarter of New Orleans

== Arts and literature ==
- Enrique Alferez, sculptor
- John James Audubon, painter, ornithologist, naturalist
- Vernel Bagneris, playwright, actor, director, singer, dancer
- Colette Bennet, writer, journalist, poet
- E. J. Bellocq, photographer
- Eloise Bibb Thompson, poet, fiction writer, and playwright
- Skip Bolen, photographer
- Roark Bradford, fiction writer
- Poppy Z. Brite, writer
- William S. Burroughs, writer
- George Washington Cable, writer
- Georgine Campbell, painter
- Truman Capote, writer
- John Churchill Chase, writer and cartoonist
- Kate Chopin, writer, feminist
- Marcus Bruce Christian, poet, folklorist and historian
- Ben Claassen III, illustrator and comics artist, DIRTFARM
- Margaret Clark, historian, writer, and educator
- Andrei Codrescu, poet and commentator
- Florestine Perrault Collins, photographer
- Alice Dalsheimer, poet
- Edgar Degas, artist
- Thomas Dent, poet and writer
- John Bull Smith Dimitry Creole author known for Le Tombeau Blanc
- George Washington Dixon, newspaper editor
- Alexander John Drysdale, artist
- Adolphe Duhart, writer and poet
- George Dureau, artist and photographer
- Caroline Durieux, artist and printmaker
- William Faulkner, writer
- Elissa Minet Fuchs, ballerina
- Daniel F. Galouye, science fiction writer
- Whitney Gaskell, writer, attended Tulane Law School which was the setting of her 2006 novel Testing Kate
- Rolland Golden, artist
- Shirley Ann Grau, writer
- Lafcadio Hearn, writer
- Knute Heldner, artist
- Lillian Hellman, writer
- George Herriman, Krazy Kat cartoonist
- Emma Churchman Hewitt, writer, journalist
- Walter Isaacson, writer, journalist, public policy analyst
- Charles Edward Kerbs, erotic artist and playwright
- Frances Parkinson Keyes, writer
- Grace King, writer
- Armand Lanusse, creole poet
- May Hyman Lesser, medical illustrator
- Dominique Lapierre, writer
- Elmore Leonard, author
- Michael Lewis, writer
- Shantrelle P. Lewis, curator
- Bunny Matthews, cartoonist
- Louis-Alphonse Maureau, painter
- Robert Bledsoe Mayfield, artist
- John McCrady, artist
- James Michalopoulos, artist
- Marie Madeleine Seebold Molinary, artist
- Gertrude Morgan, artist, musician, poet and preacher
- Sergio Rossetti Morosini, diplomat, painter, sculptor, filmmaker, naturalist
- Alice Dunbar Nelson, poet, journalist and political activist
- Isadora Newman, artist, poet, storyteller, sculptor
- David Ohle, writer
- Paul E. Poincy, artist
- Bart Ramsey, composer, author, singer and jazz musician
- Matthew Randazzo V, writer
- Anne Rice, writer of vampire tales and other Gothic fiction
- John T. Scott, artist and sculptor
- Kendall Shaw, abstract expressionist painter
- John Kennedy Toole, writer of A Confederacy of Dunces
- Sean Tuohy, sports commentator and restauranter
- Alexandrea Weis, author
- Lucille Western, actress
- Chris Wiltz, novelist
- William Woodward, painter

== Business and economics ==
- Frank Abadie, businessman and horse race promoter.
- Micaela Almonester, 19th-century businesswoman and real estate developer
- Tom Benson, owner of the New Orleans Saints
- George Bissell, entrepreneur, founded the first oil company in the United States
- Nathaniel L. Carpenter, businessman
- Isaac Delgado, businessman and philanthropist, benefactor of Delgado Community College
- Constant C. Dejoie Sr., business leader
- William C. Edenborn, railroad magnate, industrialist and inventor
- Charles E. Fenner, businessperson, co-founder of Fenner & Beane, a forerunner of Merrill Lynch
- Ruth Fertel, businesswoman, Ruth's Chris Steakhouse
- Avram Glazer, businessman and sports franchise owner
- Leon Godchaux, businessman and sugar merchant
- George A. Hero, entrepreneur known locally as the "Drainage King"
- Daniel Henry Holmes, 19th-century businessman
- Victor Kiam, entrepreneur
- Yvonne LaFleur, fashion designer, businesswoman
- Thomy Lafon, businessman, human rights activist
- Prosper Lamal, entrepreneur who started the usage of blue street tiles in New Orleans
- John McDonogh (1779–1850), shipping, land speculation (world's largest private landholder ca. 1850), philanthropist and namesake of many New Orleans schools
- Alexander Milne, 18th-century businessman and entrepreneur
- Oliver Pollock, merchant, financier of the American Revolutionary War
- Benjamin M. Rosen, computer entrepreneur
- John G. Schwegmann, supermarket innovator
- Clay Shaw, businessman
- Edgar B. Stern Sr, businessperson and philanthropist
- Patrick F. Taylor, businessperson and philanthropist
- Judah Touro, businessman and philanthropist
- Martin de Villamil or Martin Villamil (1783–1843), businessman
- Philip P. Werlein, music publisher and retailer
- Samuel Zemurray, businessman and philanthropist

== Cuisine ==
- Edward Baquet, restaurateur and civil rights activist
- Owen Brennan, restaurateur
- Leah Chase, chef
- Al Copeland, restaurateur, Popeyes Chicken & Biscuits and Copeland's restaurants
- Ruth Fertel, restaurateur, Ruth's Chris Steak House
- Beulah Levy Ledner, pastry chef
- Austin Leslie, chef

== Crime ==
- Axeman of New Orleans, mysterious mass murderer
- Sylvestro Carolla, mafia boss
- Wilson Chouest, serial rapist and killer of two women in California
- Antoinette Frank, former police officer and triple-murderer
- Ivory Harris, drug trafficker and weapons trafficker
- Mary Jane Jackson, mid-19th century serial killer
- Jean Lafitte, pirate and brother of Pierre Lafitte
- Pierre Lafitte, pirate and brother of Jean Lafitte
- Delphine LaLaurie, socialite and sadist
- Carlos Marcello, businessman and mafia boss
- Lee Harvey Oswald, assassinated John F. Kennedy

== Fictional ==
- Mr. Bingle, snowman that assisted Santa Claus and worked at Maison Blanche Department Store
- Benjamin Button, man who is born old and grows young, in a film loosely adapted from an F. Scott Fitzgerald short story
- Louis de Pointe du Lac, vampire appearing in Anne Rice's The Vampire Chronicles
- Ignatius J. Reilly, hero of John Kennedy Toole's novel A Confederacy of Dunces (1980)
- Seymore D. Fair, 1984 Louisiana World Exposition Mascot, celebrity cartoon character, advocate for animal, people, and planet welfare
- Gambit, Marvel Comics superhero (X-Men)
- Marcel Gerard, vampire appearing in Julie Plec's The Originals
- Hazel Levesque, previous residence before moving and first death, appearing in Heroes of Olympus by Rick Riordan
- Morgus the Magnificent, mad scientist and horror movie host
- Dwayne Cassius "King" Pride, NCIS Supervisory Agent, NCIS: New Orleans
- Benjamin Sisko, Starfleet captain (Star Trek: Deep Space Nine)
- Princess Tiana, heroine of Disney's animated film The Princess and the Frog
- Alastor, sinner demon and one of the Overlords of Hell in the adult-animated musical series Hazbin Hotel

== Film, television and entertainment ==
- Raymond Arroyo, director
- Yahya Abdul-Mateen II, actor
- Bryan Batt, actor
- Sandra Bullock, actress
- Kitty Carlisle, entertainer
- Paul Carr, actor
- John Carroll, actor and singer
- Laura Cayouette, actor and author
- Hong Chau, actress
- Patricia Clarkson, actress
- Marshall Colt, psychologist and former actor
- Frank Joseph Davis, television journalist and cookbook author
- Bianca Del Rio, drag queen and comedian
- Ellen DeGeneres, comedian and talk show host
- Vance DeGeneres, actor, screenwriter and musician
- Raquel "Rocsi" Diaz, television host
- Faith Domergue, actress
- Donna Douglas, actress
- Jean Baptiste Le Sueur Fontaine, actor, theatre director and newspaper editor
- Allison Harvard, runner-up of the twelfth cycle of America's Next Top Model
- Barry Shabaka Henley, actor
- Dwight Henry, actor
- Gloria Henry, actress
- Cheryl Holdridge, actress
- Indigo, actress
- Eddie Jemison, actor
- Bayn Johnson, former child actress and singer
- Leatrice Joy, actress
- Dorothy Lamour, actress
- Katherine LaNasa, actress
- John Larroquette, actor
- Sabrina LeBeauf, actress
- Anthony Mackie, actor
- Cooper Manning, entrepreneur and television personality
- Evan Mather, director
- Tristin Mays, actress
- Adah Isaacs Menken, actress
- Taylor Miller, actress
- Garrett Morris, comedian and actor
- Ed Nelson, actor
- Mark Normand, stand-up comedian
- Chris Owens, burlesque performer and entrepreneur
- Pauley Perrette, actress
- Tyler Perry, actor, filmwriter, and director
- Wendell Pierce, actor,
- Godfrey Reggio, experimental filmmaker and documentarian
- Stassi Schroeder, television personality, model and author
- Al Shea, actor and theatre critic
- Neferteri Shepherd, model and actress
- Sydney Shields, stage actress
- Richard Simmons, fitness personality
- Harold Sylvester, actor
- Jay Thomas, actor
- Sam Trammell, actor
- Ben Turpin, silent film comedian
- Ray Walston, actor
- Carl Weathers, actor
- Walter Williams, comedian
- Tommy Wiseau, actor and director
- Cora Witherspoon, actress
- Reese Witherspoon, actress
- Grace Zabriskie, actress

== Journalism ==
- Jim Amoss, journalist and newspaper editor
- Dean Baquet, journalist and newspaper editor
- Jason Berry, investigative journalist and historian
- David Bernard, television meteorologist
- James Carville, Democratic Party political consultant and pundit
- Buddy Diliberto, sports journalist
- Charles Patton Dimitry Creole journalist, poet, and author known for The House in Balfour Street
- Dorothy Dix, journalist
- Christopher Drew, investigative reporter
- Charles L. "Pie" Dufour, newspaper columnist and historian
- Hap Glaudi, television sportscaster
- Victor Gold, journalist and political consultant, reared in New Orleans
- Bryant Gumbel, television anchor
- Greg Gumbel, television sportscaster
- Ira B. Harkey Jr., newspaper journalist, civil rights advocate
- Jim Henderson, television sportscaster
- Iris Kelso, journalist for three New Orleans newspapers and WDSU television commentator
- Hoda Kotb, television anchor
- Mel Leavitt, television journalist and historian
- Angus Lind, newspaper journalist
- Wayne Mack, television sportscaster
- John Maginnis, journalist, political commentator, and author of The Last Hayride, The Cross to Bear, and The Politics of Reform
- Ora Mae Lewis Martin, journalist
- Mary Matalin, Republican Party political consultant
- Bill Monroe, NBC television journalist
- Arthel Neville, television anchor
- Cokie Roberts, ABC television journalist and commentator for National Public Radio
- Nash Roberts, television meteorologist
- Garland Robinette, investigative journalist
- Louis Charles Roudanez, founder of The New Orleans Tribune newspaper
- Lyle Saxon, journalist
- Howard K. Smith, television anchorman
- Ronnie Virgets, writer and broadcast journalist

== Law, politics, and military ==
- Bryan Adams, former member of the Louisiana House of Representatives from Jefferson Parish since 2012; born in New Orleans.
- Reverend Avery Alexander, civil rights leader, state legislator
- Andres Almonaster y Rojas, Spanish civil servant in colonial New Orleans, also a philanthropist
- Jeff Arnold, former member of the Louisiana House for the Algiers section, 2002–2016
- John B. Babcock, Medal of Honor recipient
- Amy Coney Barrett, U.S. Supreme Court Justice and academic
- Jean J. Beaufort, Union Army corporal and Medal of Honor recipient in the Civil War
- P.G.T. Beauregard, Confederate general and inventor
- Clyde F. Bel Jr., businessman and state representative for Orleans Parish, 1964–1972 and 1975–1980
- Judah P. Benjamin, U.S. Senator, Confederate Attorney General, Secretary of War and Secretary of State
- David H. Berger, commandant of the United States Marine Corps
- Hale Boggs, former U.S. Representative
- Lindy Boggs, former U.S. Representative and retired U.S. Ambassador to The Vatican
- Thomas Hale Boggs Jr., lawyer/lobbyist in Washington, D.C., born in New Orleans in 1940, son of Hale and Lindy Boggs, brother of Cokie Roberts and Barbara Boggs Sigmund
- Stephen Bradberry, community organizer, Robert F. Kennedy Human Rights Award laureate
- Juan Davis Bradburn, freedom fighter for Mexico, officer in the Battle of New Orleans
- Henry Braden, politician
- Elward Thomas Brady Jr., state representative from Terrebonne Parish 1972–1976, born in New Orleans
- Donna Brazile, political strategist
- Jared Brossett, member of the New Orleans City Council since 2014; state representative for District 97, 2009–2014
- J. Marshall Brown, insurance agent and politician
- William G. Brown (1832–1883), Louisiana state superintendent of education, 1872–1876
- Benjamin F. Butler, administrator of Union-occupied New Orleans during the Civil War
- John A. Butler, U.S. Marine Corps officer and Navy Cross recipient
- Pascal F. Calogero Jr., Chief Justice Louisiana Supreme Court
- Gary Carter Jr., member of the Louisiana House from the Algiers neighborhood, effective 2016
- Troy Carter, U.S. representative for Louisiana
- James Carville, political consultant, political science professor
- Marlon Coleman, Mayor of Muskogee, Oklahoma
- Harry Connick Sr., district attorney, father of singer Harry Connick Jr.
- A.G. Crowe, politician
- Milton Joseph Cunningham, attorney, state legislator, state attorney general for three nonconsecutive terms ending in 1900
- John Craft, Alabama state sentator.
- Bernard de Marigny, politician and land developer
- Étienne de Boré, first Mayor of New Orleans in the U.S. administration
- James D. Denegre, Minnesota state senator and lawyer
- Rodolphe Desdunes, Creole poet and civil rights activist
- Jean Noel Destréhan, early Creole politician and plantation owner
- Alexander Dimitry, First Person of Color to become U.S. Ambassador of Costa Rica and Nicaragua, 1859 – 1861
- Andrea Dimitry fought in the Battle of New Orleans during the War of 1812 with Andrew Jackson
- Michel Dragon Lieutenant American Revolutionary War
- David Duke, state representative for Metairie 1989–1992; White nationalist
- Oscar Dunn, first African-American governor of a U.S. state
- H. Garland Dupré, attorney and politician; Speaker of the Louisiana House 1908–1910; U.S. representative from Louisiana's 2nd congressional district, 1910–1924
- Frank Burton Ellis, attorney, politician, federal judge
- Albert Estopinal, former U.S. representative and member of both houses of the Louisiana State Legislature
- Olaf Fink, member of the Louisiana State Senate 1956–1972; New Orleans educator
- C.B. Forgotston, attorney, political activist, state government watchdog
- Henry L. Fuqua, governor who defeated Huey Long in an election
- Randal Gaines, state representative since 2012 for St. Charles and St. John the Baptist parishes; former assistant city attorney in New Orleans
- Jim Garrison, district attorney of Orleans Parish
- Robert T. Garrity Jr., attorney and former state representative for Jefferson Parish
- Charles Gayarré, state legislator noted for his histories of Louisiana
- Newt Gingrich, U.S. Congressman from Georgia, Speaker of the U.S. House of Representatives
- Nicholas Girod, early mayor of New Orleans
- Al Green, U.S. representative for Texas
- John Grenier, Birmingham lawyer and Alabama Republican Party figure, born in New Orleans in 1930
- Brenda Hatfield, former Chief Administrative Officer of the City of New Orleans
- F. Edward Hebert, Democrat U.S. Representative for Louisiana's 1st congressional district, 1941–1977
- Cynthia Hedge-Morrell, former member of the New Orleans City Council for District D, 2005–2014
- Frederick Jacob Reagan Heebe, former judge of the United States District Court for the Eastern District of Louisiana
- David Heitmeier, state senator for District 7 since 2008, optometrist
- Francis C. Heitmeier, state senator for District 7, 1988–2008; businessman and lobbyist
- David Hennessy, police chief, assassinated in 1890
- Clay Higgins, Republican member of the United States House of Representatives for Louisiana's 3rd congressional district; born in New Orleans in 1961
- Stephanie Hilferty, Republican state representative for Orleans and Jefferson parishes, effective January 2016
- Walker Hines, former state representative
- Jean Joseph Amable Humbert, army general, subordinate to Andrew Jackson at the Battle of New Orleans
- Bernette Joshua Johnson, Chief Justice of the Louisiana Supreme Court since 2013; associate justice, 1994–2013, native and resident of New Orleans
- Jeannette Knoll, associate justice of the Louisiana Supreme Court; reared and educated in New Orleans, where the court meets; resides in Marksville
- Mary Landrieu, state representative, state treasurer, U.S. senator
- Mitch Landrieu, state representative, lieutenant governor, former mayor of New Orleans
- Moon Landrieu, judge and politician, mayor of New Orleans
- Hank Lauricella, former professional football player; state senator from Jefferson Parish, 1972–1996
- Bob Livingston, Republican former U.S. Representative for 1st congressional district
- Edward Livingston, drafted Louisiana Civil Code
- Lt. Gen. James Longstreet, Confederate general
- Joseph Mansion, Louisiana state legislator, state tax assessor
- Bessie Margolin, labor lawyer
- Danny Martiny, state senator from Jefferson Parish, born in New Orleans
- Harold A. Moise, state representative for the 12th Ward, Orleans civil court judge 1937–1948, and associate justice of the Louisiana Supreme Court 1948–1958
- Ernest Nathan Morial, American political, legal, and civil rights leader
- Marc Morial, former mayor, son of Ernest Nathan Morial
- deLesseps Story Morrison, former mayor and ambassador to the Organization of American States
- deLesseps Morrison Jr., late state representative
- William Mumford, Confederate resistor in Union-occupied New Orleans during the Civil War
- Ray Nagin, former mayor of New Orleans
- Michael H. O'Keefe, president of the Louisiana State Senate 1976–1983; convicted felon
- Alejandro O'Reilly, governor of Louisiana, known as "Bloody O'Reilly"
- George Pandely New Orleans Assistant Alderman known for the Pandelly Affair
- Leander Perez, district judge, district attorney, and president of the Plaquemines Parish Commission Council
- P.B.S. Pinchback, politician
- James Pitot, third mayor of New Orleans
- Loulan Pitre Jr., New Orleans lawyer and former state representative for Lafourche Parish
- Edward Joseph Price, state representative for District 58, Gonzales businessman, and former resident of New Orleans
- William P. Quigley, activist attorney and academic
- Max Rafferty, educator author and columnist, California politician, born in New Orleans in 1917
- Cokie Roberts, journalist, daughter of Hale and Lindy Boggs
- Steve Scalise, House Minority Whip and U.S. Representative of Louisiana's 1st district
- Tom Schedler, former state senator from St. Tammany Parish and current Louisiana secretary of state
- Pat Screen, Louisiana State University quarterback, lawyer, and former Mayor-President of East Baton Rouge Parish
- Ronal W. Serpas, Superintendent of the New Orleans Police Department since 2010
- Joseph A. Shakspeare, Mayor of New Orleans at the time of the March 14, 1891 lynchings
- Eric Skrmetta, attorney from Metairie, Louisiana; Republican member of the Louisiana Public Service Commission for District 1
- Jefferson B. Snyder, lived in New Orleans 1893–1897; later district attorney in three delta parishes in northeast Louisiana 1904–1948
- James Z. Spearing, attorney, school board member, U.S. representative from Louisiana's 2nd congressional district, 1924–1931
- Dorothy Mae Taylor, first African-American woman to serve in the Louisiana House, 1971–1980; member of the New Orleans City Council, 1986–1994
- Charles Laveau Trudeau, early 19th century mayor of New Orleans
- A.P. Tureaud, attorney
- Jorge Ubico, exiled president of Guatemala
- José de Villamil (or José Villamil), father of the independence of Ecuador
- David Vitter, U.S. Senator, 2005–2017
- John Volz, late U.S. attorney for the Eastern District of Louisiana
- Alexander F. Warley, Confederate States Navy officer
- Chatham Roberdeau Wheat, leader of the Louisiana Tigers during the US Civil War
- Edward Douglass White, Chief Justice of the United States Supreme Court
- John C. White, Louisiana education superintendent since 2012; superintendent of the Recovery School District in New Orleans, 2011
- Robert Wilkie, National Security Assistant to the President
- John Williams, Union Navy sailor awarded the Medal of Honor during the Civil War.
- Clint Williamson, U.S. Ambassador, White House policy official, United Nations envoy
- John Minor Wisdom, judge of the United States Court of Appeals for the Fifth Circuit
- Andrew Young, politician

== Math, science, and invention ==
- Ruth Benerito, inventor of wrinkle-free cotton
- Alfred H. Clifford, mathematician
- Isaac Cline, meteorologist and writer
- Theodore John Dimitry Jr. optometrist known for developing the Dimitry Erisiphake and the Plastic Eye
- Bennet Dowler, medical scientist
- Andrew Higgins, ship builder and inventor
- Emile Lamm, inventor
- Theodore K. Lawless, dermatologist, medical researcher, and philanthropist
- Jean Alexandre LeMat, inventor
- Abraham Louis Levin, physician and inventor of the Levin Tube
- Levi Spear Parmley, inventor of dental floss
- Mark Plotkin, ethnobotanist
- John Leonard Riddell, inventor of the binocular microscope
- Norbert Rilleaux, inventor, engineer
- Ken Thompson, co-creator of the Unix operating system, C (programming language) and Go (programming language) and Turing Award recipient
- A. Baldwin Wood, inventor and engineer
- Angie Jones, software engineer, automation architect

== Music ==
- August Alsina, singer/songwriter
- Phil Anselmo, musician
- Louis Armstrong, musician and entertainer
- B.G., rapper
- Baby Boy Da Prince, rapper
- Achille Baquet, musician
- George Baquet, musician
- Paul Barbarin, musician and composer
- Pat Barberot, band leader
- Danny Barker, musician, vocalist, and writer
- Dave Bartholomew, musician, composer, promoter
- Jon Batiste, singer, composer, pianist, jazz musician
- Sidney Bechet, musician
- Annabelle Bernard, operatic soprano
- Better Than Ezra, rock group
- Birdman aka Baby, rapper, producer
- Big Freedia, bounce artist
- Terence Blanchard, musician and composer
- Peter Bocage, Jazz trumpeter and violinist
- Buddy Bolden, musician, early jazz figure
- Sharkey Bonano, Jazz musician
- James Booker, musician
- Larry Borenstein, founder of Preservation Hall
- Connee Boswell, singer, member of the Boswell Sisters singing group
- Helvetia "Vet" Boswell, singer, member of the Boswell Sisters singing group
- Martha Boswell, singer, member of the Boswell Sisters singing group
- Pud Brown, jazz musician
- George Brunis, jazz trombonist
- Collie Buddz, reggae/dancehall artist
- C-Murder, rapper
- Cane Hill, nu-metal group
- Paul Caporino, songwriter, musician, lead singer of M.O.T.O.
- Big Al Carson, blues singer
- Kiki Cavazos, folk singer and songwriter
- Eugene Chassaignac, musician, composer, advocate for people of color
- Alex Chilton, songwriter, guitarist, music producer, lead singer of the Box Tops and Big Star
- Choppa, rapper
- Merry Clayton, singer
- Jon Cleary, funk and R&B musician
- Lee Collins, jazz trumpeter
- Harry Connick Jr., musician and entertainer
- Cowboy Mouth, band
- Barry Cowsill, musician
- Paul Crawford, jazz musician, music historian
- Curren$y, rapper
- Edmond Dede, musician, composer
- Fernando del Valle, operatic tenor
- DJ Khaled, DJ
- Dr. John, musician
- Johnny Dodds, jazz clarinetist and saxophonist
- Fats Domino, musician
- Lee Dorsey, singer
- Down, metal band
- Tom Drummond, bassist of Better Than Ezra
- Champion Jack Dupree, pianist, singer
- Frankie Dusen, jazz trombonist
- Ernie K-Doe, singer, "Emperor of the Universe"
- Lars Edegran, bandleader
- Lionel Ferbos, jazz musician
- Lucky Daye, singer, songwriter, musician, performer
- Giuseppe Ferrata, composer, pianist, and university professor
- Frankie Ford, singer, entertainer
- Pops Foster, jazz musician
- Vernel Fournier, jazz drummer
- Pete Fountain, musician, clarinet player, jazz, pop, and swing
- Mannie Fresh, DJ, producer, rapper
- Frank Froeba, musician, jazz, pianist, band leader
- The Funky Meters, musicians and singers
- Mary Gauthier, singer and songwriter
- George Girard, musician
- Victor Goines, jazz musician, dean of jazz at the Juilliard School
- Louis Moreau Gottschalk, pianist and composer
- Kevin Griffin, musician, lead singer for Better than Ezra
- Gudda Gudda, rapper
- Donald Harrison, musician
- Clarence "Frogman" Henry, singer and musician
- Al Hirt, musician, trumpet, jazz, pop, and swing
- Cha Cha Hogan, comedian, musician, entertainer
- Moses Hogan, musician, composer
- Linda Hopkins, blues and gospel singer
- Noah Howard, jazz musician
- Imagination Movers, children's band
- Armand "Jump" Jackson, blues drummer and bandleader
- Mahalia Jackson, gospel singer
- Pervis Jackson, rhythm & blues singer member of The Spinners
- Luke James, R&B singer, actor
- Jay Electronica, rapper and producer
- N.O. Joe, music producer, musician
- Little Sonny Jones, blues singer
- Juvenile, rapper
- Freddie Keppard, jazz cornetist
- Kid Ory, musician
- Kidd Kidd, rapper
- Earl King, musician
- Jean Knight, singer
- Papa Jack Laine, bandleader
- Nick LaRocca, early jazz figure
- Walter "Popee" Lastie, drummer
- Meghan Linsey, singer-songwriter, contestant from The Voice season 8
- Lil' Fizz, singer, rapper
- Lil Romeo, rapper
- Lil Wayne, rapper
- Lloyd, singer
- Rico Love, singer/songwriter
- Mac, rapper
- Magic, rapper
- Magnolia Shorty, New Orleans bounce artist
- Mack Maine, rapper
- Dave Malone, songwriter, guitarist, music producer, guitarist and vocalist in The New Orleans Radiators
- Wingy Manone, jazz trumpeter, and singer
- Angélica María, Mexican singer-songwriter and entertainer, "La Novia de Mexico"
- Paul Mares, jazz musician
- Branford Marsalis, musician, alto, soprano, tenor, and baritone saxophones
- Ellis Marsalis Jr., musician and educator, piano
- Ellis Marsalis Sr., music patron, businessman and advocate
- Jason Marsalis, musician (drums, vibraphone)
- Wynton Marsalis, musician, trumpet, cornet, flumpet, flugelhorn
- Master P, rapper, businessman, and mogul
- Cosimo Matassa, music studio entrepreneur
- Jimmy Maxwell, bandleader
- Irvin Mayfield, musician
- The Medicine Men, producers, singers (Mo B. Dick and Odell), rappers (KLC and Mo B. Dick)
- The Meters, musicians and singers
- Lizzie Miles, singer
- Mr. Quintron, organist
- Deacon John Moore, musician and bandleader
- Jelly Roll Morton, musician and composer, early jazz figure
- Teedra Moses, R&B and soul singer-songwriter
- Mutemath, band
- Mystick Krewe of Clearlight
- Mystikal, rapper
- The Neville Brothers, musicians and singers
- Ivan Neville, phunk, R&B
- Randy Newman, musician
- Camille Nickerson, musician and composer
- Normani, born Normani Kordei Hamilton, singer
- Frank Ocean, singer
- Joe "King" Oliver, musician
- Lisette Oropesa, operatic soprano
- Jimmy Palao, musician, bandleader
- Earl Palmer, musician
- Robert Parker, musician and singer
- Partners-N-Crime, rap duo
- Nicholas Payton, musician
- Marguerite Piazza, operatic soprano
- Piggy D., bassist
- Genevieve Pitot, composer, musician, dancer
- George Porter Jr., musician
- Louis Prima, musician (trumpet), singer, bandleader, entertainer, aka "The King of the Swing"
- Professor Longhair, born Henry Byrd, pianist, singer
- The Radiators, rock band
- Mac Rebennack, "Dr. John"
- Rebirth Brass Band, band
- Trent Reznor, musician, producer
- Dawn Richard, former member of Danity Kane and Diddy-Dirty Money
- Rising Appalachia, world, folk, roots, and soul group
- Rob49, rapper
- Jason Ross, Seven Mary Three frontman
- Kermit Ruffins, jazz trumpeter, singer and composer
- Bill Russell, music historian and composer
- Marguerite Samuel, composer and pianist
- Paul Sanchez, singer-songwriter and guitarist
- Silkk the Shocker, rapper
- Bill Sinegal, bassist and songwriter
- Skull Duggery, rapper
- Soulja Slim, rapper
- Chloe Smith, singer-songwriter, multi-instrumentalist
- Leah Song, singer-songwriter, multi-instrumentalist
- Stooges Brass Band, New Orleans funk brass band
- $uicideboy$, rap duo
- Babe Stovall, blues singer and guitarist, "Mr. Bojangles"
- Supagroup, rock band
- Irma Thomas, rhythm and blues singer, aka "Soul Queen of New Orleans"
- Allen Toussaint, musician, composer, record producer
- Norman Treigle, operatic bass-baritone
- Trombone Shorty, born Troy Andrews, musician
- Turk, rapper
- Shirley Verrett, operatic mezzo-soprano and soprano
- George Wein, founder of the New Orleans Jazz & Heritage Festival
- Michael White, Jazz musician
- Charles "Hungry" Williams, Rhythm & Blues drummer
- Larry Williams, Rock 'n' Roll/R&B pianist
- "Scarface" John Williams, singer
- Spencer Williams, songwriter
- Kirk Windstein, musician
- Young V, rapper
- Linnzi Zaorski
- Zebra, band

== Religion ==
- Antonio de Sedella, early Roman Catholic leader in New Orleans
- Henriette DeLille, founder of the order of the Sisters of the Holy Family
- Jesse Duplantis, televangelist
- J. D. Grey, pastor, former president of the Southern Baptist Convention
- Marie-Madeleine Hachard, Ursuline abbess, documented early history of New Orleans
- W. T. Handy, Jr., United Methodist bishop
- Philip Hannan, former archbishop of New Orleans
- Francis L. Hawks, clergyman, first president of Tulane University
- Jerome LeDoux, Roman Catholic priest
- Joseph Francis Rummel, former archbishop of New Orleans
- Lory Schaff, member of the Sisters of St. Joseph who founded centers for adult literacy education
- Francis Xavier Seelos, missionary who ministered to victims of yellow fever epidemics
- John William Shaw, former archbishop of New Orleans

== Sports ==
- Ashley Ambrose, NFL player, Atlanta Falcons and New Orleans Saints, graduated from Alcee Fortier High School
- Nehemiah Atkinson, professional tennis player and coach
- D. J. Augustin, NBA player
- Amari Bailey (born 2004), NBA and Israeli Basketball Premier League basketball player
- Armand Blackmar, nineteenth century chess player and music publisher
- Walter Blattmann, Olympic gymnast
- Delvin Breaux, gridiron football player
- Stanley Brundy, basketball player
- Cethan Carter, football player
- Will Clark, former Major League Baseball player
- Landon Collins, NFL player for the New York Giants
- Tazzie Colomb, IFBB professional female bodybuilder and powerlifter
- Scott Cochran, special teams coordinator for the Georgia Bulldogs
- Ernie Danjean, former Green Bay Packers linebacker
- Orleans Darkwa, professional football player
- Tom Dempsey, former NFL kicker, held longest field goal record for over 43 years
- David Dixon, professional sports advocate for New Orleans Saints, Louisiana Superdome, USFL, World Championship Tennis
- Scott Dohmann, former MLB pitcher
- Corey Dowden, former NFL defensive back
- Clyde Drexler, former University of Houston and NBA star, member of Basketball Hall of Fame
- Marshall Faulk, professional football star (St. Louis Rams), member of Pro Football Hall of Fame
- Steve Foley, former defensive back for Denver Broncos
- Matt Forte, running back for Chicago Bears, New York Jets
- John Fourcade, former NFL and CFL quarterback, sports analyst
- De'Aaron Fox, NBA point guard
- J. P. France, MLB pitcher
- Nolan Franz, former Green Bay Packers wide receiver
- Leonard Fournette, NFL player, running back for the Tampa Bay Buccaneers
- Harry P. Gamble, football player, swimmer, gymnast, boxer, and attorney
- Eddie Garcia, former Green Bay Packers placekicker
- Larry Gilbert, Major League Baseball player
- Tookie Gilbert, Major League Baseball player
- Tad Gormley, athletic trainer, coach, and official
- Danny Granger, forward for NBA's Indiana Pacers, Miami Heat
- Cortez Hankton, former NFL player who is currently the passing game coordinator & wide receivers coach for the LSU Tigers
- Adrian Hardy, NFL player
- Chris Henry, former NFL wide receiver
- Roneeka Hodges, assistant coach for the Connecticut Sun and head coach for Phantom
- Chris Horton, former NFL safety
- Kevin Hughes, former NFL offensive tackle
- Tory James, former cornerback for Cincinnati Bengals
- Avery Johnson, former National Basketball Association player, former coach of Dallas Mavericks
- Deion Jones, NFL linebacker for the Atlanta Falcons
- Junkyard Dog, stage name of Sylvester Ritter, former professional wrestler
- Robert Kelley, Washington Redskins running back
- Kerry Kittles, former NBA player for New Jersey Nets
- Dominik Koepfer, professional tennis player
- Lester Lautenschlaeger, football player, politician, first director of New Orleans Recreation Department
- Kendrick Lewis, NFL free safety, played for Kansas City Chiefs and Baltimore Ravens, attended Ole Miss
- Michael Lewis, former New Orleans Saints wide receiver
- Rydell Malancon, former NFL linebacker
- Archie Manning, former New Orleans Saints quarterback, father of Peyton and Eli and Cooper
- Eli Manning, former New York Giants quarterback
- Peyton Manning, former Indianapolis Colts and Denver Broncos quarterback
- Pete Maravich, basketball Hall of Famer, played for LSU and NBA's New Orleans Jazz
- Sammy Martin, former New England Patriots running back
- Tyrann Mathieu, player for NFL's Kansas City Chiefs
- Bo McCalebb, Macedonian basketball player who plays for Montepaschi Siena
- Max McGee, NFL player on five championship teams
- Sylvester McGrew, former Green Bay Packers defensive end
- Greg Monroe, college basketball player for Georgetown University
- Paul Morphy, world chess champion
- Patrick Mullins, professional soccer player
- Steve Mura, retired pitcher in Major League Baseball
- Eddie Murray, prolific NFL placekicker
- Antonio Narcisse, football player
- Herman Neugass, Track & field athlete who boycotted the Berlin Olympic trials
- Mel Ott, Major League Baseball Hall of Famer
- Micah Owings, MLB pitcher
- Robert Pack, NBA player, assistant coach for New Orleans Pelicans
- Emmett Paré, professional tennis player and coach
- Joe Pasternack, head basketball coach at UC Santa Barbara
- Audrey Patterson, first African-American woman to win Olympic medal
- Chris Quinn, former NBA player and current Miami Heat assistant coach
- Eldridge Recasner, former NBA player
- Sam Renick (1910–1999), jockey
- Ham Richardson, professional tennis player
- Alana Shipp, American/Israeli IFBB professional bodybuilder
- Nate Singleton, former wide receiver for San Francisco 49ers
- Neil Smith, former defensive end, Kansas City Chiefs
- Truett Smith, former football player
- Rusty Staub, Major League Baseball player
- Ricky Starks, All Elite Wrestling FTW Heavyweight Champion.
- Kordell Stewart, former NFL quarterback
- Patrick Surtain, former NFL cornerback
- Ron Swoboda, former New York Mets outfielder
- Ike Taylor, cornerback, Pittsburgh Steelers
- Roosevelt Taylor, safety, 1963 NFL champion, Chicago Bears
- Vincent Taylor, defensive tackle for the Atlanta Falcons
- Taryn Terrell, professional wrestler for Total Nonstop Action Wrestling
- Mike Wallace, wide receiver for Pittsburgh Steelers
- Bryce Washington (born 1996), basketball player for Hapoel Galil Elyon of the Israeli Basketball Premier League
- Ron Washington, former MLB player and manager who is currently the third base coach for the Atlanta Braves
- Reggie Wayne, wide receiver for Indianapolis Colts
- Aeneas Williams, former cornerback for St. Louis Rams
- Jason Williams (born 1983), basketball player for Hapoel Be'er Sheva of the National Basketball League of Israel
- Korey Williams, Canadian Football League player

== Other ==
- Raymond Arroyo, employer of EWTN
- Bessie Behan, social leader
- Kate Walker Behan, club leader and philanthropist
- Ruby Bridges, commemorated for her role, as a child, in racial integration of the New Orleans Public School System
- Michelangelo Canale, dancer, choreographer and Ballet teacher
- Marie Couvent, 19th century Creole philanthropist
- Betty DeGeneres, LGBT rights activist
- Caroline Dormon, horticulturalist and historian
- Marianne Celeste Dragon Creole socialite and the subject of a painting by José Francisco Xavier de Salazar y Mendoza
- David Ferrie, pilot investigated in the assassination of President Kennedy
- Myra Clark Gaines, socialite and subject of the longest lawsuit in US history
- Jean Margaret Gordon, suffragette
- Kate M. Gordon, suffragette
- Margaret Haughery, philanthropist
- Marie Alice Heine, first American Princess of Monaco
- Sir Lady Java, drag queen, actress and transgender rights activist
- Blaine Kern, Mardi Gras float designer and builder
- TJ Kirk, YouTuber
- Marie Laveau, "voodoo queen"
- Sara T. Mayo, physician and humanitarian reformer
- Eleanor McMain, civic activist
- Sally Miller: The Lost German Slave Girl
- Allison 'Tootie' Montana, Mardi Gras Indian, "chief of chiefs"
- Paul Morphy, unofficial world chess champion
- Homer Plessy, early civil rights activist
- Jerome Smith, civil rights activist
- Edith Rosenwald Stern, philanthropist
- Paul Tulane, benefactor of Tulane University
- Sylvanie Williams, educator and women's club activist
- Sophie B. Wright, educator and clubwoman

== See also ==
- List of people from Louisiana
- List of Tulane University people
- List of Loyola University New Orleans people
