= Zaorski =

Zaorski is a Polish surname. Notable people with this name include:

- Andrzej Zaorski (1942–2021), Polish actor and cabaret artist
- Jan Zaorski (1887–1956), Polish surgeon and hospital director
- Janusz Zaorski (born 1947), Polish film director, screenwriter and actor, the brother of Andrzej
- Linnzi Zaorski (born 1978), American jazz singer and songwriter
