= John Beaufort =

John Beaufort may refer to:

- John Beaufort, 1st Earl of Somerset (c. 1373–1410)
- John Beaufort, 1st Duke of Somerset (1403–1444)
- John Beaufort, Marquess of Dorset (c. 1455–1471)
- Jean J. Beaufort (1832–1897), known as John Joseph Beaufort, Union Army Medal of Honor recipient
