= Joseph Mansion =

Joseph Mansion may refer to:

- Joseph Mansion (philologist)
- Joseph Mansion (politician)
