= Mary Sherman =

Mary Sherman may refer to:

- Mary Antoinette Brown-Sherman (1926–2004), Liberian educator
- Mary Belle Sherman (1862—1935), American clubwoman, parliamentarian, and conservationist
- Mary S. Sherman (1913–1964), American orthopedic surgeon and cancer researcher
- Mary Sherman (artist) (born 1957), American artist and curator
- Mary Sherman Morgan (1921–2004), American rocket fuel scientist
