= Chris Owens =

Chris Owens may refer to:

- Chris Owens (actor) (born 1961), Canadian television actor
- Chris Owens (American football) (born 1986), American football player
- Chris Owens (basketball) (born 1979), American basketball player
- Chris Owens (burlesque performer), American burlesque performer in New Orleans
- Chris Owens, Puerto Rico-born American political activist in New York, son of U.S. Congressman Major Owens
- Christopher Owens (born 1979), guitarist, singer and songwriter, formerly of the San Francisco band Girls

== See also ==
- Chris Owen (disambiguation)
