= Little Red Wagon (disambiguation) =

Little Red Wagon is a 2012 docudrama directed by David Anspaugh and written by Patrick Sheane Duncan.

Little Red Wagon may also refer to:

- "Little Red Wagon" (song), 2015
- Dodge Little Red Wagon, a drag racing truck introduced in 1965
- Little Red Wagon Foundation, a charity for children in need
- Little Red Wagon, a 1999 album by Bart Ramsey and Neti Vaan
- My Little Red Wagon, a book by Alma Powell
- Little Red Wagon Playschool, a playschool in Newton, Massachusetts

== See also ==
- Radio Flyer
