= Yvonne LaFleur =

American fashion designer

Yvonne LaFleur (born 1947) is an American fashion designer, businesswoman and owner-founder of the boutique Yvonne LaFleur; located in the Carrollton Riverbend neighborhood of New Orleans, Louisiana.

== Life and career ==
LaFleur came to New Orleans from San Francisco with her mother, Cecile LaFleur, when she was four years old. They lived with her three aunts, who all worked in elegant fashion department stores; which gave LaFleur an early experience with high class fashion. LaFleur learned how to sew from her grandmother. In 2011, LaFleur said that by the time she was 11, she could make anything without a pattern.

LaFleur attended Cabrini High School and Louisiana State University; where she majored in merchandising and fashion. During her senior year, LaFleur ran a modeling school for a small boutique. She learned to design clothes while living in New York City; and commercial pattern making while working at an atelier in Paris under Maxi Librati. Just months after graduating, LaFleur partnered with entrepreneur Charles Montgomery from Fayette, Mississippi in opening her own boutique on October 15, 1969; then called You Boutique. By 1984, the shop was profitable enough for LeFleur to buyout Montgomery. He later invested in her opening a shop in New York City; where she distributed her designs to 400 stores.

LaFleur's business style grew from being the first to sell women's jeans in the 1960s for $8 to offering wedding dresses and bridal gowns, lingerie, debutante and Mardi Gras gowns. She was the first to carry designs called Gunne Sax by Jessica McClintock in 1971. When she premiered her own signature perfume, (which took two years to develop) the boutique changed its name to Yvonne Lafleur on May 1, 1984. The shop offers LaFleur's own creations and designs from the New York factory she owned in the 1970s. LaFleur said in a 2025 interview that about eighty-five percent of the clothes in the store were her own brand, made in the United States. The boutique also specializes in on-location alterations and bespoke orders; something LaFleur learned while working in Paris.

Described as a "skilled milliner", LaFleur inherited a collection of hat blocks from her aunt, Alice LaFleur. LaFleur created 200 hats for the 1981 film about Coco Chanel called Chanel Solitaire

== Internet popularity ==
In early 2025, marketing expert Angelique Frizzell convinced LaFleur that she should be on social media. Subsequently, the on-going series of videos and tutorials garnered not only a substantial number of followers across social media platforms; but a direct increase in customer interest and frequency. In an article for Country Magazine, writer Susan Marquez states: "People are planning their vacations to New Orleans just to shop at the store."

== Personal life ==
While traveling between her New Orleans and New York shops, LaFleur met her husband, James C. Walsh. Walsh is Joe Namath's attorney. LaFleur and Walsh have seven children. Daughters Mary Jane and Elizabeth work alongside LaFleur in her boutique.

== See also ==
- Coco Chanel
