= Kiki Cavazos =

American folk, country, and Americana singer-songwriter

Kiki Cavazos is an American folk, country, and Americana singer-songwriter.

Born in Montana, Cavazos spent much of her youth traveling around the American West with her father. While a teenager she left home, lived in Alaska and Mexico, eventually settling in New Orleans, Louisiana where she became part of the city's music community.

In New Orleans, Cavazos co-founded the folk group Sundown Songs with Alynda Mariposa Segarra (later of Hurray for the Riff Raff), Sam Doores (later of The Deslondes), Pat Reedy, Jessie Carmerdiener and Ross Hartman. Sundown Songs released Like a Jazz Band in Nashville in 2008. The self-produced recording was sold in brown paper bags.

Cavazos has self-released two albums, Two Bit Gambler and Early Mountain Songs. Two Bit Gambler was recorded in 2014 in New Orleans, Louisiana and released on February 19, 2018. Performing on the album are Cavazos on guitar and vocals, Corey McGillvary on bass and vocals, John James Tourville on pedal steel guitar, Button on harmonicas, and Camille Weatherford, vocals. Early Mountain Songs was recorded in 2009 in Asheville, North Carolina and released in 2024. The album features Cavazos on guitar and vocals and Gill Landry on harmonica and was recorded in Landry's home.

Cavazos released the full-length album Goodbye Blues, produced by Ajai Combelic and Sam Doores on Brooklyn-based Jalopy Records, in April 2026. The album was recorded at Lil Squeeze Studio in New Orleans.

Cavazos was invited to perform at the Newport Folk Festival on the Museum Stage in 2018.

In September 2024, Cavazos performed in Santiago de Compostela, Spain with Pajaro Sunrise as part of Hola Nola Lab-Fest, a musical exchange project between musicians from New Orleans and Spain.

== Discography ==
=== as a leader ===
- Two Bit Gambler (self release, 2018)
- Early Mountain Songs (self release, 2024)
- Goodbye Blues (Jalopy, 2026)

=== with Sundown Songs ===
- Like a Jazz Band in Nashville (self release, 2008)
