= Chris Owen =

Chris Owen may refer to:

- Chris Owen (actor) (born 1980), American actor
- Chris Owen (cricketer) (born 1963), Australian cricketer
- Chris Owen (director) (born 1944), Australian filmmaker

== See also ==
- Chris Owens (disambiguation)
