= Alice Dalsheimer =

American writer

- Born: December 1, 1845
- Died: January 15, 1880 (aged 34)
- Writing career
- Pen name: Salvia Dale
- Genre: poetry

Alice Dalsheimer (December 1, 1845 – January 15, 1880) was an American poet from New Orleans, Louisiana. She published in local newspapers under the pseudonym of Salvia Dale.

== Biography ==
She was born Alice Solomon in New Orleans, Louisiana. She received her education in the city schools, and in 1865 became a teacher. Her score on the qualifying examination headed a list of 250 applicants. In 1867 she married Mr. Dalsheimer, a lawyer, and gave up teaching, but resumed it in 1873, when she became principal of the girls' department of a school under the management of the Hebrew Educational Society, where she remained until 1878. She died in New Orleans in 1880.

Her writings consist of numerous sketches, short stories, and poems, principally the latter, all of which appeared in the daily papers of New Orleans under the pseudonym of “Salvia Dale.” Her works have never been collected and published in book form. Her entry in Appletons' Cyclopædia of American Biography rates “Motherhood” and “Twilight Shadows” the best of her poems.
