= Margaret Clark (American writer) =

American historian, writer, and educator

Margaret Clark (born 1964) is an American historian, writer, and educator.

== Career ==
Clark is a native of New Orleans, Louisiana. She received her Bachelors of Arts degree from Thomas Edison State College, her Master of Science (MS) degree from Touro University in New York, and has done graduate work at Harvard University in Cambridge, Massachusetts and at Trinity College in Dublin, Ireland. In 2017, she was awarded a Master of Letters in Scottish History by the University of Dundee in Scotland. She has written extensively for television and magazines. Her books have been translated into several languages.

== Selected work ==
- Yellow Jack: A History of Yellow Fever (1997)
- Inspiration: Your Guide to Better Breathing (1998)
- By Louisiana Hands (2002)
- First of Her Kind (2002)
- The Louisiana Irish (2005)
- Asthma: a Clinicians Guide (2010)
- Walking Through Rome (2013)
- Respiratory Care: Cardiopulmonary Anatomy & Physiology (2020)
