= Bart Ramsey =

- Born: November 3, 1954 (age 71)
- Genres: Gypsy Jazz, Jazz, Folk rock
- Occupations: Songwriter, bandleader, musician, author
- Instruments: piano, accordion, guitar,
- Years active: 1978–present
- Label: Jumping Man Records
- Member of: Zazou City

Bart Ramsey (born November 3, 1954) is a New Orleans composer, author, singer and jazz musician who formed the gypsy swing band Zazou City. Through his countless performances of Ramsey's original compositions in New Orleans, and especially in the Faubourg Marigny area of the city, Gypsy Swing has recently become solidly infused into the New Orleans jazz repertoire. In Zazou City, Ramsey performs on piano and accordion, backed by a four- or five-piece band that moves between upbeat and mellow tunes. He has recently toured Italy, performing with the famed Gramo Gramentieri and other virtuosi.

Bart Ramsey performed at the New Orleans Jazz & Heritage Festival on May 4, 2012, with Zazou City, where the performance garnered a standing ovation. He has performed with many New Orleans musicians through the years of 1988–present, including the New Orleans Jazz Vipers. He has written several novels and recorded numerous solo and band albums.

== Discography ==
- Prince of Sanity (1996, Bart Ramsey)
- Zing Zang (1996, Ramsey, Vaan & Halverson)
- Little Red Wagon (1999, Bart Ramsey & Neti Vaan)
- Robinson Ear's Little Whirled of Sound (2000, Rob Halverson)
- In Search Of a Cheap Hotel (2001, Ramsey & Vaan)
- Amnesia Cafe (2005, Bart Ramsey)
- Rob Halversons Second Whirled (2005, Rob Halverson)
- Live In Italia (2006, Bart Ramsey & 39 Strangers)
- Melomania (2006, Vavavoom)
- Swingphonicity (2007, Vavavoom)
- Liar's Moon (2010, Zazou City)
- The Man Who Couldn't Dream (2012, Zazou City)
- Insomnia Street Chronicles (2023, Bart Ramsey)
