= Jessica McClintock =

American fashion executive and designer (1930–2021)

- Born: June 19, 1930; Presque Isle, Maine, U.S.
- Died: February 16, 2021 (aged 90); San Francisco, California, U.S.
- Resting place: Presque Isle, Maine
- Education: Boston University; San Jose State University
- Occupations: fashion designer former school teacher
- Title: founder, president & CEO of Jessica McClintock, Inc.
- Spouse(s): AI Staples(late husband); Fred McClintock(divorced)

Jessica Gagnon McClintock (June 19, 1930 – February 16, 2021) was founder, President and CEO of Jessica McClintock, Inc., an American retail company based in San Francisco, California. She was a designer of formalwear for women. In 2013, after 43 years in fashion, McClintock changed her business strategy from designing and company-owned retail stores to a master brand licensing model. Up to her death in 2021, she directed the overall direction and execution of her brand through manufacturer-licensees.

== Early life ==
McClintock was born as Jessica Gagnon in Presque Isle, Maine on June 19, 1930. Her father was a shoe salesman, and her mother was a beautician. When she told her mother of her dream of designing dresses, her mother encouraged her to use her creative side. Using skills she learned at an early age from her artist grandmother, she made a name in fashion quickly. She attended Boston University from 1947 to 1949.

== Personal life and death ==
McClintock attended Boston University from 1947 to 1949. At age 19, McClintock quit her studies to marry Al Staples, an engineering student at MIT. Shortly after marrying, McClintock obtained her Bachelor of Arts degree from San Jose State University in California.

In 1963, Al Staples died in an automobile accident. This led to a second marriage, to airplane pilot Fred McClintock, who was a friend of her late husband. This marriage shortly ended in a divorce in 1967. Jessica McClintock was a school teacher in Marblehead, Massachusetts, 1966–68 and Long Island, New York, 1968. After the divorce, McClintock and her son Scott moved to San Francisco, California. McClintock continued her career as a school teacher at Nimitz Elementary School in Sunnyvale, California, 1964–65 and 1968–69. On February 16, 2021, Jessica Mcclintock died at age 90.

== Career ==
While living in San Francisco, in 1969 McClintock met Eleanor Bailey, who was the head of design and production and looking for investors for Gunne Sax Company, a local dress store. In 1970, McClintock invested $5,000 from her savings and became partners with Bailey, directly in charge of the designing and marketing of the new dress line. Bailey stepped down., leaving McClintock the sole owner of Gunne Sax.

McClintock started with a single-line clothing company and expanded it into a multifaceted outlet targeting international customers looking to purchase bridal, junior and children's designer clothing. McClintock's main design focus was on "romance." Her designs sold worldwide, including regions such as the Middle East, Asia and Europe. In 1979, two new clothing lines were created: One was to target girls with the Gunne Sax line, and the other was a secondary contemporary line under the McClintock name/label. Since these two lines became a success, McClintock was able to open her own retail stores. The first Jessica McClintock store was opened in San Francisco in 1981. A year later, Jessica's son, Scott McClintock, joined the company and made two clothing lines that were manufactured under labels of Scott McClintock Dresses and Scott McClintock Sport. In 1987, Jessica McClintock renamed Gunne Sax as Jessica McClintock. She also added sleepwear lines and her fragrance line. By the mid-90s, McClintock had opened a total of 41 boutiques with reported annual sales of $100 million, and her dresses were sold in department stores in the U.S. and other countries.

== Change in strategy ==
After spending over 40 years creating satin, silk and tulle gowns, fragrances and other products, McClintock shifted her role with the company at the age of 83 to the oversight of the Jessica McClintock master brand licensing business. With the closing of the designer's stores, outlets, and online store by November 2013, her company transitioned to a full licensing model with the company growing through leading category licensees.

Today the Jessica McClintock brand offers fragrance, handbags, fashion jewelry, eyewear, fashion accessories, and home products.
