= John Craft (politician) =

American politician

John Craft (May 20, 1847-?) was a politician in Alabama. He was born in New Orleans, Louisiana. He became a businessman in Mobile, Alabama and was in the fruit trade with South America. He was a Democrat. He married. He was a Presbyterian.

He joined the Ku Klux Klan and was a "Redeemer". He served as an alderman in Mobile. He was in the grocery business and banana trade. He served in the Alabama Senate from 1918 to 1933.

A House Join Resolution in 1923 commended him for his road building efforts.

He supported betting on horse racing and a bill to repeal Alabama's "bone dry" law. He supported Senator Robinson's opposition to Senator Heflin.

He attended the dedication of the Saenger Theatre in Mobile. A section of Alabama State Route 5, the Craft Highway, is named for him.

== See also ==
- Good Roads Movement
- Old Spanish Trail (auto trail)
