= John Churchill Chase =

American cartoonist

John Churchill Chase (1905–1986) was a cartoonist and writer. He was known for his editorial cartoons and his works on the history of his native New Orleans and Louisiana in the United States.

== Career ==
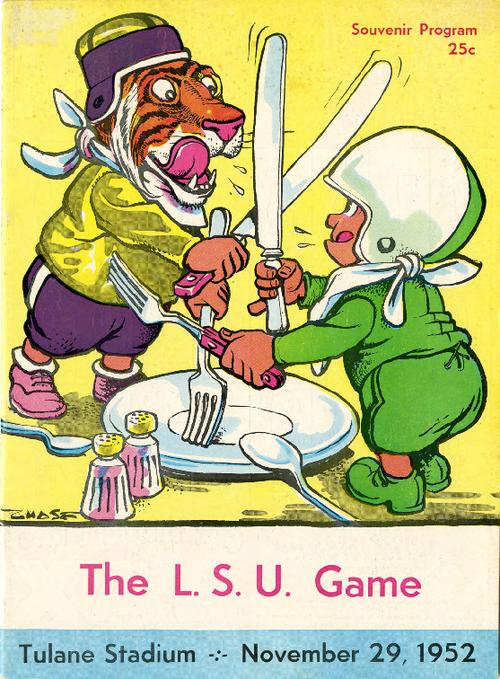
1952 example of Chase's cover art for "The Greenie" Tulane University souvenir football programs

After high school in New Orleans, Chase attended the Chicago Academy of Fine Arts. He worked as assistant cartoonist to Frank King at the Chicago Tribune on the popular comic strip Gasoline Alley and other cartoons, before returning to New Orleans in 1927 to become editorial cartoonist for the New Orleans Item. He would continue this role through 1964, by which time the newspaper had become The States-Item. Chase's chief character in his cartoons was "Mr. New Orleans" or "The Little Man", who was typically dressed in a 19th-century long coat with a top hat, bushy moustache and glasses.

He is the author of the book Frenchmen, Desire, Good Children and Other Streets of New Orleans. This book went through several popular editions from the 1960s through 1997, and has gone on to be widely acclaimed as a great chronicling of the history of New Orleans through the naming of its streets.

Chase's other works include the book Louisiana Purchase: an American Story.

He composed editorial cartoons on television on WDSU during the 1960s. Other art works of his included a mural depicting the history of New Orleans in cartoons for the main branch of the New Orleans Public Library. In a departure from his usual work, in 1960 Chase produced a large "Transfiguration" in stained glass over the vestibule of St. Dominic Catholic Church in New Orleans.

Chase taught New Orleans history at Tulane University, sometimes collaborating with Pie Dufour on classroom instruction, and cartooning at the University of New Orleans. For many years, his cartoons graced the football game programs at Tulane University, which maintains an exhibit of his artworks for their football programs.

He also created cartoons and illustrations for projects outside of New Orleans. One of his notable projects was a series of cartoons featuring the Texas Longhorns' mascot "Bevo" for the University of Texas at Austin in the 1950s and 1960s.

== Tributes ==
A small street in the New Orleans Central Business District was named "John Churchill Chase" after his death. This was a section of street formerly named Calliope (one of a series of streets in the area named after the Muses). This street runs perpendicular to the Mississippi River, through the New Orleans Warehouse District, about two blocks downriver (north, at this point) from the Crescent City Connection Bridge.

== Selected works ==
- Chase, John Churchill. Frenchmen, Desire, Good Children and Other Streets of New Orleans, 1st ed. New Orleans: Crager, 1949.
- Chase, John Churchill. Today's Cartoon, Hauser Press, New Orleans, 1962.
- Allen, Edison B. Of Time and Chase, 1st. ed New Orleans: Hambersham, 1969
