= Pat Barberot =

- Birth name: Ladner Joseph Barberot
- Born: March 17, 1926
- Died: April 5, 2007 (aged 81)
- Genres: Big band, jazz
- Occupation: Band leader
- Instrument: Saxophone
- Formerly of: Pat Barberot Orchestra
- Website: patbarberotorchestra.com

Pat Barberot (born Ladner Joseph Barberot; March 17, 1926 – April 5, 2007) was an American band leader. He was the founder and band leader of one of New Orleans' longest running big bands, the Pat Barberot Orchestra.

From the late 1930s until 2007, Barberot's band, with his saxophone out front, performed its own arrangements of classics including the big band composers Glenn Miller, Stan Kenton, Louis Prima, and Sy Oliver. In 1970, Barberot realized that venues for big band were fading away, so he opened his own club, The Jefferson Orleans North. There his band performed big band hits including In The Mood, Moonlight Serenade, Sing, Sing, Sing (With a Swing), Midnight Tango and Eager Beaver at their weekly concerts for over 35 years.

In August 2005, the flooding that followed Hurricane Katrina destroyed much of the Jefferson Orleans North. Barberot later rebuilt the club and reunited his band, and they resumed performances four months later.

After taking ill in the fall of 2006, Barberot died on April 5, 2007, aged 81. He had served in the United States Navy during World War II.

The Pat Barberot Orchestra continues to play weekly, now under the direction of Pat Barberot's son (and drummer), Bryan Barberot. The Orchestra and its fans are the subject of a PBS documentary called A Place To Dance, which was scheduled to air on public television stations in the US in summer 2007.
