= Alphonse Maureau =

American painter

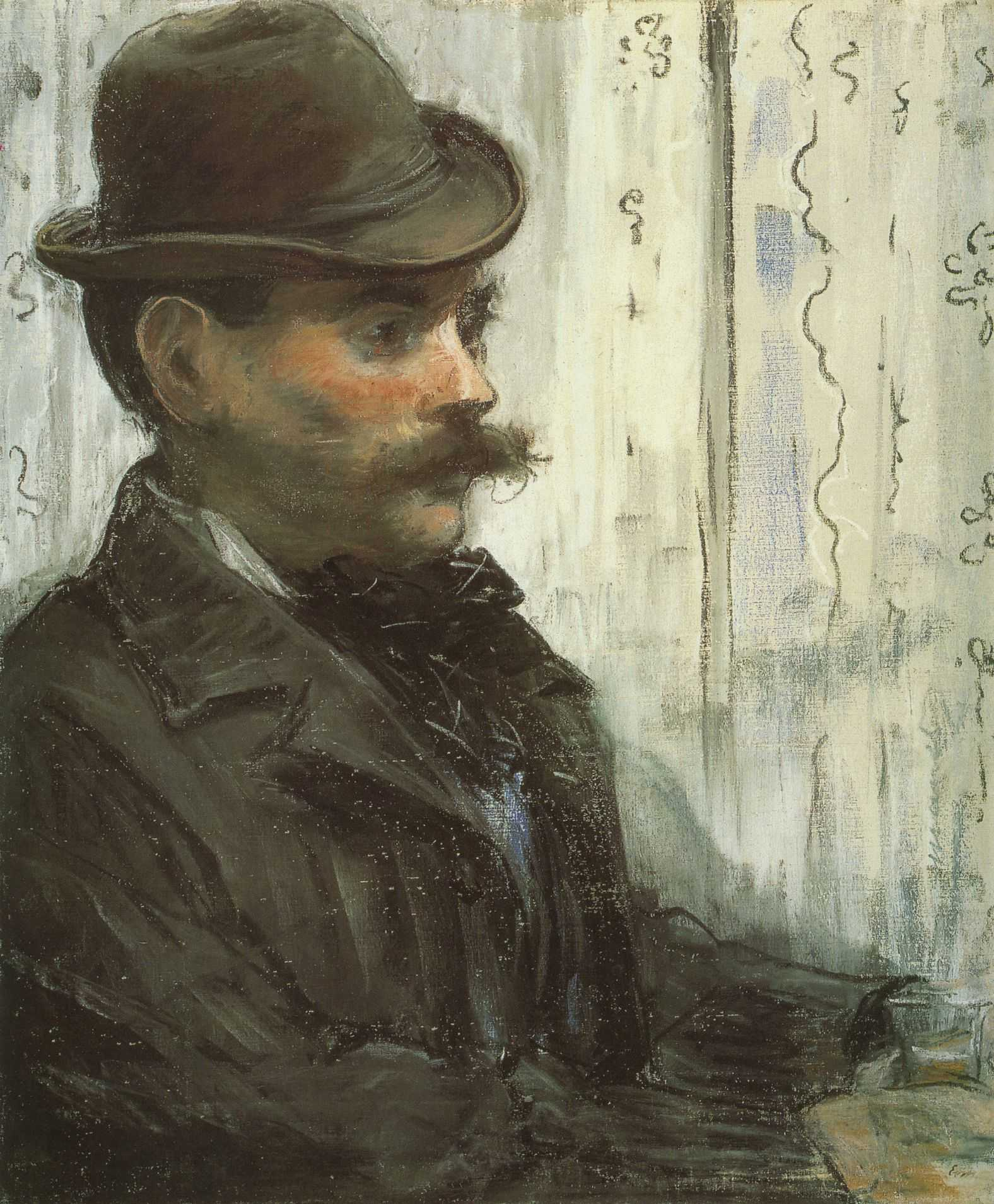
- Portrait of Alphonse Maureau, Édouard Manet, сirca 1880
- Born: Louis Alphonse Maureau; New Orleans (United States)
- Known for: Painting
- Movement: Impressionism

Louis Alphonse Maureau (c 1830 – c 1883) born in New Orleans, was a Franco-American Impressionist painter.

== Biography ==
Louis-Alphonse Maureau was born in New Orleans, United States. Maureau, according to Edgar Degas' recommendation, participated in the Third Exhibition of Impressionists in 1877.

In 1881, Alphonse Maureau exhibited at the Hôtel Drouot.
