= Brenda Hatfield =

American city official

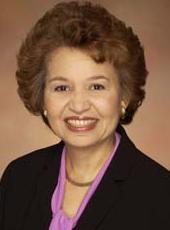
- Hatfield in 2007
- Born: July 26, 1943 (age 82); New Orleans, Louisiana, U.S.
- Occupations: Chief Administrative Officer, City of New Orleans
- Term: July 2005–May 2010
- Predecessor: Charles Rice
- Successor: Andy Kopplin
- Spouse(s): Charles J. Hatfield, IV
- Children: 2

Brenda Ann Garibaldi Hatfield (born July 26, 1943) is an American woman who served as chief administrative officer of the City of New Orleans under Mayor Ray Nagin.

== Nagin administration ==
Hatfield was appointed to the position of CAO in July 2005, less than a month before Hurricane Katrina. She has served as a member of the Nagin Administration's executive staff since 2004. Prior to her appointment as CAO, she served as Director of Intergovernmental Relations for the administration.

During the immediate aftermath of Hurricane Katrina, Hatfield set up base of operation in Baton Rouge for city personnel to begin the operations for emergency relief funding for New Orleans' citizens and city government. Shortly thereafter, Hatfield led a team of personnel to expedite the amendment of the city's budget to reflect the depleted revenue base.

Since Hurricane Katrina, Hatfield has worked with Mayor Nagin and others to establish the Office of Recovery, and help build an Office of Emergency Preparedness. She worked with the Sanitation Director to remove hurricane debris and provide new garbage collection services to the city. In 2007, she garnered the services of Public Financial Management, Inc. to make wholesale changes to the budget process by Budgeting for Outcomes. She is a Fellow of the Institute of Politics at Loyola University New Orleans.

== Personal life ==
Hatfield was born in New Orleans, Louisiana, to William V. Garibaldi Jr. (a World War II veteran) and Mary Ford Garibaldi. Dr Brenda Hatfield is married to Charles J. Hatfield IV and has two children—Eric Hatfield and Richard Hatfield.
