= The Deslondes =

Americana music group

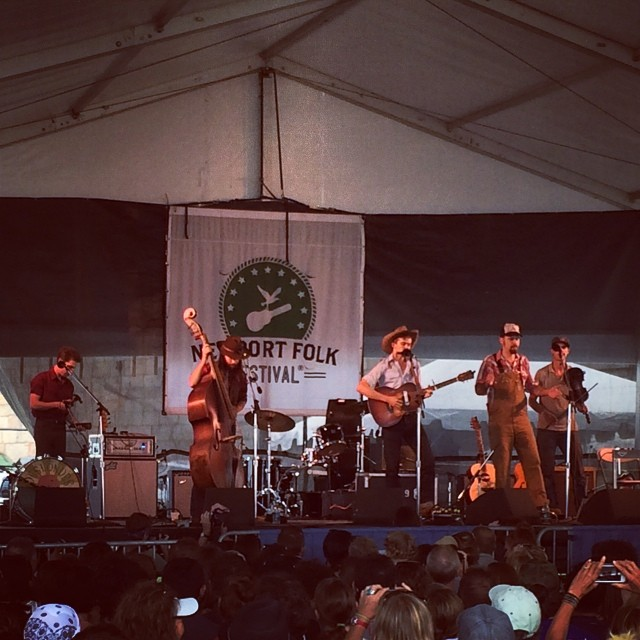

Background information
- Origin: New Orleans, Louisiana
- Genres: Americana, blues, rock 'n' roll, bluegrass, R&B, American roots music, gospel
- Years active: 2013–present
- Label: New West Records
- Members: Dan Cutler, Sam Doores, Riley Downing, Howe Pearson, John James Tourville
- Past members: Cam Snyder

The Deslondes are an Americana musical group from New Orleans, Louisiana. Their music blends influences from folk, rock 'n' roll, bluegrass, R&B, American roots music, blues, gospel, country, and zydeco. The group's members are Dan Cutler (vocals/stand-up bass), Sam Doores (vocals/guitar), Riley Downing (vocals/guitar), Howe Pearson (vocals/percussion), and John James Tourville (fiddle/pedal steel). All five members share in the songwriting process.

The band's first, self-titled album was released in 2015 on New West Records.

== History ==
The band formed in the gentrified section of the Holy Cross neighborhood in New Orleans' Lower Ninth Ward, and take their name from a street in that neighborhood. Sam Doores met Cameron Snyder while attending college. When Doores read Woody Guthrie's autobiography, Bound for Glory, he quit school to head to New Orleans with Snyder where they formed the band The Broken Wing Routine, and attended the Woody Guthrie Folk Festival in Oklahoma, where they met Missouri native Riley Downing. In New Orleans, Doores met Dan Cutler and formed The Tumbleweeds, while Snyder and John James Tourville met on tour with The Longtime Goners. Doores and Cutler also played in New Orleans band Hurray for the Riff Raff, for whom The Tumbleweeds often opened.

In 2013, The Tumbleweeds officially changed their name to The Deslondes and two years later released their first album, The Deslondes, to critical acclaim. Their first single, "Fought The Blues And Won," was premiered by NPR. The music video for the song "The Real Deal" premiered on Rolling Stone.

A portion of their song "Low Down Soul" was played during a scene in season 6, episode 3 of Longmire.

== Musical style ==
Doores describes the band's songwriting as a group process: "We're about as democratic as it gets. Five equal members who all write and contribute a whole lot to the project." Their influences are vast, encompassing nearly every American music style. Pitchfork writes,

"When the Deslondes open their self-titled debut with a walking piano line played way, way down the left side of the keyboard, they’re not just playing a rhythm that sounds distinctive in 2015 but also conveying an entire pop history that spans New Orleans rhythm and blues, early Memphis rock, Louisiana Hayride country, and every pick-up jazz band ever to busk on Royal Street."

== Discography ==
- Holy Cross Blues (2012, released as Sam Doores + Riley Downing & The Tumbleweeds)
- The Deslondes (2015, New West Records)
- Hurry Home (2017, New West Records)
- Ways & Means (2022, New West Records)
- Roll It Out (2024, New West Records)
- Don't Let It Die, Vol. 1 (2026, New West Records)
