= Charles L. Dufour =

American journalist

Charles L. "Pie" Dufour (1903–1996) was an American newspaper journalist, historian, humorist, and book author from New Orleans, Louisiana who served as a columnist for the New Orleans States-Item newspaper. He wrote approximately 9700 installments of his column "Pie Dufour's A La Mode" for the States-Item and for the Sunday edition of the New Orleans Times-Picayune during his newspaper tenure, from 1949 until his retirement in 1978. He authored 20 books and approximately 50 articles for scholarly literature. Dufour's column covered diverse topics including Louisiana history, New Orleans Mardi Gras, law, local sports, classical music, New Orleans cuisine, and European travel.

Dufour lived his entire life in New Orleans, except to serve in the US Army in World War II in a non-journalistic role. He attended Jesuit High School. He enrolled at Tulane University for college in 1921, although he commenced his career with newspapers before completing his degree. He ultimately completed his college degree in 1953. Dufour was awarded an honorary doctorate of humane letters by Tulane University in 1978, after retiring as a newspaper columnist.

Together with fellow local historian John Churchill Chase, he taught a course on New Orleans history at Tulane University for 25 years. Dufour referred to this course as "New Orleans on the Half Shell" as an acknowledgement of its emphasis on food and culture. Dufour was a member of the gourmet group in New Orleans called "La Societe des Escargots Orleanais".

A 1967 article in The New York Times characterized Dufour as a columnist and historian "who has devoted most of his professional life to the idea that history is news".

== Selected works ==
- Charles L. Dufour, John Chase, Walter G. Cowan, Osborne K. Leblanc, John Wilds. New Orleans, Yesterday and Today: A Guide to the City ISBN 978-0807127438
- Charles L. Dufour, The Night the War was Lost, University of Nebraska Press, 1994, ISBN 978-0-8032-6599-8.
- Charles L. Dufour, The Mexican War: A Compact History 1846 – 1848, Hawthorne Publishers, 1968.
- Charles L. Dufour, Gentle Tiger: The Gallant Life of Roberdeau Wheat, Louisiana State University Press, 1999, ISBN 0807123919.
- Charles L. Dufour, Ten Flags in the Wind: The Story of Louisiana. Harper & Row Publishers, 1967.
