= Al Shea =

American critic and actor (1927–2009)

- Born: Alvin Francis Caserta, Jr. November 23, 1927; New Orleans, Louisiana, US
- Died: August 20, 2009 (aged 81); New Orleans, Louisiana, US
- Occupations: Actor, Theatre critic

Al Shea (né Alvin Francis Caserta, Jr; November 23, 1927 in New Orleans – August 20, 2009 in New Orleans) was an actor and theatre critic particularly well known in New Orleans.

He spent his early childhood in Paducah, Kentucky, where his father obtained employment. While still a boy, his parents divorced. His father remained in Kentucky, where he remarried. His mother returned with her son to her family in New Orleans. Al's name was then officially changed to Alvin John Shea, Shea being his mother's maiden name. At the age of ten, Shea was heard on WWL radio as Jackey, in the serial, "The Life of Peggy Hill." His stage debut was as Tip in The Land of Oz, in 1941, at Le Petit Théâtre du Vieux Carré.

Shea served in the United States Navy, and matriculated at Tulane University. In 1955, he joined the staff of WDSU-TV, replacing Ed Nelson on "Tip-Top Space Ship," as Sparky. He then had success as Deputy Oops in "Adventures in Fun," in 1960. A bigger success followed when he was the voice of Pete the Penguin, to the Christmas marionette, Mr. Bingle. At WDSU, he was also Producer of the "Second Cup" show, with Bob & Jan Carr. He was also entertainment critic on the popular program, "Midday" (1963–73), with Terry Flettrich, where he interviewed many stars of the theatre and cinema. Throughout his career, Shea wrote on various facets of the Fine Arts and of entertainment, for varying media, and was often heard on radio, as well.

As an actor, Shea was seen in New Orleans in Our Town, The Boy Friend, The Merchant of Yonkers, Night Must Fall, Bye Bye Birdie, Mister Roberts, and All the King's Men. He also directed local productions of Lo and Behold! and Life with Father. His final stage appearance was in 1998, in Puss in Boots. He can be seen in the documentaries "New Orleans That Was" and "New Orleans TV: The Golden Age."

Shea wrote on theatre for several years for Gambit (until 1995), and, for twenty-three years, was theatre critic on WYES's "Steppin' Out." His final appearance on the program was only two months before his death, from cancer, at the age of eighty-one.

His marriage to the actress Janet Shea (née Bagnetto) ended in divorce; they had two sons and a daughter. Al Shea's funeral Mass took place in St. Louis Cathedral.
