= Mr. Bingle =

Fictional character used for marketing purposes by retailers in New Orleans, Louisiana

- Snowman character
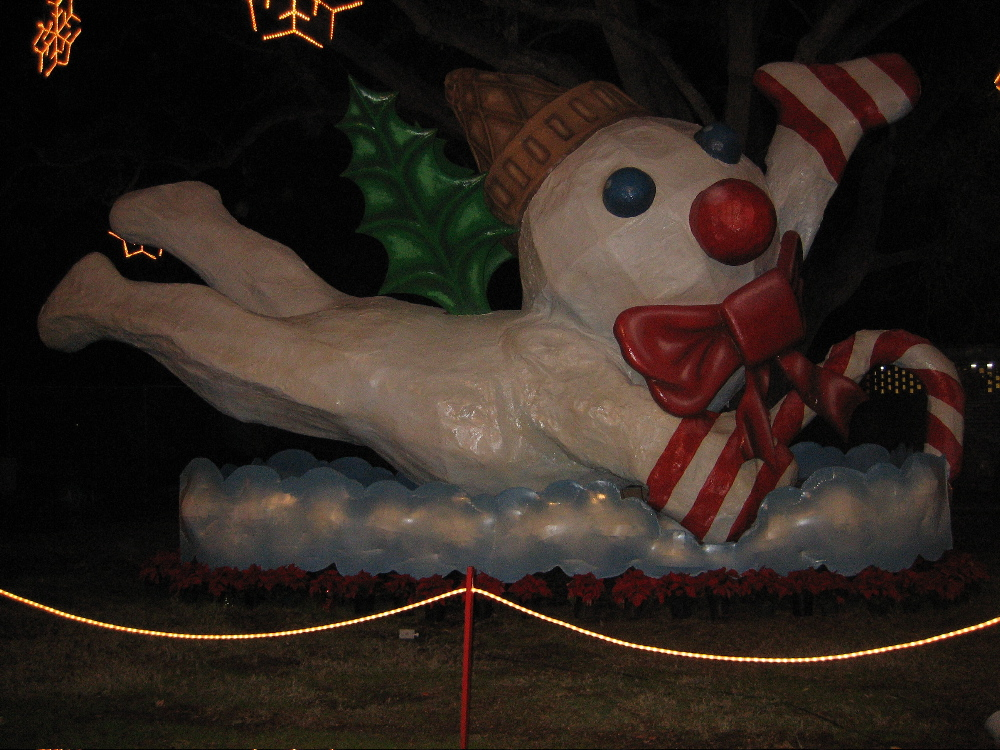
- Theme song: "Jingle, Jangle, Jingle, Here comes Mr. Bingle...; With another message from Kris Kringle.; Time to launch the Christmas season, Maison Blanche makes Christmas pleasin.'; Gifts galore for you to see, each a gem from... MB."
- Created by: Emile Alline
- Designed by: Emile Alline
- Portrayed by: Edwin "Oscar" Isentrout (1948-1985)
- Voiced by: Edwin "Oscar" Isentrout (1948-1985)

In-universe information
- Alias: Snow Doll
- Species: Snowman
- Gender: Male
- Title: Mister
- Affiliation: Santa Claus, Santa's elves
- Home: The North Pole, Santa's workshop

Mr. Bingle is a fictional character marketed and sold by department store Dillard's during the holiday season. Originating as a mascot of the Maison Blanche department store in New Orleans, Louisiana, Mr. Bingle has become an important part of the popular culture of the Greater New Orleans area, and across the United States.

== History ==
Mr. Bingle was originally conceived by Emile Alline, a window display manager of Maison Blanche, in 1947. Though conceived in 1947, Mr. Bingle was not introduced to the public until the Christmas season of 1948. Alline became aware that other department stores had mascots around Christmastime, particularly Marshall Field's Uncle Mistletoe, and pitched the concept of a similar mascot to Maison Blanche executives Lewis and Herbert Schuartz as an advertising strategy. Originally referred to as "Snow Doll", his name would quickly be changed to Mr. Bingle following a naming contest held among the employees of Maison Blanche, with the name being chosen by Lewis as it shared the initials of the store. Mr. Bingle and his home could both be abbreviated as "M.B.", and Maison Blanche was often referred to by its initials long before the creation of Mr. Bingle. This naming similarity was used heavily in marketing the character, even being referenced in his iconic theme song. Before his formal introduction to the public, his design was revised to include his iconic hat and candy cane.

The rights to the character would shift along with its parent company, with the majority of the locations being bought out by Goudchaux's, Inc. of Baton Rouge, owned by Hans and Josef Sternberg, and the company then operating as Goudchaux/Maison Blanche. Most of the Maison Blanche locations would be bought out by Dillard's in 1998, and the rights to the character would shift to them as a result. As of 2024, Dillard's continues to promote and sell merchandise of Mr. Bingle.

== Appearance ==
The design of Mr. Bingle is that of an anthropomorphic snowman, meaning that, while he is a snowman, he possesses human-like limbs and similar body structure. His facial features are traditionally represented by small blue dots for his eyes and red for his nose, with a small black line for a mouth assuming he is depicted with one, constantly smiling. On his back are a pair of holly wings that allow him to fly, and the year of sale usually stitched on his left foot (a doll sold in 2020, for example, will have 2020 stitched on his foot). He also wears a sugar ice cream cone on his head as a hat, as well holding a peppermint candy cane in his right hand. Traditionally, he is not depicted wearing clothing, aside from a red ribbon with bells at the tips tied around his neck, but much of his merchandise features him wearing different shirts, differing in design based on the year he is sold. A tag featuring his story is usually attached to his wings or his opposite hand.

== Story ==
Mr. Bingle was originally a regular snowman sitting near Santa's sleigh, when Santa used his magical powers to make him his helper. He gained the ability to walk and talk, was given holly wings and eyes soon after, as well as his iconic hat and candy cane. Santa gave him the name "Mr. Bingle", and he would help Santa from that day forward.

== Puppet shows ==
Mr. Bingle became best known in puppet (or marionette) form at the Canal Street Maison Blanche, puppeteered by New York puppeteer Edwin "Oscar" Isentrout (who also played the voice of Mr. Bingle). He had previously done puppetry not far from the store, on Bourbon Street, where he would do shows with vaudeville marionettes performing striptease in-between performances from exotic dancers. Isentrout often travelled around the United States with a marionette troop before buying a bus ticket to New Orleans, although he maintained his nightclub engagement, making it hard to perform the puppet shows at Maison Blanche. He would seek the assistance of two teenagers named Ray Frederick and Harry J. Ory, who had achieved some local success with their own marionette act. The three created many characters that would accompany Mr. Bingle and Santa Claus, such as a bear aptly named "Bingle Bear" and a rabbit named "Bingle Bunny", but neither would achieve the same level of success as the snowman. Isentrout portrayed Bingle as a childlike character, making him get into all sorts of hijinks and forcing Santa Claus to help him get out of whatever situation he was in. These puppet shows occurred each day for the few weeks leading up to Christmas for about 15 minutes at a time, and were a favorite of local children, with adults even coming by to watch the shows. Mr. Bingle would sometimes be forced to break the fourth wall and tell the adults to move so that the children could get a good look at the show. Mr. Bingle also appeared in musical radio and television commercials, many of which were fully animated. The puppet shows ended in 1985 when Isentrout died, and the character has remained silent ever since.

== Television show ==
The character would appear on television on the New Orleans channel WDSU and Memphis channel WMCTV Channel 5, where he would be accompanied by real actors in his puppet form, similar to Sesame Street. This show would air from Thanksgiving to the night before Christmas. These shows were also broadcast on the radio and done live in the store windows.

== Merchandise ==
=== Stuffed dolls ===
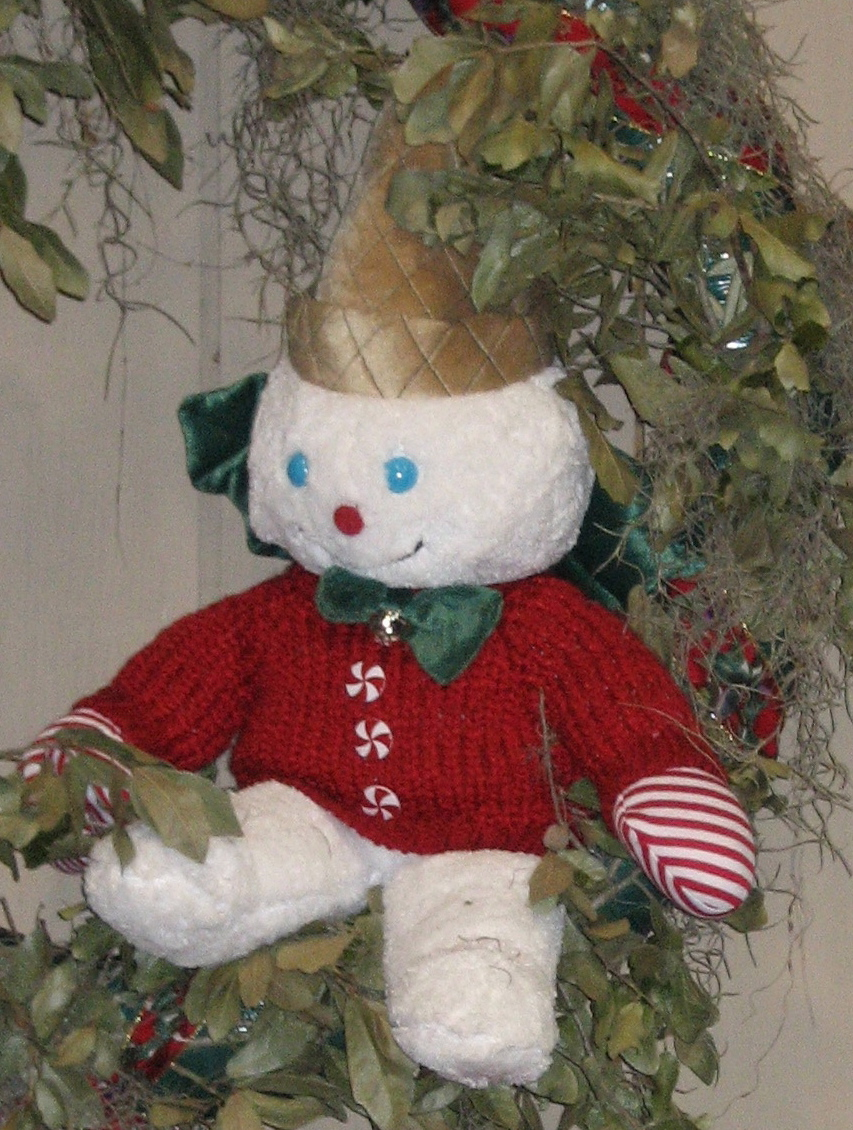
Mr. Bingle plush doll sold in 2005

Mr. Bingle-related merchandise, especially plush toys, were sold by Maison Blanche and manufactured in the United States, by Character Novelty Co., starting in 1949. The character has undergone many design changes, with the earlier dolls having chrome eyes and red mittens, and later dolls switching to the traditional blue eyes with red and white mittens. Some dolls even have a black nose and eyes, although these were manufacturers defects and were ordered to be destroyed, with the remaining dolls becoming rare. Other manufacturers defects among the dolls include hats that veer too far in either direction and oddly placed facial features. With the rise of social media platforms such as Facebook, communities have been formed dedicated to the buying and reselling of the dolls, and many listings have appeared on sites such as eBay.

=== Papier-mâché figure ===
Mr. Bingle was also displayed as a large papier-mâché figure on the front of the flagship Maison Blanche store on Canal Street, first standing next to Santa Claus and later in a flying form. The flying figure was displayed at the Metairie, Louisiana Maison Blanche Store and later at a Dillard's Metairie location when the Canal Street store was closed. By 2004 the Mr. Bingle figure was in such poor condition that it could not be displayed, although Dillard's continued to market small replicas. This figure has since become the most iconic of all Mr. Bingles, with most of the non-plush toy merchandise featuring the character in the exact same pose as the papier-mâché figure. By 2011 the Mr. Bingle figure was again reported to be in need of repairs.

=== Novels ===
A 2004 novel entitled Saving Mr. Bingle became a local success in New Orleans and Memphis; proceeds from the book were later used to buy a gravestone for Isentrout's unmarked grave at Hebrew Rest No. 3 Cemetery in New Orleans. When Hurricane Katrina hit New Orleans in August 2005, a levee collapsed near the warehouse where Mr. Bingle was stored, and the neighboring buildings were destroyed but Mr. Bingle survived. Spurred by this discovery, funds were raised to refurbish the display and it became a centerpiece of the Christmas 2005 "Celebration in the Oaks" light display at New Orleans City Park.

External media
- Media related to Mr. Bingle

Images
- Collection of on-line photos of Mr. Bingle, as seen in a Flickr group, Mr. Bingle Lives!

Video
- The Story of Mr. Bingle, as seen on YouTube

== Outside of New Orleans ==
Mr. Bingle also appeared in Memphis, Tennessee, at the department store Lowenstein's, which was also owned by Mercantile Stores Mercantile acquired MB a few years before itself being acquired by Dillard's. The Mercantile chain used Mr. Bingle in Christmas advertising nationwide at various regional department stores owned by Mercantile. As of November 2014, Mr. Bingle merchandise was still widely available.

== Legacy ==
Mr. Bingle continues to be popular in New Orleans and across Louisiana, even outside of the Christmas period, with a dedicated community of followers who buy and resell merchandise of the character. The character of Mr. Bingle would also make appearances outside of the commercial setting for charitable purposes, visiting sick children at the Manning Family Children's Hospital.

== See also ==
- Al Shea
- Companions of Saint Nicholas
