= Gunne Sax =

Retired clothing label from Jessica McClintock

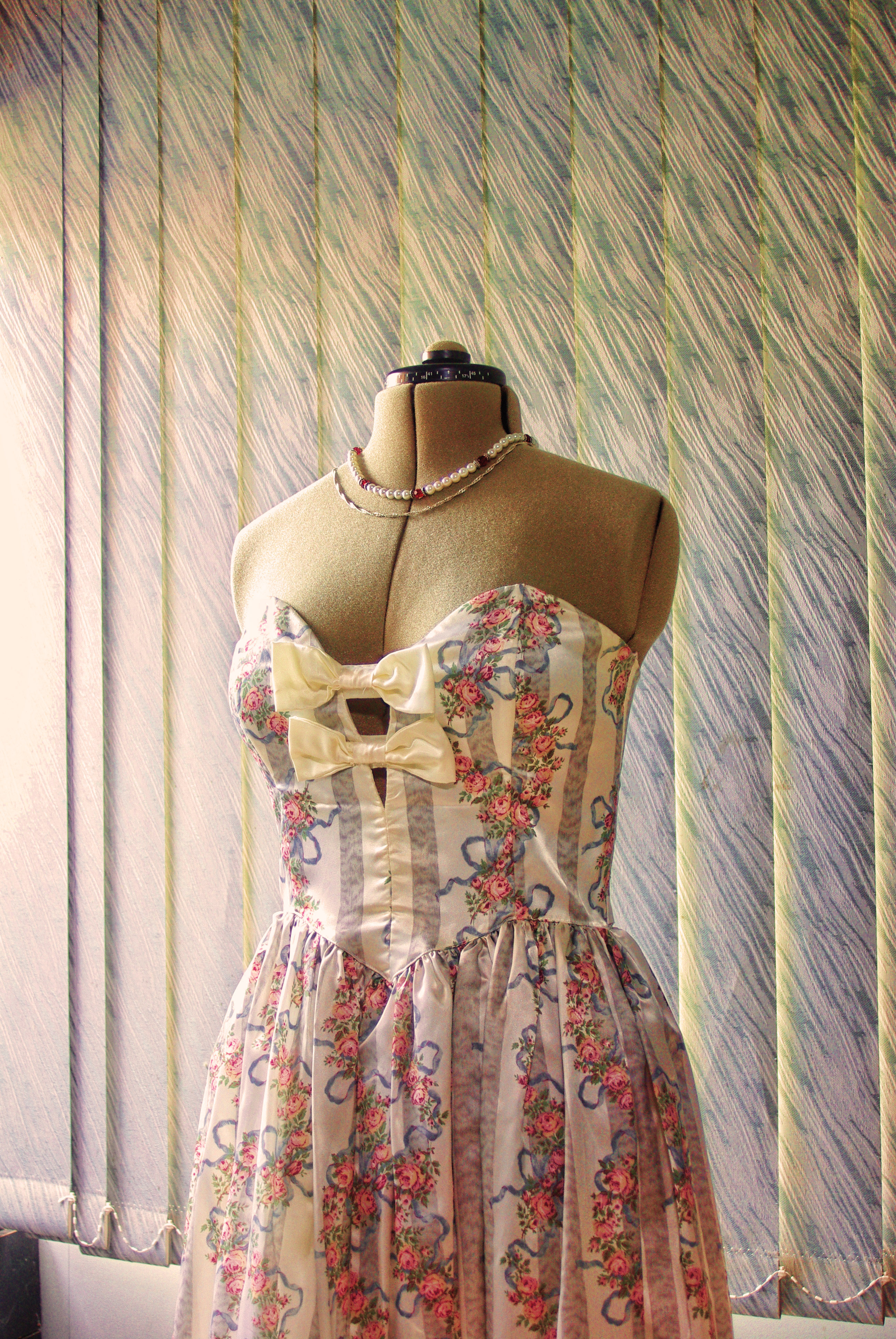
A Gunne Sax dress.

Gunne Sax is a retired clothing label owned by Jessica McClintock, Inc., which specialized in formal and semi-formal wear for young women. Eleanor Bailey and Carol Miller co-founded the label in San Francisco in 1967, before partnering with Jessica McClintock in 1969 for a $5,000 investment.

The name "Gunne Sax" was associated with the label's roots in prairie, Victorian, and Edwardian-styled designs which drew on many elements popular in late-19th and early-20th-century American fashion such as lace, gingham, and calico. The enterprise was named after the "gunny sack" (hessian/burlap bag) or trim used on some of the earlier dresses.

Gunne Sax also manufactured renaissance- and medieval-inspired designs, with empire waistlines and center plackets, and used other historical costume elements such as corset-like laced bodices and puffed sleeves that tightened below the elbow, a style popular in the Tudor period, and then in the 1820s, 1830s and 1890s, known as "leg o'mutton." The earliest labels are known amongst collectors as "black labels". Black labels with the text “Gunne Sax of California” were used only in 1969, making them the most rare to find, though current market value largely depends on the style of the dress. Black labels with the text “Gunne Sax by Jessica” were used from 1969 through the early 70’s. A white “hearts label" was used for a short time following, until, during the mid 1970s and early 1980s, a larger label with scrollwork was put into use.

From the 1980s onward, Gunne Sax dresses tended to follow modern prom dress sensibilities, such as tight, strapless bodices and full skirts, favoring fabrics like satin, taffeta, and tulle. In 1999 taffeta was the number one seller paired with matte satin or brocade corsets, with an addition of skirts made in tulle or dotted swiss.

Gunne Sax also had a children/young girls' line referred to as Jeunes Filles.

In 2023, online retailer ModCloth released a limited collection of Gunne Sax clothing.
