= Jan Zaorski =

Polish surgeon (1887–1956)

- Born: 6 May 1887; Kraków, Vistula Land, Russian Empire
- Died: 10 March 1956 (aged 68); Warsaw, Polish People's Republic
- Medical career
- Profession: Surgeon
- Institutions: Warsaw University

Jan Zaorski (6 May 1887 – 10 March 1956) was a Polish surgeon.

He was a student of Ludwik Rydygier and Zygmunt Radliński.

== Biography ==
In 1931, Zaorski became a director of the Elisabethan Hospital in Warsaw.

During the Occupation of Poland, he founded a Vocational Public School for Assistant Sanitary Staff (Prywatna Szkoła Zawodowa dla Pomocniczego Personelu Sanitarnego).

In 1945, he became a professor at Warsaw University. He was an author of more than 60 works, mainly about abdominal cavity surgery. He was also an author of scripts for students.
