= Linnzi Zaorski =

American jazz singer and songwriter

- Born: March 3, 1978; New Orleans, Louisiana, U.S.
- Genre: Jazz
- Occupations: Singer, songwriter
- Years active: 2002–present
- Member of: New Orleans Jazz Vipers, Delta Royale
- Website: www.linnzizaorski.com

Linnzi Zaorski (born March 3, 1978) is an American jazz singer and songwriter based in New Orleans, Louisiana.

In September 2006, she was the subject of a national radio piece by National Public Radio commentator Andrei Codrescu.

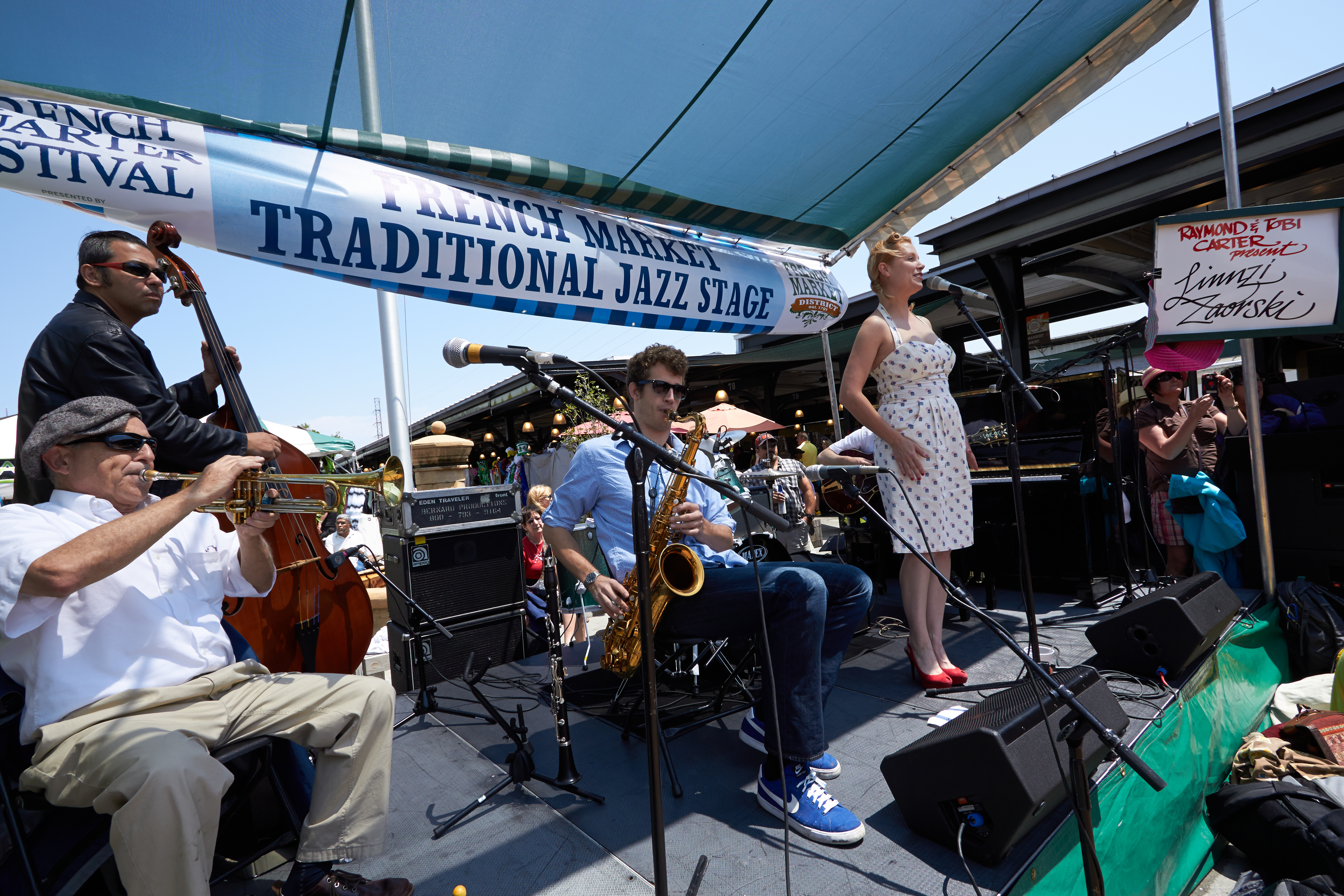
Zaorski and band on stage at French Quarter Festival 2013

== Music career ==
She started out performing with the New Orleans Jazz Vipers and then formed her own backing band, Delta Royale. In 2002, Zaorski and Delta Royale recorded their self-titled debut album, including standards such as "The Way You Look Tonight", "Stars Fell on Alabama", and "Dream a Little Dream of Me". The album contains seven live tracks recorded at the Spotted Cat in New Orleans and six studio tracks. Zaorski provides vocals, with Delta Royale providing guitar, bass, saxophone, clarinet, and trumpet. No drums appear on the recording.

Recorded in 2004, Hotsy-Totsy includes Zaorski's first original composition, "Better Off Dead", and standards such as "Hernando's Hideaway" and "It Don't Mean a Thing (If It Ain't Got That Swing)". Delta Royale added violin and washboard and recorded without clarinet or drums. "Better Off Dead" was featured in the film The Mechanic (2011) with Zaorski appearing as the jazz club singer.

== Critical reception ==
Offbeat magazine in New Orleans described Zaorski's first songwriting effort as fitting "snugly in the confines of Depression-era pop music". Delta Royale has been described as a "formidable band".Gambit described Zaorski and her debut album as being part of an influential traditional jazz movement in New Orleans that was bringing new energy to the scene.

== Discography ==
- Linnzi Zaorski & Delta Royale (2002)
- Hotsy-Totsy (2004)
- Hot Wax and Whiskey (2007)
- It's a Wonderful Record (Summertone, 2009)
- Naughty Sweetie (2011)
- Greet the Dawn (2016)
