= Prosper Lamal =

Belgian American businessperson

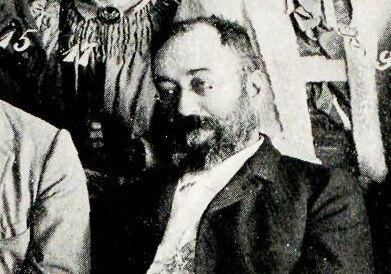
- Lamal in 1893
- Born: 1835 or 1836; Brussels, Belgium
- Died: March 11, 1895; New Orleans, Louisiana, United States
- Occupations: Businessperson; Entrepreneur
- Known for: Blue sidewalk tiles in New Orleans

Prosper Lamal was a 19th century Belgian businessman who emigrated to New Orleans, Louisiana. He is noted for the adoption of the blue sidewalk tiles on street corners in sections of the city built before 1950.

== Biography ==
Lamal was born in Brussels, Belgium, in 1835 or 1836. In Belgium, Lamal worked as an agent for various exporters of Belgian goods. His employment included being a representative for the firm Comptoir Industrial Belge. He went to New Orleans in 1884 when he was in charge of the Belgian exhibit at the World Cotton Centennial.

During his time with the World Cotton Centennial, Lamal met Marie Grandmont, a local woman who subsequently became his wife. At that point, Lamal decided to stay in New Orleans. He continued to import Belgian goods to New Orleans and elsewhere in the United States. These included the street tiles from the Belgian Encaustic Company. At the time, many streets in New Orleans were being paved and marked with street names, and the tiles that Lamal imported were then used on a widespread basis in New Orleans.

Lamal died at his home in New Orleans on March 11, 1895, at age 59 after a brief illness. He was survived by his wife and only child. Lamal is interred at St. Louis Cemetery No. 3 in New Orleans.

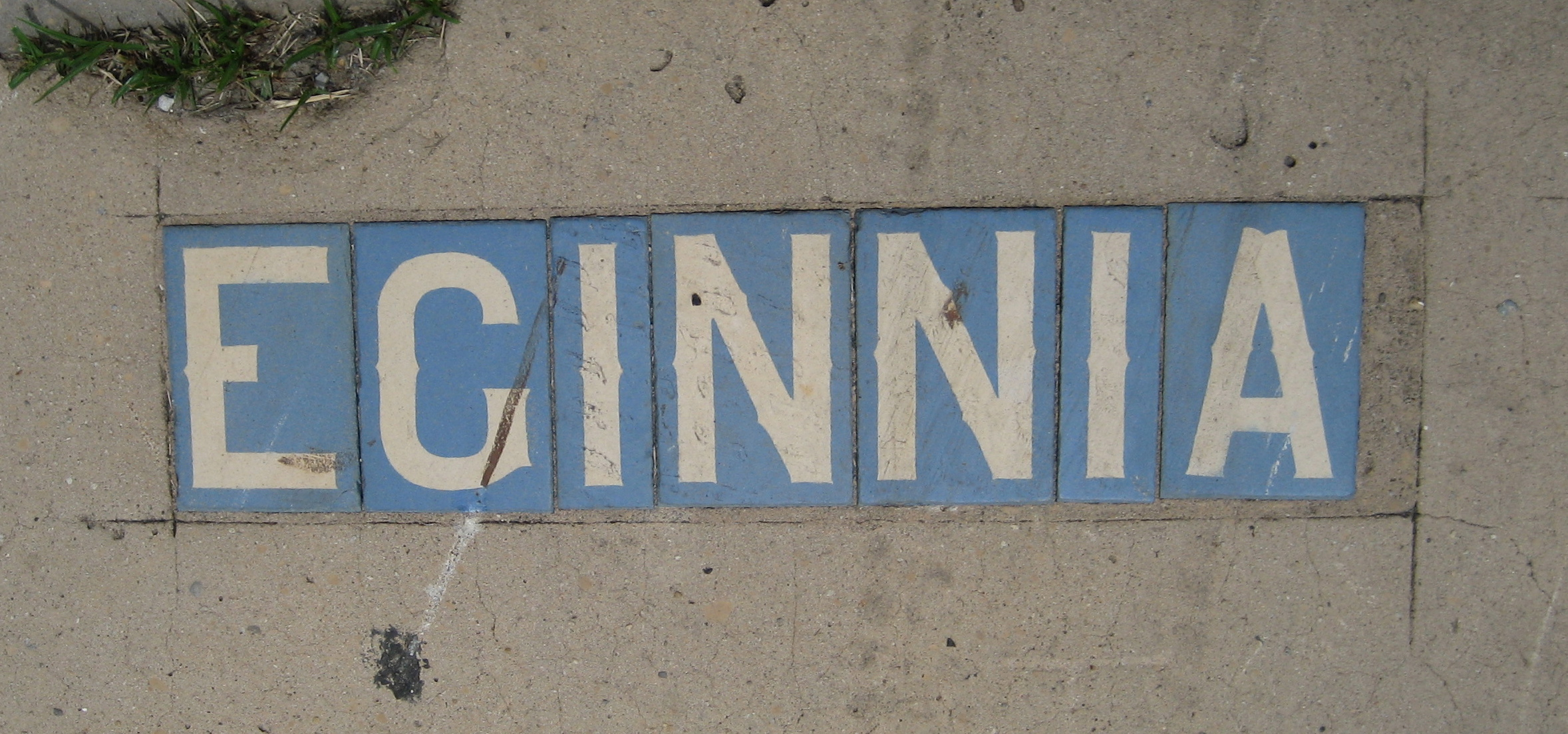
Early white on blue Belgian style street name tiles in New Orleans

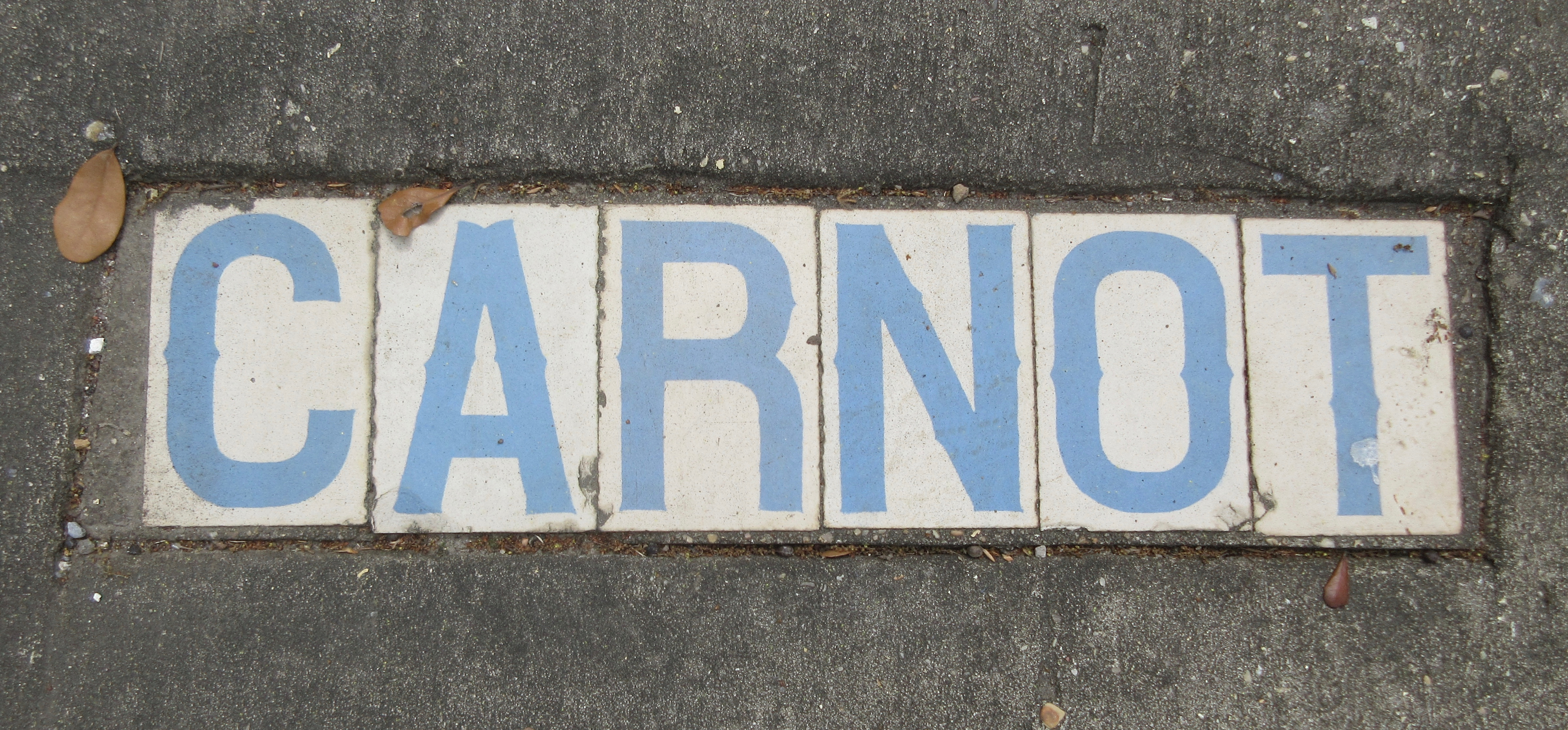
More common blue on white Belgian style street name tiles in New Orleans

=== Sidewalk tiles ===
Sidewalk tiles that spell street names are pervasive in older sections of New Orleans, including the French Quarter, Bywater, Tremé, Faubourg Marigny, the Garden District and certain areas of Uptown New Orleans. These are typically four inches by six inches, with a thickness of one inch, and one letter per tile. The tiles are almost all of encaustic construction in which colored clays, rather than a glaze, impart the color on the tile and result in considerable color stability. (Note: One source refers to these as "embedded alphabet tiles".)

In the late 19th century, transportation within the city of New Orleans was predominately by horse-drawn carriage or on foot. For this reason, street names posted at ground level on street corners made for effective signage. Soon after his arrival in New Orleans, Lamal recognized the paucity of street signage in the city and decided that the Belgian manufactured tiles would serve as suitable sidewalk level signage in the city. Initially, in 1884, Lamal arranged for the tiles to be placed on street corners free of charge at selected locations within the city, included several French Quarter locations, in front of a bank in the New Orleans Central Business District, and at The Pickwick Club, which was a meeting place for the local business community.

By 1893, the blue street name tiles were in wide usage in New Orleans and continued to be until approximately 1950. The installation of the tiles was not an official practice of the local city government even though their use was a common practice. The tiles are for this reason not commonly used on street corners in sections of the city built after 1950. The blue street name tiles continue to be maintained in the older sections of the city. During Lamal's time, he sold the tiles for 5¢ apiece. In contemporary times, the city government mandates that contractors responsible for street and sidewalk repair must reinstall the blue sidewalk tiles. If the tiles are too damaged for further use, the city government requires suitable replacements.

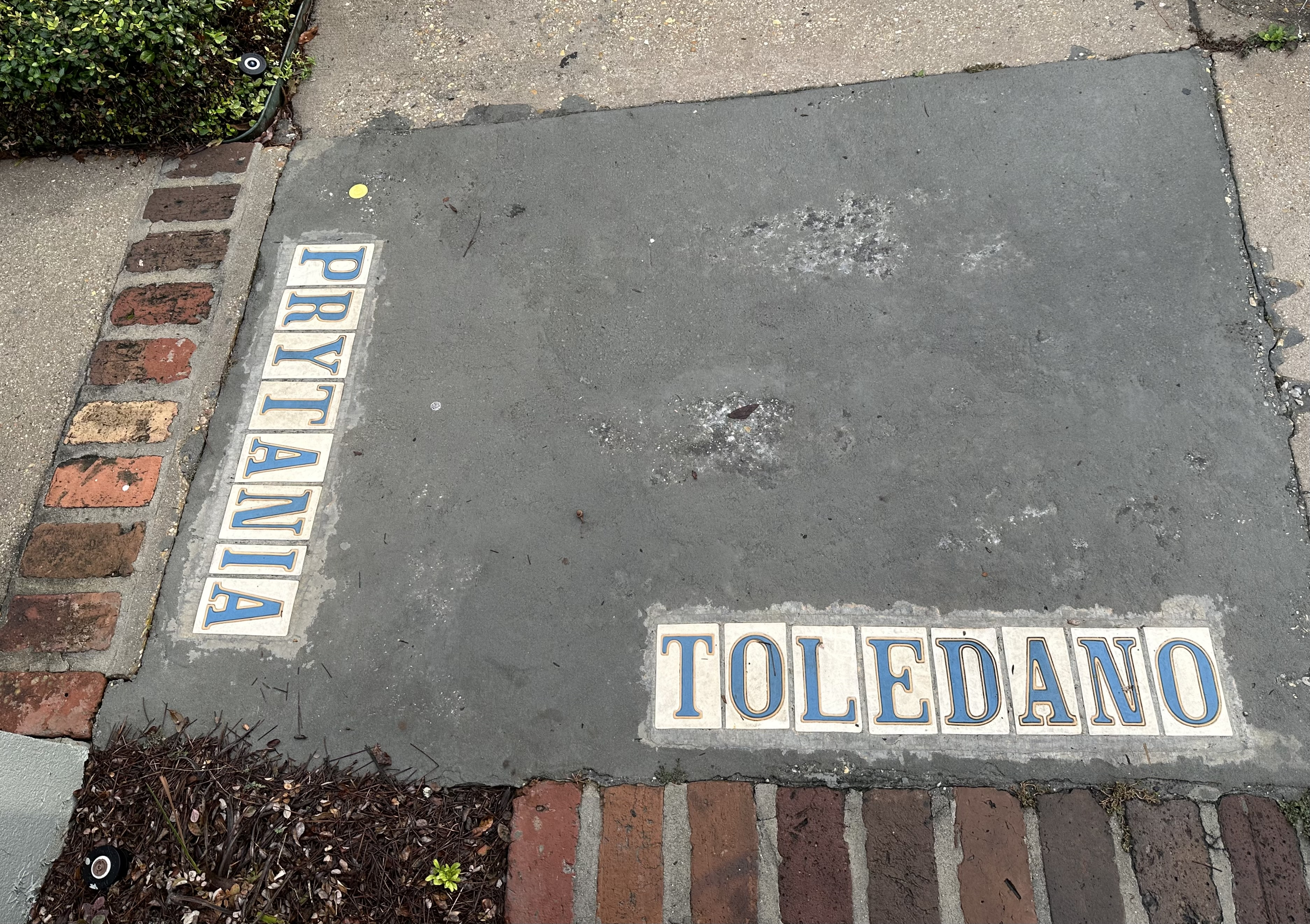
American Encaustic font street name tiles at the intersection of Toledano and Prytania - this type became more common that Lamal's Belgian style fonts

By the 1930s, the blue ceramic street tiles were manufactured domestically, especially by the American Encaustic Tile Company of Zanesville, Ohio. In contemporary times, as the blue ceramic tiles are damaged or otherwise need replacement, the tiles are manufactured by artisans local to the New Orleans metropolitan area. As of 2022, the cost of the replacement tiles was $40 per tile. Many of the newer tiles have yellow pinstripe borders.

In 2022, the Louisiana Landmark Society included the blue street name tiles on its list of Louisiana's most endangered architectural features.

Much of what is known about the history of Lamal and the blue street tiles is through the efforts of local historian Michael Styborski.
