= George A. Hero =

American entrepreneur

George A. Hero (28 July 1854 – 1932) was a New Orleans entrepreneur who organized the drainage of vast tracts of swampland on the West Bank of the Mississippi River at New Orleans. He was known locally as the "Drainage King". and was founder of the Hero Land Company. Later Hero was involved in a project to build a bridge from New Orleans to the West Bank, but this was never completed.

== Early life ==
Hero was born in New Orleans.

== Career ==
As a young man, Hero began working at W.F. Halsey Company, agents for a New York bank. When he was twenty he joined the cotton firm Robinson and Hero, and later owned and operated the business under his own name. In 1889 Lehman, Stern and Company hired him to run its cotton futures department. When the company incorporated in 1896, he became its vice president.

Hero retired from the cotton business in 1912. He owned a derelict plantation on the west bank of the Mississippi River. Canals dug there during the early 19th century in order to grow sugar and cotton had degraded after the Civil War, and the swampy land was almost worthless.

Hero's neighbors showed no interest in pooling their resources to drain the land, so he purchased 10,000 more acres in order to meet the minimum acreage required to petition the Louisiana legislature to create a drainage authority for the two West Bank parishes (counties). He bore all the early expenses by himself.

The Louisiana state government approved the Jefferson-Plaquemines Drainage District, adding to it the West Bank segment of Orleans Parish and appointed Hero president.

Mayor Martin Behrman proclaimed the day the pumps were started, February 13, 1915, as “Hero Day”, and the town lauded him with parades and a banquet. President Woodrow Wilson sent his congratulations.

In 1925 Hero donated land in Belle Chasse next to the Mississippi River for the first commercial airport to serve New Orleans. Suitable for use by land and sea planes, it was named for World War I hero, Alvin Callender and dedicated on November 6, 1926. Exhibition flying entertained the crowds, including dignitaries and aviators such as Howard Hughes. George A. Hero was given a rousing ovation.

In 1928 George Hero and Allen S. Hackett applied for a permit to build a bridge across the Mississippi from Race Street to Gretna. After long negotiations, in 1930 President Herbert Hoover signed a bill approving plans for the War Department to construct a $12,000,000 vehicular toll bridge. The bridge designed by engineer Hackett, was to have separate, but interlaced, up and down spiral ramps to reduce the amount of land needed for the approaches. The Hero-Hackett Bridge design was estimated to save $3,000,000 over bridges with conventional approaches. The center of the span was to be 174’ above the river to allow large ships to pass under.

The bridge was to be erected before 1933, but Hero was struck by an automobile in August 1932. He never fully recovered and died from a stroke on December 19, 1932. In the meantime plans to build the Huey P. Long Bridge further up the river had begun and the Hero-Hackett Bridge was abandoned.

Hero's papers are preserved in the archives of Louisiana State University.

== Personal ==
Hero was married three times: first to Fenella Marie Olivier (20 Nov 1859-27 Dec 1893), second to her sister, Anna Olivier (1873- 26 Dec 26,1913) and third to Claire Joubert de Ville Marest Archinard. He had three children by Fenella: Alfred, Numa and Fenella, and three by Anna: George, Alvin and Claire.
