= Chris Owens (performer) =

American burlesque performer (1932–2022)

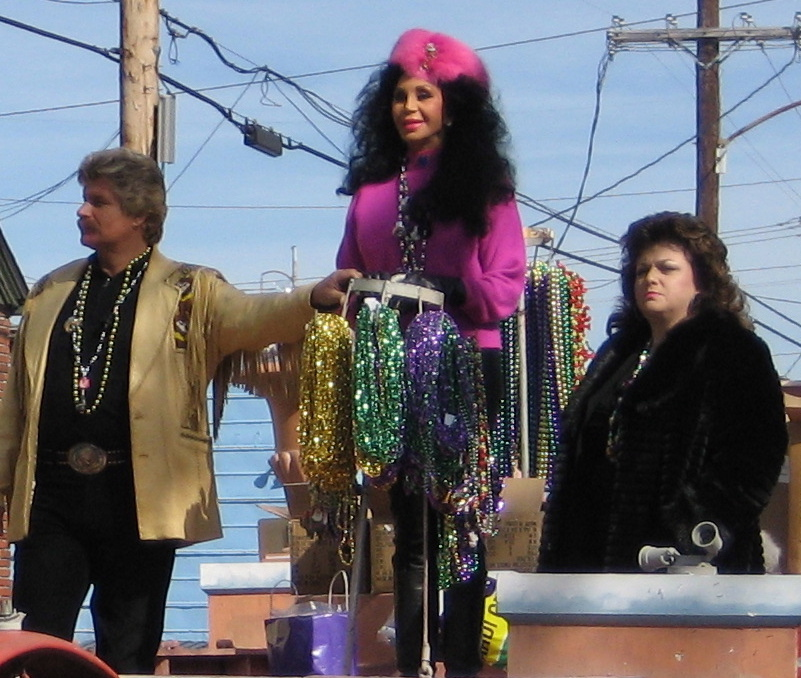
- Chris Owens rides as grand marshal for the Krewe of Shangri-La Mardi Gras parade.
- Born: Christine Joetta Shaw; October 5, 1932; Texas, US
- Died: April 5, 2022 (aged 89); New Orleans, US
- Occupations: Performer; entrepreneur; philanthropist

Chris Owens (October 5, 1932 – April 5, 2022) was an American performer, club owner and entrepreneur who based her act out of the French Quarter of New Orleans, Louisiana, in the United States. She was a French Quarter fixture and celebrity from the start of the 1960s through the early 21st century. Owens was well known in Louisiana and throughout the South. Tourists visiting Bourbon Street could not miss huge posters of her wearing costumes as they walked by her nightclub. Owens was known as "Queen of the Vieux Carré".

== Life and work ==
Owens

Chris Owens was born Christine Joetta Shaw on October 5, 1932, in rural Texas, the daughter of Fred Moore Shaw Sr. and Thelma Leona Martin who married in 1925 in Haskell, Texas. Owens grew up on a farm and went to Texas Wesleyan College (now Texas Wesleyan University) to be a nurse. She married car dealer Sol R. Owens in 1956 and opened a nightclub on St. Louis Street in the French Quarter; it was originally intended to be a low-key sideline establishment, but business exploded. Realizing that Owens' performance numbers were a huge draw, they sold their home in 1977 and purchased the building on the corner of St. Louis and Bourbon. Soon the "Chris Owens Review" became a noted act in town. In 1979, Sol had a heart attack and died; Owens took over management of the club and of the 30 apartments and four shops located within the building.

Owens hosted a yearly Easter Parade that continues to roll throughout the French Quarter.

Owens can be seen in the 1962 film The Wacky World of Doctor Morgus (see Morgus the Magnificent). She began production in 2003 of her first feature film, Let's Ballroom, in which she stars as a wealthy widow who falls in love with her dance instructor.

== Death ==
Chris Owens died of a heart attack on April 5, 2022, in her St. Louis Street apartment, according to her longtime manager Kitsy Adams.

== Honors ==
On April 22, 2006, Owens was inducted into the New Orleans Musical Legends Park with a statue created in her likeness. Her image stands next to others including Fats Domino, Pete Fountain, Allen Toussaint, Irma Thomas, Al Hirt, Ronnie Kole, and Louis Prima.

== Other sources ==
- Foster, Mary (July 21, 2009). "She turns back time on Bourbon Street". The Boston Globe. Boston.
- Matthews, Bunny (February 1, 2004). "Chris Owens". OffBeat Magazine. New Orleans.
- Scott, Mike (November 6, 2017). "1956: Chris Owens becomes a French Quarter sensation". The Times-Picayune. New Orleans.
- McCash, Doug (April 5, 2022). "Chris Owens, dancer, singer, the heart of old Bourbon Street, has died". The Times-Picayune. New Orleans.
