= Joseph Mansion (politician) =

American politician

Joseph Mansion was an American politician. He was a state legislator in Louisiana and served as state tax assessor. He played the violin. He had a cigar store. He was a Republican from Orleans Parish.
