= Jean J. Beaufort =

United States Medal of Honor recipient (1832–1897)

- Born: c. 1832; France
- Died: September 15, 1897 (aged 64–65); Colorado, US
- Burial place: Arlington National Cemetery
- Military career
- Allegiance: United States of America; Union
- Branch: United States Army; Union Army
- Rank: Corporal
- Unit: 2nd Regiment Louisiana Volunteer Infantry (Union)
- Conflicts: American Civil War Siege of Port Hudson
- Awards: Medal of Honor

Jean Joseph Beaufort, (c. 1832 – September 15, 1897) known also as John Joseph Beaufort, was a corporal in the Union Army who was awarded a Medal of Honor for heroic actions during the American Civil War.

== Early life ==
Beaufort was born in 1832 in France. He later immigrated to the United States.

== Later life ==
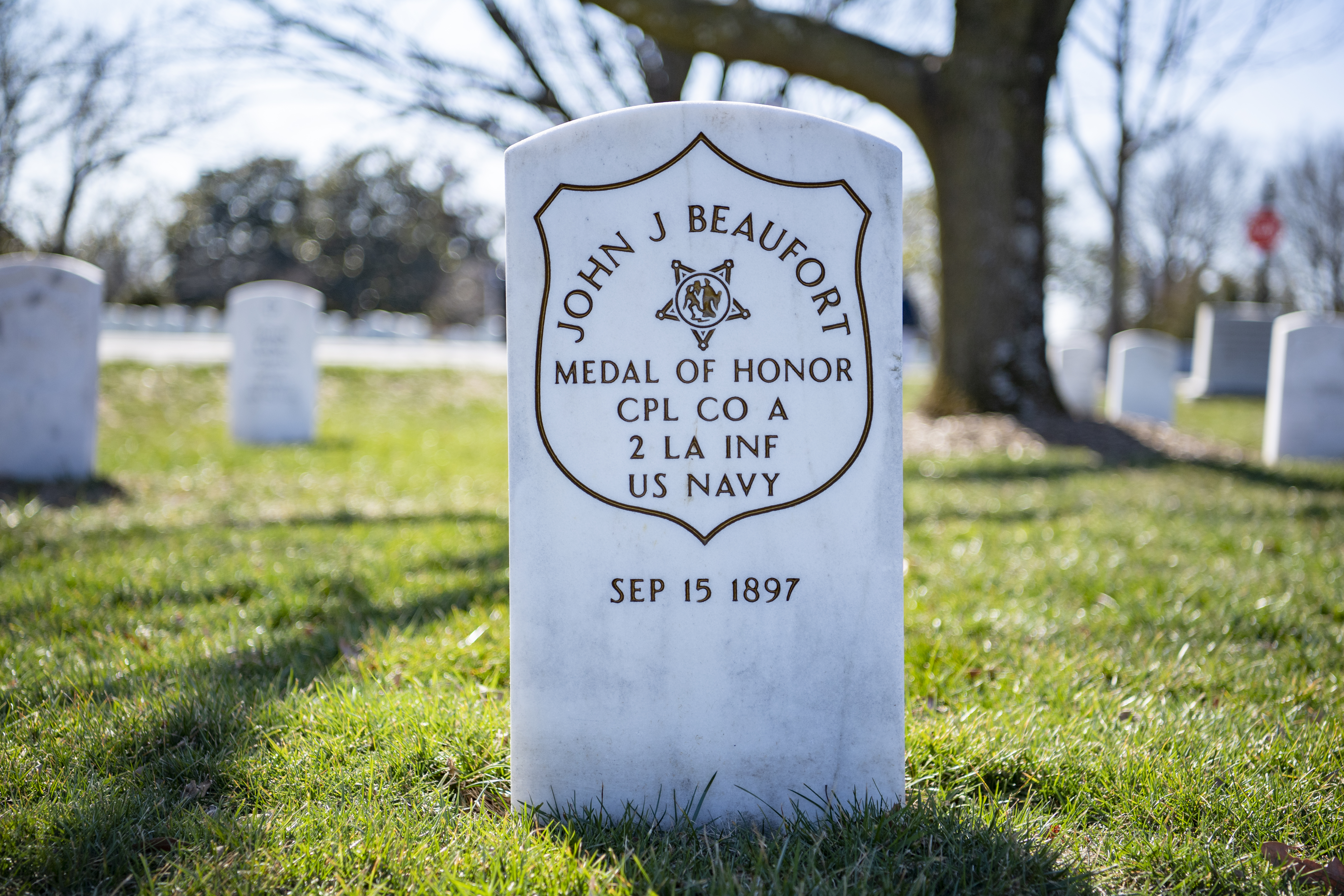
Grave at Arlington National Cemetery, indicating an incorrect branch of service

Beaufort was living in New Orleans, Louisiana when the Civil War broke out. After the Union captured New Orleans, Beaufort volunteered for service in the Union army, joining the 2nd Louisiana Regiment Infantry at around May 20, 1863.

When the 2nd Louisiana Infantry approached Port Hudson, Beaufort volunteered to take a party of eight people behind enemy lines to destroy a signal station; he succeeded, giving the Union a key advantage in the impending Siege of Port Hudson.

Thirty four years later, Beaufort was awarded the Medal of Honor for leading the assault on the signal station. He died some two months later on September 15, 1897, and was buried at Arlington National Cemetery, in Arlington, Virginia.

== See also ==
- List of Medal of Honor recipients
