= New Orleans Jazz Vipers =

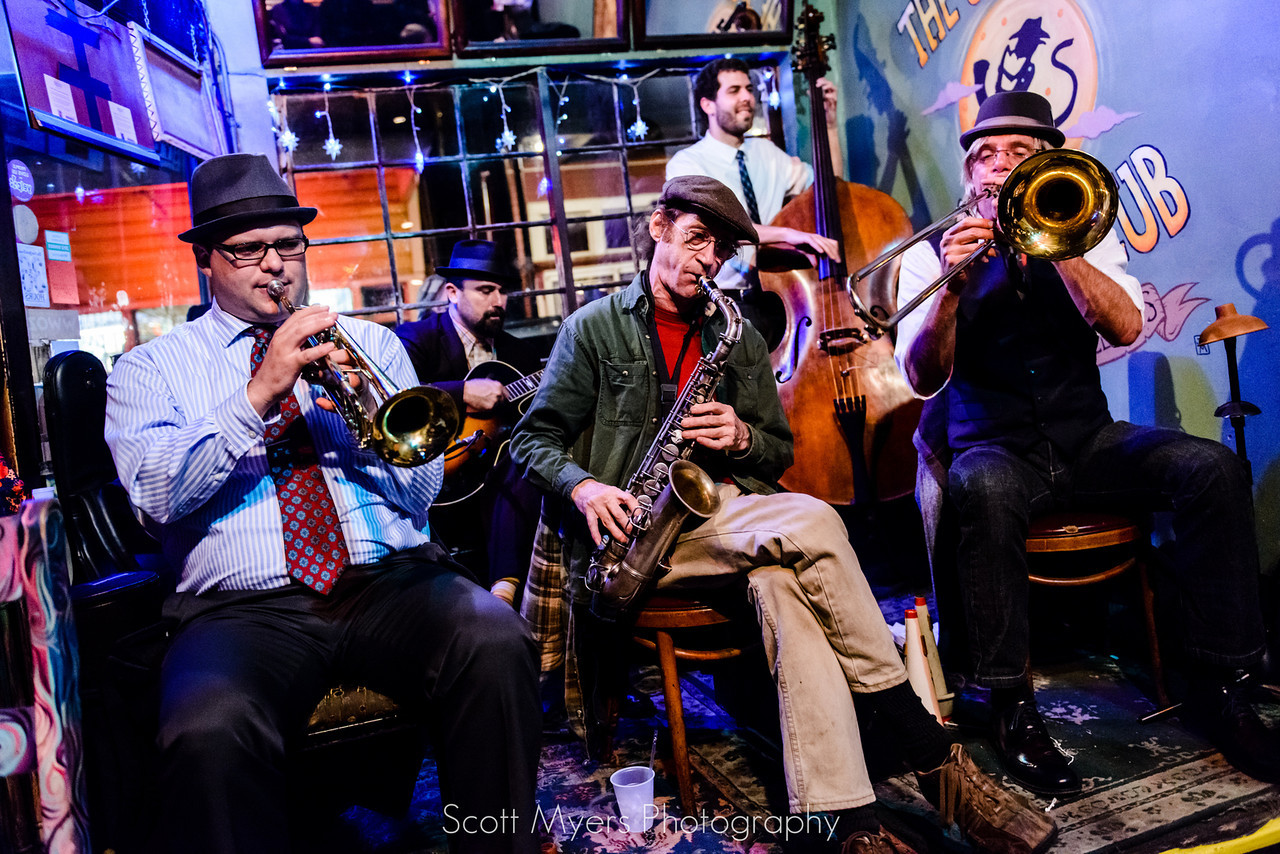
The New Orleans Jazz Vipers at the Spotted Cat Music Club on Frenchmen Street, 2013

The New Orleans Jazz Vipers are a swing band from New Orleans, Louisiana.

== History ==
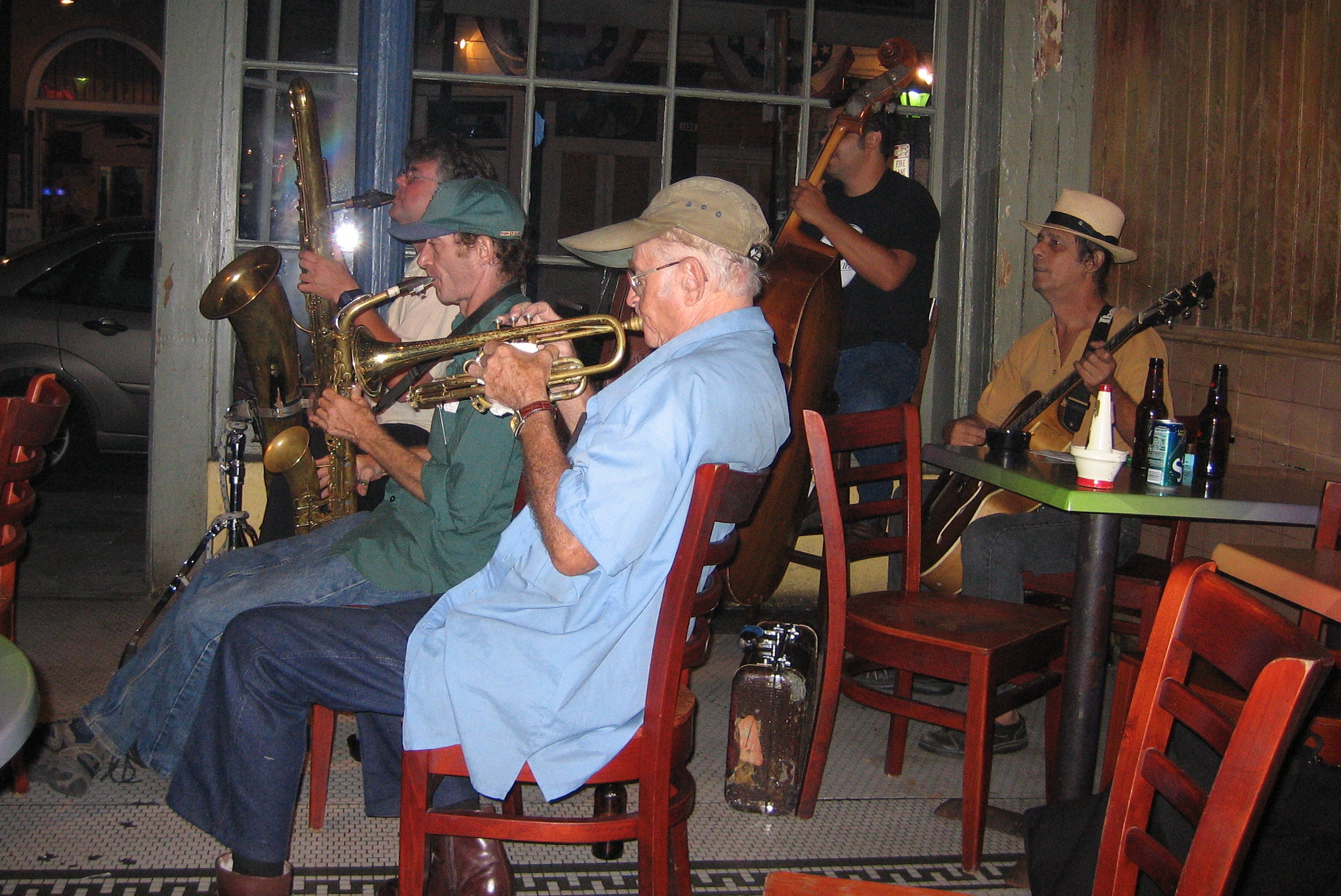
In the aftermath of Hurricane Katrina and the Federal levee failure disaster of 2005, the Vipers were some of the first to bring live music back to New Orleans, before electricity and other services were restored to most of the city.

The New Orleans Jazz Vipers are a swing jazz band that plays music by Billie Holiday, Duke Ellington, Louis Armstrong, Dicky Wells, Benny Carter, and Count Basie, as well as original compositions. The band was founded in 1999 and is led by saxophonist Joe Braun. In 2009, the original Jazz Vipers split into two separate bands.

== Members ==
- Joe Braun – saxophone
- Craig Klein – trombone
- Molly Reeves – guitar
- Earl Bonie – clarinet
- Steve DeTroy – piano
- Mitchell Player – double bass

== Awards and honors ==
- Best of the Beat Award for Best Traditional Jazz Album, Live on Frenchmen Street, Offbeat, 2004
- Best Traditional Jazz Band, Big Easy Awards, 2005

== Discography ==
- The New Orleans Jazz Vipers (2002)
- Live on Frenchmen Street (2004)
- Hope You're Comin' Back (2006)
- Blue Turning Grey (2013)
- Going, Going, Gone (2015)
- Live and Viperizin' (2017)
- Is There A Chance For Me (2020)
