= Mary S. Sherman =

Orthopedic surgeon

- Born: Mary Stults; April 21, 1913; Evanston, Illinois, U.S.
- Died: July 21, 1964 (aged 51); New Orleans, Louisiana, U.S.
- Education: Evanston Township High School Northwestern University University of Chicago
- Occupations: Orthopedic surgeon, cancer researcher
- Spouse: Thomas Watson Sherman

Mary Stults Sherman (April 21, 1913 – July 21, 1964) was an American orthopedic surgeon and cancer researcher affiliated with the University of Chicago and the Ochsner Foundation Hospital in New Orleans. Her unsolved 1964 murder has been tied to conspiracy theories related to the assassination of John F. Kennedy.

== Early life and career ==
Mary Caroline Stults was born in Evanston, Illinois to Walter Allen Stults and Monica Edith Graham, both singers and music educators. She had initially trained in opera, studying in Paris before returning to Evanston and earning degrees in French at Northwestern University. She taught at the University of Illinois French Institute in Paris and then went on to earn her medical degree from the University of Chicago in 1941. She married Dr. Thomas Watson Sherman in 1936.

After graduating from medical school, Sherman served as an associate professor of orthopedic surgery at the University of Chicago during which time she focused her research on bone cancer and polio treatments. In 1949 and 1950, she traveled through Alaska performing medical surveys in remote communities and serving for a time at Mount Edgecumbe hospital on Kruzof Island.

In 1952, Sherman was appointed to the Ochsner Foundation Hospital as director of the Bone Pathology Laboratory and served as orthopedic surgeon in the clinic. She was also an associate professor of clinical orthopedics at Tulane University’s School of Medicine. In 1963 she and a colleague received the Kappa Delta Award for Orthopedic Research for their work studying the causes of clubfoot.

== Publications ==
Sherman was the author or coauthor of numerous articles about bone and joint diseases. As examples, her works included:

- "The pathology of ununited fractures of the neck of the femur"
- "Infantile cortical hyperostosis; review of the literature and report of five cases"
- "The non-specificity of synovial reactions"
- "Mechanism of pain in osteoid osteomas"

== Death ==
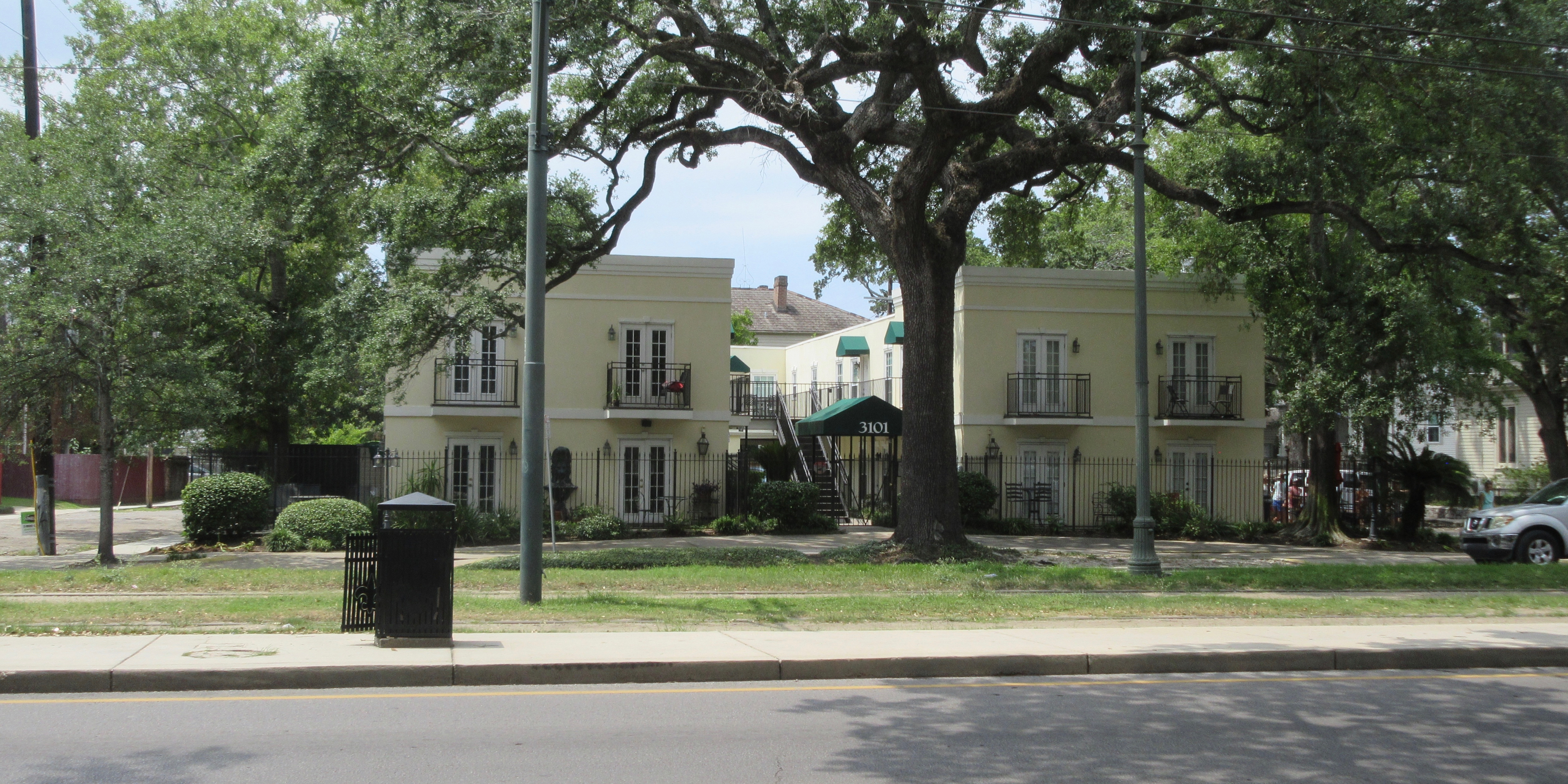
Apartment complex on St. Charles Avenue, New Orleans, where Sherman lived and died

On July 21, 1964, firefighters responding to a call from Sherman's neighbors discovered her body beneath a burning mattress in her apartment on St. Charles Avenue in New Orleans. The coroner classified Sherman's death as a homicide citing lethal stab wounds and severe burns to her upper torso and right arm. Police stated that her purse was missing and somebody had attempted to pry open a jewelry box on the premises. Her car was discovered hours later, abandoned on a city street several blocks from the crime scene.

== In popular culture ==
Edward Haslam wrote a book about Dr. Sherman titled Dr. Mary's Monkey (2007)
