= Tulane Green Wave track and field =

College track and field team

- University: Tulane University
- Head coach: Adrian Myers
- Conference: The American
- Location: New Orleans, Louisiana
- Outdoor track: Danny Thiel Track
- Nickname: Green Wave
- Colors: Olive green and sky blue

The Tulane Green Wave track and field team is the track and field program that represents Tulane University. The Green Wave compete in NCAA Division I as a member of the American Conference. The team is based in New Orleans, Louisiana at the Danny Thiel Track.

The program is coached by Adrian Myers. The track and field program officially encompasses four teams, as the NCAA regards men's and women's indoor track and field and outdoor track and field as separate sports.

Gloria Asumnu and Tharushi Karunarathna, both runners, are the only athletes that have represented Tulane at the Olympics, however Tulane sprinter Herman Neugass qualified for the 1936 Summer Olympics but refused to compete.

== Postseason ==
As of 2024, a total of 12 men and 10 women have achieved individual first-team All-American status at the men's outdoor, women's outdoor, men's indoor, or women's indoor national championships.

First team All-Americans
Team	Championships	Name	Event	Place	Ref.
Men's	1926 Outdoor	William Duren	110 meters hurdles	5th	
Men's	1931 Outdoor	Don Zimmermann	Pole vault	4th	
Men's	1932 Outdoor	Don Zimmermann	Pole vault	2nd	
Men's	1933 Outdoor	Don Zimmermann	Pole vault	5th	
Men's	1934 Outdoor	Herman Neugass	100 meters	8th	
Men's	1935 Outdoor	Herman Neugass	100 meters	4th	
Men's	1935 Outdoor	Herman Neugass	200 meters	3rd	
Men's	1939 Outdoor	Willard White	Discus throw	4th	
Men's	1948 Outdoor	Paul Bienz	100 meters	4th	
Men's	1948 Outdoor	Paul Bienz	200 meters	3rd	
Men's	1948 Outdoor	Spencer Johnson	10,000 meters	6th	
Men's	1949 Outdoor	Paul Bienz	100 meters	4th	
Men's	1949 Outdoor	Paul Bienz	200 meters	3rd	
Men's	1950 Outdoor	Paul Bienz	100 meters	3rd	
Men's	1950 Outdoor	Paul Bienz	200 meters	3rd	
Men's	1954 Outdoor	Frank Dalferes	Javelin throw	8th	
Men's	1965 Outdoor	Bill Shapiro	400 meters	6th	
Men's	1967 Indoor	Gary Groff	Long jump	5th	
Men's	1997 Indoor	John Dessoye	200 meters	4th	
Women's	1997 Indoor	Nadia Smith	High jump	6th	
Women's	1998 Indoor	Hanne Lyngstad	Mile run	6th	
Women's	1998 Outdoor	Hanne Lyngstad	1500 meters	4th	
Women's	1999 Indoor	Hanne Lyngstad	Mile run	3rd	
Women's	1999 Indoor	Hanne Lyngstad	Distance medley relay	3rd	
Women's	1999 Indoor	Lana Garner	Distance medley relay	3rd	
Women's	1999 Indoor	Katrina Gemmell	Distance medley relay	3rd	
Women's	1999 Indoor	Alison Lambert	Distance medley relay	3rd	
Women's	1999 Outdoor	Hanne Lyngstad	1500 meters	3rd	
Men's	2000 Outdoor	Solomon Kandie	3000 meters steeplechase	3rd	
Women's	2001 Indoor	Nadja Petersen	400 meters	7th	
Women's	2001 Indoor	Marie Ahlander	Triple jump	6th	
Men's	2001 Outdoor	Solomon Kandie	3000 meters steeplechase	8th	
Men's	2001 Outdoor	Nathan Junius	Javelin throw	3rd	
Men's	2002 Outdoor	Solomon Kandie	3000 meters steeplechase	3rd	
Women's	2007 Indoor	Gloria Asumnu	60 meters	4th	
Women's	2007 Outdoor	Gloria Asumnu	200 meters	8th	
Women's	2007 Outdoor	Alex Becker	5000 meters	7th	
Women's	2008 Indoor	Gloria Asumnu	60 meters	7th	
Women's	2009 Outdoor	Alex Becker	5000 meters	6th	
Women's	2009 Outdoor	Alex Becker	10,000 meters	5th	
Women's	2011 Outdoor	Ana Ruzevic	Javelin throw	4th	
Women's	2016 Outdoor	Jasmine Blocker	400 meters	7th	
Women's	2017 Outdoor	Alyssa Applebee	Pole vault	7th	
Women's	2023 Indoor	Kristen O'Handley	Pentathlon	7th	

== See also ==
- Category:Tulane Green Wave men's track and field athletes (5)
- Category:Tulane Green Wave women's track and field athletes (4)
