= Cara Salsberry =

American Track and Field Athlete

Personal information
- Full name: Cara Mia Salsberry
- Born: Boca Raton, Florida, U.S.

Sport
- Sport: Track and Field
- Events: Hammer throw, Discus Throw, Weight Throw, Shot Put
- College team: Harvard Crimson (2021–2025); Tulane Green Wave (2025–present)

Achievements and titles
- Personal bests: Hammer throw: 59.87 m Discus throw: 51.75 m Weight throw: 19.08 m Shot put: 12.93 m

Cara Salsberry is an American Track and Field athlete specializing in throwing events, primarily the hammer throw, discus throw, weight throw, and shot put. She competed for Harvard University as an undergraduate and transferred to Tulane University as a graduate student.

== Early life and high school career ==
Salsberry was born in Boca Raton, Florida, and raised in Boynton Beach, Florida, and attended Somerset Academy Canyons.

Her personal bests included a discus throw of 160 feet 5 inches (48.895m) and shot put of 44 feet 3 inches (13.52m). She won the 2021 FHSAA Class 3A state championship in discus, placed second in shot put, and earned multiple medals at state meets. She competed for the Broward Elite Track Club and received recruitment offers from over 30 schools before committing to Harvard in 2021.

== Collegiate career ==
=== Harvard University (2021–2025) ===
Salsberry competed for the Harvard Crimson track and field team. She made her debut in the 2021–22 season. In her sophomore year (2022–23), she achieved personal bests, including 19.08 m in the weight throw placing third at the indoor Conference Championships, 59.79 m in hammer throw, qualified for NCAA East Regionals, and scored at Ivy League championships. She had limited participation in the 2023–24 season and competed selectively in later years.

=== Tulane University (2025–present) ===
As a graduate transfer, Salsberry joined the Tulane Green Wave for the 2025–26 season. She debuted at the Birmingham Icebreaker in December 2025, placing third in the weight throw with 17.19 m. She competed at the Tom Tellez Invitational placing first in the hammer throw with a personal best 59.54 m followed up by at the American Athletic Conference 2026 Outdoor Track & Field Championships scoring placing third in both hammer and discus with a personal best 51.75 m. Both personal bests in hammer and discus qualifying for NCAA East Regionals. NCAA Division I East First Rounds she had another personal best of 59.87 m in hammer.

== Personal bests ==
Event	Mark
Hammer throw	59.87 m
Discus throw	51.75 m
Weight throw	19.08 m

(Collegiate marks as of May 2026)
