= English Turn Golf and Country Club =

Golf club in New Orleans, Louisiana

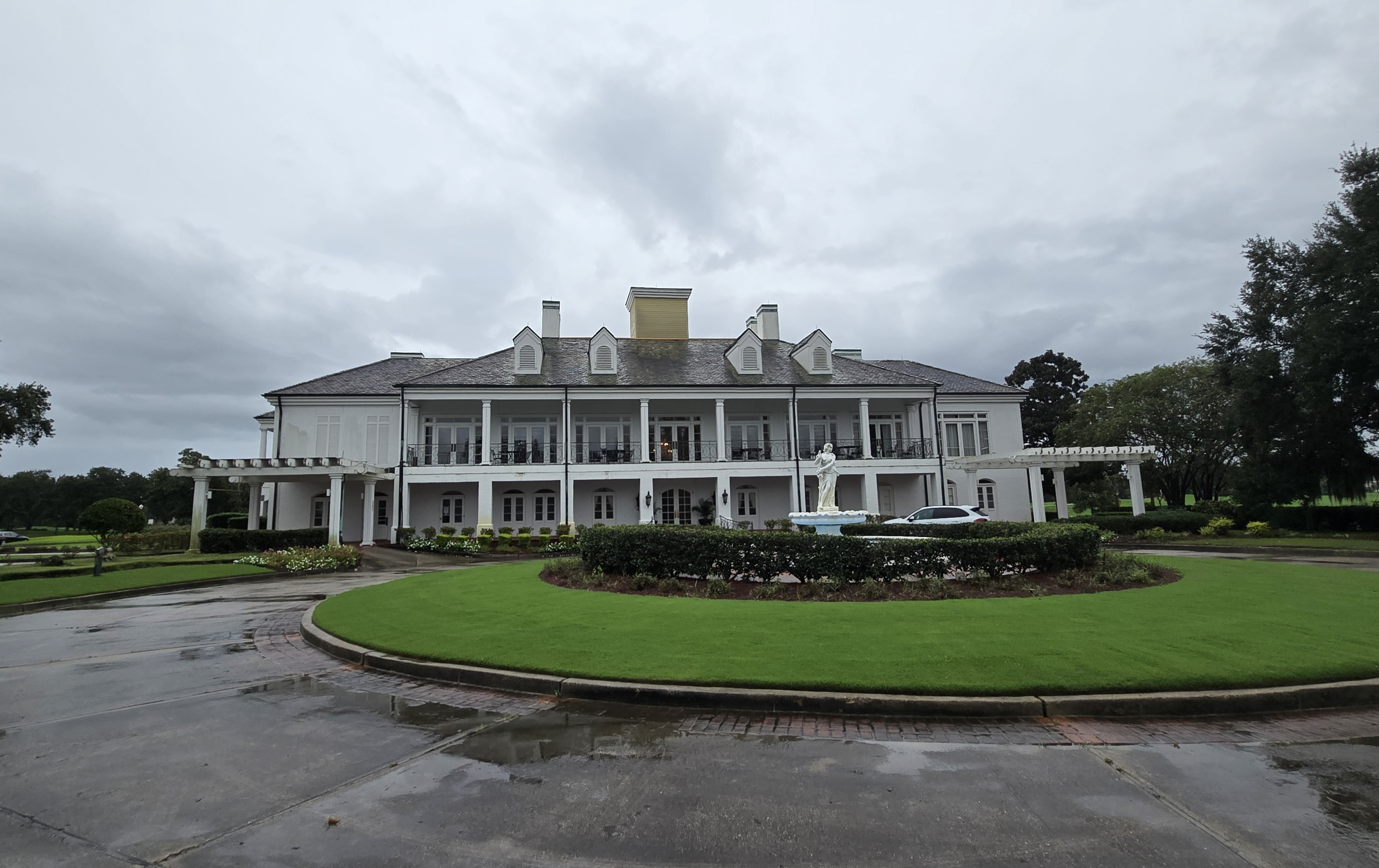
- English Turn Golf and Country Club clubhouse

- Location within the United States Location within Louisiana
- 29.906°N 89.955°W

Club information
- Location: New Orleans, Louisiana, U.S.
- Elevation: Sea level
- Established: 1988; 38 years ago
- Type: Private
- Tota holes: 18
- Tournaments: New Orleans PGA Tour event (1989–2004, 2006); American Jr Golf Assoc New Orleans event Sugar Bowl Intercollegiate Golf Championship
- Website: englishturn.com
- Designed by: Jack Nicklaus
- Par: 72
- Length: 7,078 yards (6,472 m)
- Course rating: 75.0
- Slope rating: 142

The English Turn Golf and Country Club is a private golf course and country club in the southeastern United States, located in the neighbourhood of English Turn in New Orleans, Louisiana. Formerly a venue of the PGA Tour, the par-72 championship course measures 7,078 yards (6,472 m) from the back tees. It is the home course for the Tulane Green Wave and the New Orleans Privateers college golf teams.

== Course History ==
Sitting at the southeast of downtown New Orleans, the golf course was designed by Jack Nicklaus for the New Orleans PGA Tour event and opened in 1988. The event, previously held at Lakewood Country Club, was played at English Turn for sixteen editions (1989–2004), then moved west to TPC Louisiana in 2005. Damage to the course by Hurricane Katrina in August of 2005 caused a one-year return in 2006.

For the first edition in 1989, the course was set at 7,106 yards (6,498 m) and the winner's share was $135,000; Tim Simpson was the champion, two strokes ahead of runners-up Greg Norman and Hal Sutton.

== Tournaments ==
=== PGA Tour ===
The tour event at English Turn went by many names:

- USF&G Classic (1989–1991)
- Freeport-McMoRan Golf Classic (1992–1993)
- Freeport-McMoRan Classic (1994–1995)
- Freeport-McDermott Classic (1996–1998)
- Compaq Classic of New Orleans (1999–2002)
- HP Classic of New Orleans (2003–2004)
- Zurich Classic of New Orleans (2006)

=== American Junior Golf Association ===
- American Junior Golf Association's New Orleans event (1989–2003)

=== College ===
- Sugar Bowl Intercollegiate Golf Championship (2010–present)
  (Tulane Green Wave golf annual home meet)

== Club Facilities ==
The venue offers chipping and putting practice areas. The facility also has six tennis courts and a junior Olympic-size pool used as the home of a swim team.

== Gallery ==
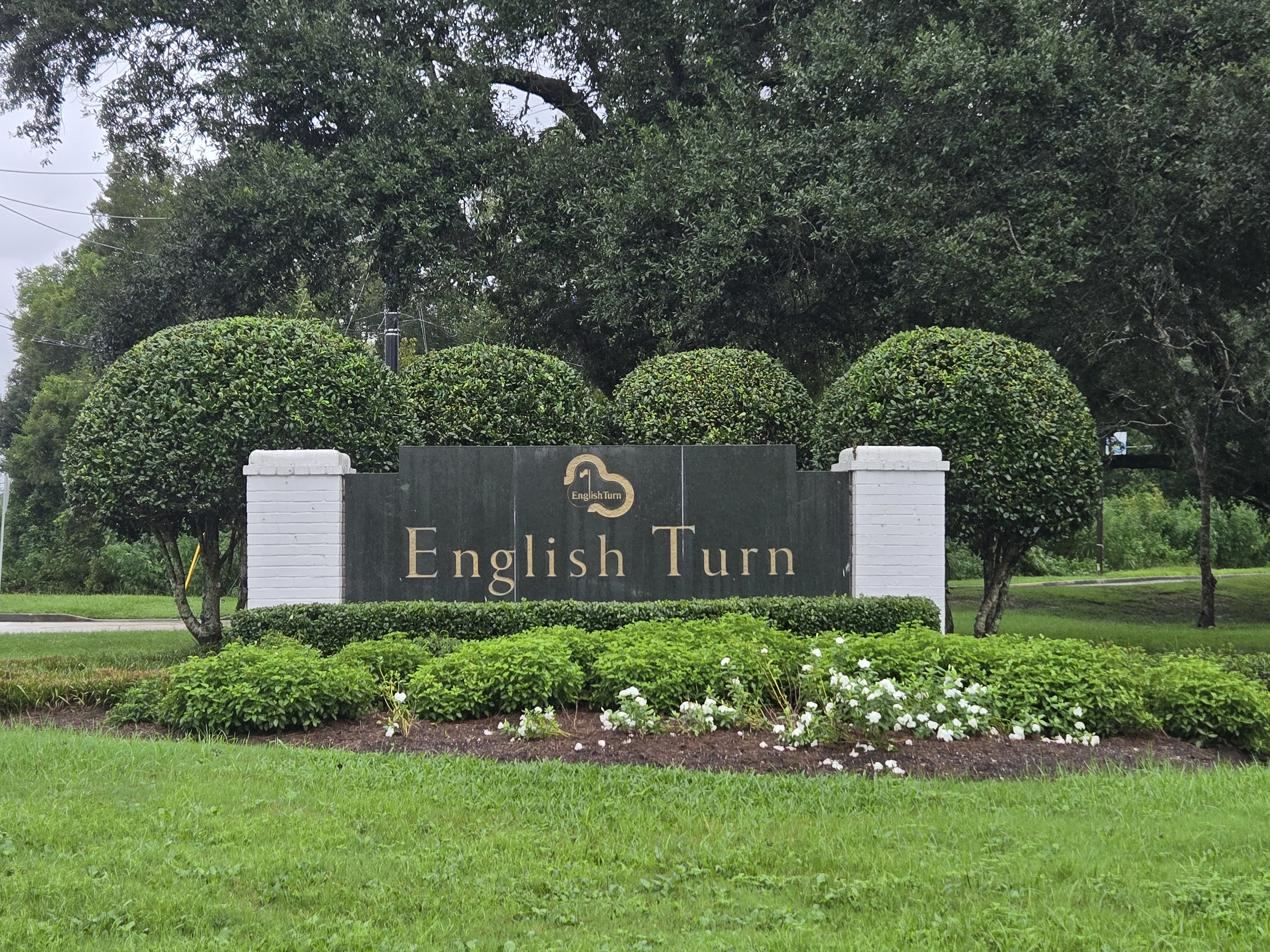
English Turn sign

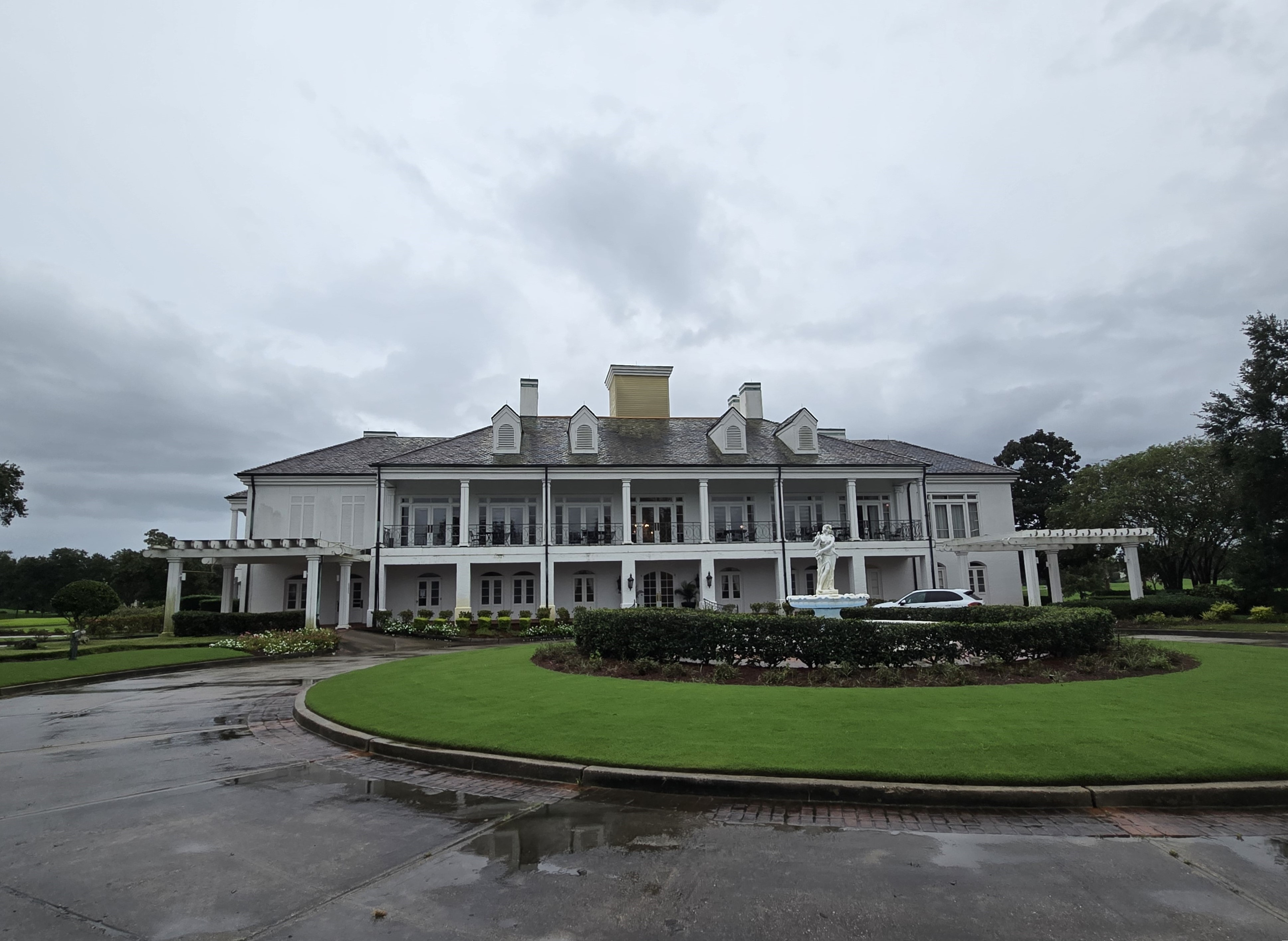
English Turn clubhouse

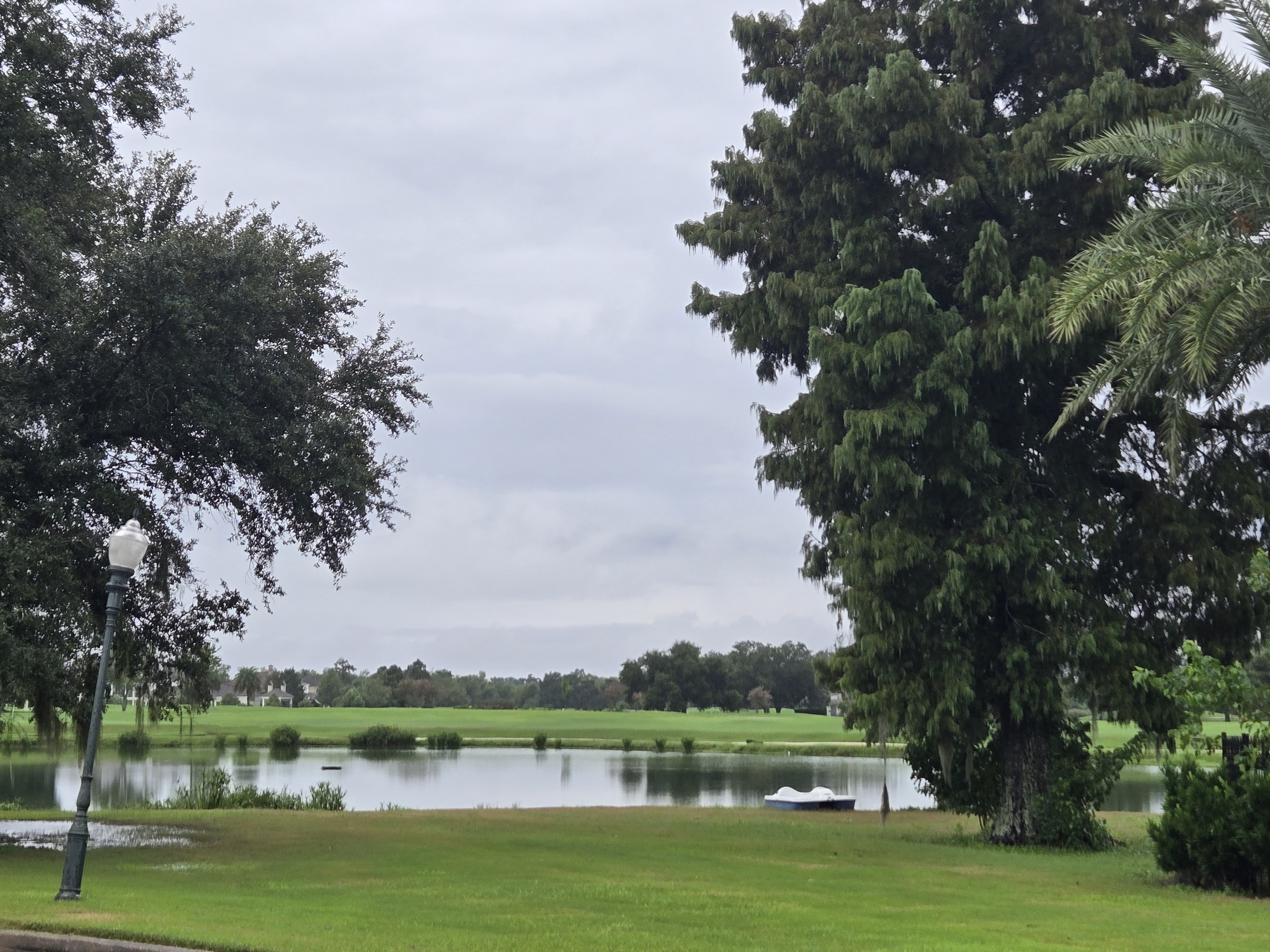
English Turn golf course and pond

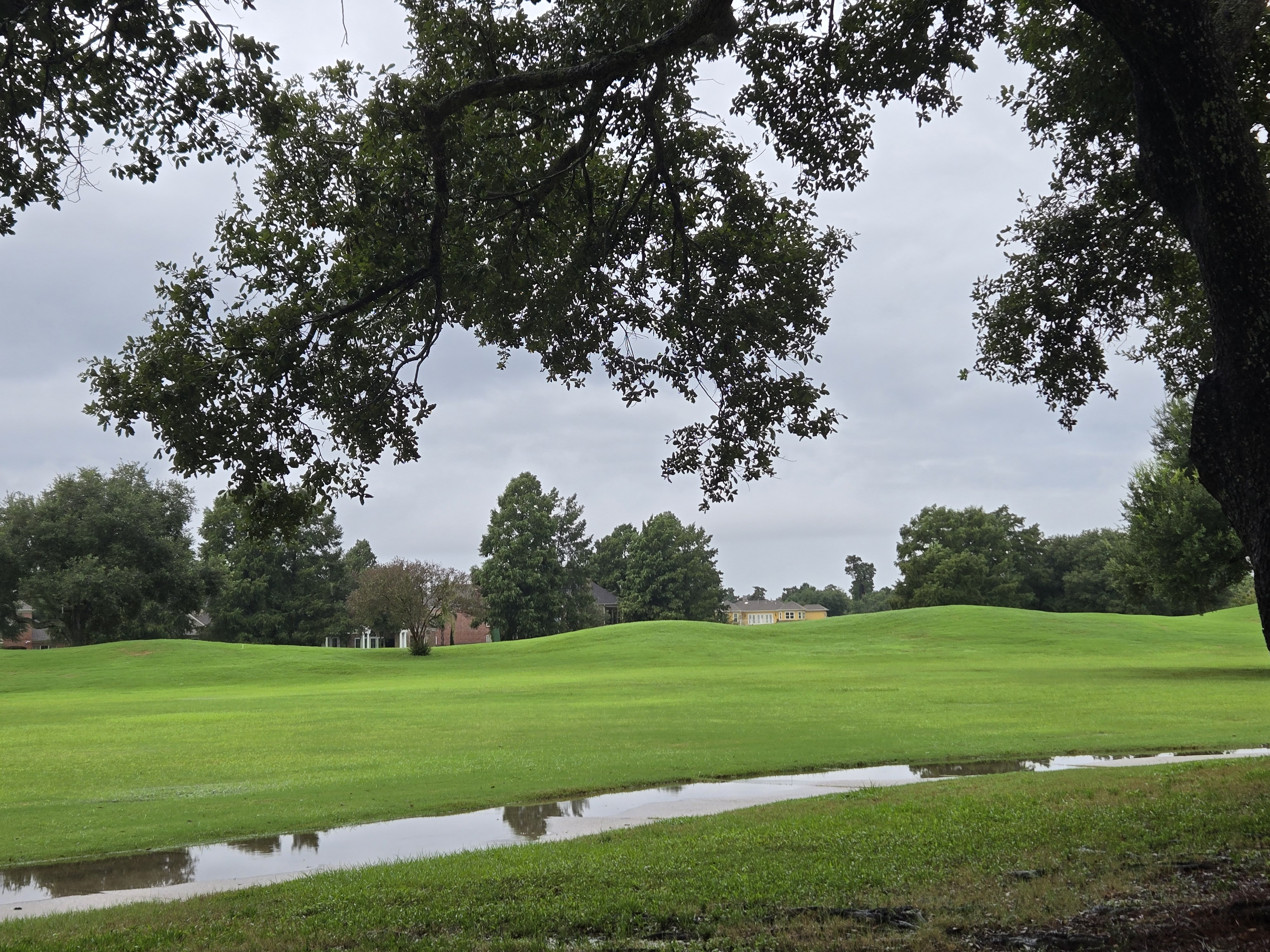
English Turn golf course

== See also ==
- Zurich Classic of New Orleans
- Tulane Green Wave
- New Orleans Privateers
