= Southern (Spring) Open =

Golf tournament formerly on the PGA Tour

Coordinates: 29°58′41.1″N 90°7′4.3″W

The Southern (Spring) Open was a golf tournament on the PGA Tour, played only in 1922 at the New Orleans Country Club in New Orleans, Louisiana. Gene Sarazen won the event with a four-round total of 294 (+10), beating Leo Diegel by eight strokes. It was Sarazen's first PGA Tour win.

== See also ==
- Zurich Classic of New Orleans, the later PGA Tour event held in New Orleans
