= Zurich Classic of New Orleans =

Golf tournament held in New Orleans, Louisiana, US

Coordinates: 29.902°N 90.190°W

Tournament information
- Location: Avondale, Louisiana
- Established: 1938
- Course: TPC Louisiana
- Par: 72
- Length: 7,425 yards (6,789 m)
- Organized by: Fore!Kids Foundation
- Tour: PGA Tour
- Format: Team stroke play
- Prize fund: US$9,500,000
- Month played: April
- Website: zurichgolfclassic.com

Tournament record score
- Aggregate: Individual: 262 Chip Beck (1988); Team: 257 Alex Fitzpatrick and Matt Fitzpatrick (2026)
- To par: Individual: −26 as above Team: −31 as above

Current champion
- (England) Alex Fitzpatrick and (England) Matt Fitzpatrick

Location map
- Location in the United States Location in Louisiana

The Zurich Classic of New Orleans is a professional golf tournament in Louisiana on the PGA Tour, currently held at TPC Louisiana in Avondale, a suburb southwest of New Orleans. Beginning 88 years ago in 1938 and held annually since 1958, it is commonly played in early to mid-spring. Zurich Insurance Group is the main sponsor, and it is organized by the Fore!Kids Foundation.

First prize reached five figures in 1965, six figures in 1988, and passed the million-dollar mark in 2006. The winning team in 2022 split over $2.39 million.

In 2017, the Zurich Classic became a team event, with eighty pairs. One member of each team is initially chosen via the Tour priority rankings, and his partner must either be a PGA Tour member or earn entry through a sponsor exemption. The stroke play format was alternate shot (foursome) in the first and third rounds and better ball (fourball) for the second and fourth rounds. The cut line is 33 teams, plus ties. The winners earn 400 FedEx Cup points and two-year exemptions, but will not receive Masters invitations and no world ranking points are awarded for the event.

In 2018, the format switched to fourball for the first and third rounds and alternate shot for the second and fourth rounds.

== Tournament names and corporate sponsors ==
- Crescent City Open (1938)
- New Orleans Open (1939–1948)
- Greater New Orleans Open Invitational (1958–1971)
- Greater New Orleans Invitational (1972–1974)
- First NBC New Orleans Open (1975–1979)
- Greater New Orleans Open (1980)
- USF&G New Orleans Open (1981)
- USF&G Classic (1982–1991)
- Freeport-McMoRan Golf Classic (1992–1993)
- Freeport-McMoRan Classic (1994–1995)
- Freeport- McDermott Classic (1996–1998)
- Compaq Classic of New Orleans (1999–2002)
- HP Classic of New Orleans (2003–2004)
- Zurich Classic of New Orleans (2005–present)

== Tournament highlights ==
- 1966: Frank Beard wins his first New Orleans title by two shots over Gardner Dickinson. The win by Beard came two years after his being diagnosed with and almost dying of encephalitis shortly after playing in the 1964 Greater New Orleans Open Invitational.
- 1972: PGA Tour rookie Rogelio Gonzales was disqualified after it was learned he had changed his scorecard earlier in the tournament. In addition to his disqualification, the PGA Tour lifted Gonzales playing privileges.
- 1974: Lee Trevino wins with a bogey-free four rounds, a rare occurrence.
- 1975: Billy Casper wins for the 51st and ultimately last time on the PGA Tour. He beats Peter Oosterhuis by two shots.
- 1978: Lon Hinkle earns his first ever PGA Tour title by birdieing the 72nd hole to beat Fuzzy Zoeller and Gibby Gilbert by one shot. The win by Hinkle ends Gary Player's consecutive tournament winning streak at three.
- 1984: Mac O'Grady gets into an altercation with a female tournament volunteer. Two years later, he was fined and suspended by Tour Commissioner Deane Beman for conduct unbecoming a professional golfer.
- 1990: David Frost beats Greg Norman by one shot after holing out from a sand trap on the 72nd hole.
- 1995: In need of a win to qualify for The Masters, Davis Love III defeats Mike Heinen in a sudden death playoff.
- 1999: Carlos Franco becomes the first South American to win on the PGA Tour since Roberto De Vicenzo at the 1968 Houston Champions International. Franco wins by two shots over Steve Flesch and Harrison Frazar.
- 2002: K. J. Choi becomes the first Korean born golfer to win on the PGA Tour. He beats Dudley Hart and Geoff Ogilvy by four shots.
- 2004: Vijay Singh shoots a final round 63 to beat Phil Mickelson and Joe Ogilvie by one shot.
- 2017: The event switched to a team format.

== Courses ==
From the event's inception through 2004, it was played at a series of courses in New Orleans, starting at the City Park Golf Courses, where it was played through 1962. From 1963 through 1988, the event had a lengthy relationship with Lakewood Country Club before shifting to English Turn Golf and Country Club in 1989 for sixteen editions through 2004.

TPC Louisiana in Avondale became the host in 2005, but damage to the course by Hurricane Katrina that August forced the event back to English Turn for a year in 2006. It returned to the TPC in 2007, its current home.

== Course layout ==
TPC Louisiana in 2016

Hole	1	2	3	4	5	6	7	8	9	Out	10	11	12	13	14	15	16	17	18	In	Total
Yards	399	548	221	482	438	476	561	372	207	3,704	390	575	492	403	216	490	355	215	585	3,721	7,425
Par	4	5	3	4	4	4	5	4	3	36	4	5	4	4	3	4	4	3	5	36	72

== Winners ==
Year	Winner(s) (Note: From 2017 onwards, the Zurich Classic of New Orleans became a two-player team event.)	Score	To par	Margin of victory	Runner(s)-up	Purse (US$)	Winner's share ($)	Ref.
Zurich Classic of New Orleans
2026	(England) Alex Fitzpatrick and (England) Matt Fitzpatrick	257	−31	1 stroke	(Norway) Kristoffer Reitan and (Norway) Kristoffer Ventura (United States) Alex Smalley and (United States) Hayden Springer	9,500,000	1,434,500 (each)	
2025	(United States) Ben Griffin and (United States) Andrew Novak	260	−28	1 stroke	(Denmark) Nicolai Højgaard and (Denmark) Rasmus Højgaard	9,200,000	1,392,000 (each)	
2024	(Republic of Ireland) Shane Lowry and (Northern Ireland) Rory McIlroy	263	−25	Playoff	(United States) Chad Ramey and (France) Martin Trainer	8,900,000	1,286,050 (each)	
2023	(United States) Nick Hardy and (United States) Davis Riley	258	−30	2 strokes	(Canada) Adam Hadwin and (Canada) Nick Taylor	8,600,000	1,242,700 (each)	
2022	(United States) Patrick Cantlay and (United States) Xander Schauffele	259	−29	2 strokes	(United States) Sam Burns and (United States) Billy Horschel	8,300,000	1,199,350 (each)	
2021	(Australia) Marc Leishman and (Australia) Cameron Smith (2)	268	−20	Playoff	(South Africa) Louis Oosthuizen and (South Africa) Charl Schwartzel	7,400,000	1,069,300 (each)	
2020	Canceled due to the COVID-19 pandemic							
2019	(United States) Ryan Palmer and (Spain) Jon Rahm	262	−26	3 strokes	(England) Tommy Fleetwood and (Spain) Sergio García	7,300,000	1,051,200 (each)	
2018	(United States) Billy Horschel (2) and (United States) Scott Piercy	266	−22	1 stroke	(United States) Jason Dufner and (United States) Pat Perez	7,200,000	1,036,800 (each)	
2017	(Sweden) Jonas Blixt and (Australia) Cameron Smith	261	−27	Playoff	(United States) Scott Brown and (United States) Kevin Kisner	7,100,000	1,022,400 (each)	
2016	(United States) Brian Stuard	201 (Note: Shortened to 54 holes due to weather.)	−15	Playoff	(South Korea) An Byeong-hun (United States) Jamie Lovemark	7,000,000	1,260,000	
2015	(England) Justin Rose	266	−22	1 stroke	(United States) Cameron Tringale	6,900,000	1,242,000	
2014	(South Korea) Noh Seung-yul	269	−19	2 strokes	(United States) Robert Streb (United States) Andrew Svoboda	6,800,000	1,224,000	
2013	(United States) Billy Horschel	268	−20	1 stroke	(United States) D. A. Points	6,600,000	1,188,000	
2012	(United States) Jason Dufner	269	−19	Playoff	(South Africa) Ernie Els	6,400,000	1,152,000	
2011	(United States) Bubba Watson	273	−15	Playoff	(United States) Webb Simpson	6,400,000	1,152,000	
2010	(United States) Jason Bohn	270	−18	2 strokes	(United States) Jeff Overton	6,400,000	1,152,000	
2009	(United States) Jerry Kelly	274	−14	1 stroke	(United States) Charles Howell III (South Africa) Rory Sabbatini (South Korea) Charlie Wi	6,300,000	1,134,000	
2008	(Argentina) Andrés Romero	275	−13	1 stroke	(Australia) Peter Lonard	6,200,000	1,116,000	
2007	(United States) Nick Watney	273	−15	3 strokes	(United States) Ken Duke	6,100,000	1,098,000	
2006	(United States) Chris Couch	269	−19	1 stroke	(United States) Fred Funk (United States) Charles Howell III	6,000,000	1,080,000	
2005	(United States) Tim Petrovic	275	−13	Playoff	(United States) James Driscoll	5,500,000	990,000	
HP Classic of New Orleans
2004	(Fiji) Vijay Singh	266	−22	1 stroke	(United States) Phil Mickelson (United States) Joe Ogilvie	5,100,000	918,000	
2003	(United States) Steve Flesch	267	−21	Playoff	(United States) Bob Estes	5,000,000	900,000	
Compaq Classic of New Orleans
2002	(South Korea) K. J. Choi	271	−17	4 strokes	(United States) Dudley Hart (Australia) Geoff Ogilvy	4,500,000	810,000	
2001	(United States) David Toms	266	−22	2 strokes	(United States) Phil Mickelson	4,000,000	720,000	
2000	(Paraguay) Carlos Franco (2)	270	−18	Playoff	(United States) Blaine McCallister	3,400,000	612,000	
1999	(Paraguay) Carlos Franco	269	−19	2 strokes	(United States) Steve Flesch (United States) Harrison Frazar	2,600,000	468,000	
Freeport-McDermott Classic
1998	(England) Lee Westwood	273	−15	3 strokes	(United States) Steve Flesch	1,700,000	306,000	
1997	(United States) Brad Faxon	272	−16	3 strokes	(United States) Bill Glasson (Sweden) Jesper Parnevik	1,500,000	270,000	
1996	(United States) Scott McCarron	275	−13	5 strokes	(United States) Tom Watson	1,200,000	216,000	
Freeport-McMoRan Classic
1995	(United States) Davis Love III	274	−14	Playoff	(United States) Mike Heinen	1,200,000	216,000	
1994	(United States) Ben Crenshaw (2)	273	−15	3 strokes	(Spain) José María Olazábal	1,200,000	216,000	
Freeport-McMoRan Golf Classic
1993	(United States) Mike Standly	281	−7	1 stroke	(United States) Russ Cochran (United States) Payne Stewart	1,000,000	180,000	
1992	(United States) Chip Beck (2)	276	−12	1 stroke	(Australia) Greg Norman (United States) Mike Standly	1,000,000	180,000	
USF&G Classic
1991	(Wales) Ian Woosnam	275	−13	Playoff	(United States) Jim Hallet	1,000,000	180,000	
1990	(South Africa) David Frost	276	−12	1 stroke	(Australia) Greg Norman	1,000,000	180,000	
1989	(United States) Tim Simpson	274	−14	2 strokes	(Australia) Greg Norman (United States) Hal Sutton	750,000	135,000	
1988	(United States) Chip Beck	262	−26	7 strokes	(United States) Lanny Wadkins	750,000	135,000	
1987	(United States) Ben Crenshaw	268	−20	3 strokes	(United States) Curtis Strange	500,000	90,000	
1986	(United States) Calvin Peete	269	−19	5 strokes	(United States) Pat McGowan	500,000	90,000	
1985	(Spain) Seve Ballesteros	205	−11	2 strokes	(United States) Peter Jacobsen (United States) John Mahaffey	400,000	72,000	
1984	(United States) Bob Eastwood	272	−16	3 strokes	(United States) Larry Rinker	400,000	72,000	
1983	(United States) Bill Rogers	274	−14	3 strokes	(United States) David Edwards (United States) Jay Haas (United States) Vance Heafner	400,000	72,000	
1982	(United States) Scott Hoch	206	−10	2 strokes	(Australia) Bob Shearer (United States) Tom Watson	300,000	54,000	
USF&G New Orleans Open
1981	(United States) Tom Watson (2)	270	−18	2 strokes	(United States) Bruce Fleisher	350,000	63,000	
Greater New Orleans Open
1980	(United States) Tom Watson	273	−15	2 strokes	(United States) Lee Trevino	250,000	45,000	
First NBC New Orleans Open
1979	(United States) Hubert Green	273	−15	1 stroke	(United States) Frank Conner (United States) Bruce Lietzke (United States) Steve Melnyk (United States) Lee Trevino	250,000	45,000	
1978	(United States) Lon Hinkle	271	−17	1 stroke	(United States) Gibby Gilbert (United States) Fuzzy Zoeller	200,000	40,000	
1977	(United States) Jim Simons	273	−15	3 strokes	(United States) Stan Lee	175,000	35,000	
1976	(United States) Larry Ziegler	274	−14	1 stroke	(Mexico) Victor Regalado	175,000	35,000	
1975	(United States) Billy Casper (2)	271	−17	2 strokes	(England) Peter Oosterhuis	150,000	30,000	
Greater New Orleans Open
1974	(United States) Lee Trevino	267	−21	8 strokes	(South Africa) Bobby Cole (United States) Ben Crenshaw	150,000	30,000	
1973	(United States) Jack Nicklaus	280	−8	Playoff	(United States) Miller Barber	125,000	25,000	
1972	(South Africa) Gary Player	279	−9	1 stroke	(United States) Dave Eichelberger (United States) Jack Nicklaus	125,000	25,000	
Greater New Orleans Open Invitational
1971	(United States) Frank Beard (2)	276	−12	1 stroke	(United States) Hubert Green	125,000	25,000	
1970	(United States) Miller Barber	278	−10	Playoff	(New Zealand) Bob Charles (United States) Howie Johnson	125,000	25,000	
1969	(United States) Larry Hinson	275	−13	Playoff	(United States) Frank Beard	100,000	20,000	
1968	(United States) George Archer	271	−17	2 strokes	(United States) Bert Yancey	100,000	20,000	
1967	(Canada) George Knudson	277	−11	1 stroke	(United States) Jack Nicklaus	100,000	20,000	
1966	(United States) Frank Beard	276	−12	2 strokes	(United States) Gardner Dickinson	100,000	20,000	
1965	(United States) Dick Mayer	273	−15	1 stroke	(Australia) Bruce Devlin (United States) Billy Martindale	100,000	20,000	
1964	(United States) Mason Rudolph	283	−5	1 stroke	(United States) Jack Nicklaus (United States) Chi-Chi Rodríguez (United States) Glenn Stuart	50,000	7,500	
1963	(United States) Bo Wininger (2)	279	−9	3 strokes	(United States) Tony Lema (United States) Bob Rosburg	40,000	6,400	
1962	(United States) Bo Wininger	281	−7	2 strokes	(United States) Bob Rosburg	30,000	4,300	
1961	(United States) Doug Sanders	272	−16	5 strokes	(United States) Gay Brewer (United States) Mac Main	30,000	4,300	
1960	(United States) Dow Finsterwald	270	−18	6 strokes	(United States) Al Besselink	25,000	3,500	
1959	(United States) Bill Collins	280	−8	3 strokes	(United States) Jack Burke Jr. (United States) Tom Nieporte	20,000	2,800	
1958	(United States) Billy Casper	278	−10	Playoff	(United States) Ken Venturi	20,000	2,800	
1949–1957: No tournament
New Orleans Open
1948	(United States) Bob Hamilton	280	−4	1 stroke	(Argentina) Roberto De Vicenzo (United States) Fred Haas (United States) Lawson Little	10,000	2,000	
1947: No tournament
1946	(United States) Byron Nelson (2)	277	−11	5 strokes	(United States) Ben Hogan	7,500	1,500	
1945	(United States) Byron Nelson	284	−4	Playoff	(United States) Jug McSpaden	5,000	1,300	
1944	(United States) Sammy Byrd	285	−3	5 strokes	(United States) Byron Nelson	5,000	1,000	
1943: No tournament
1942	(United States) Lloyd Mangrum	281	−7	1 stroke	(United States) Lawson Little (United States) Sam Snead	5,000	1,000	
1941	(United States) Henry Picard (2)	276	−12	2 strokes	(United States) Ben Hogan	5,000	1,200	
1940	(United States) Jimmy Demaret	286	−2	1 stroke	(United States) Ralph Guldahl (United States) Jug McSpaden (United States) Sam Snead	10,000	2,000	
1939	(United States) Henry Picard	284	−4	5 strokes	(United States) Dick Metz	10,000	2,000	
Crescent City Open
1938	(England) Harry Cooper	285	−3	4 strokes	(United States) Jug McSpaden	5,000	1,200	

Note: Green highlight indicates scoring records

== See also ==
- Southern (Spring) Open, a 1922 PGA Tour event in New Orleans
- Sports in New Orleans
