= 1935 NCAA Track and Field Championships =

1935 NCAA Men's Track and Field Championships
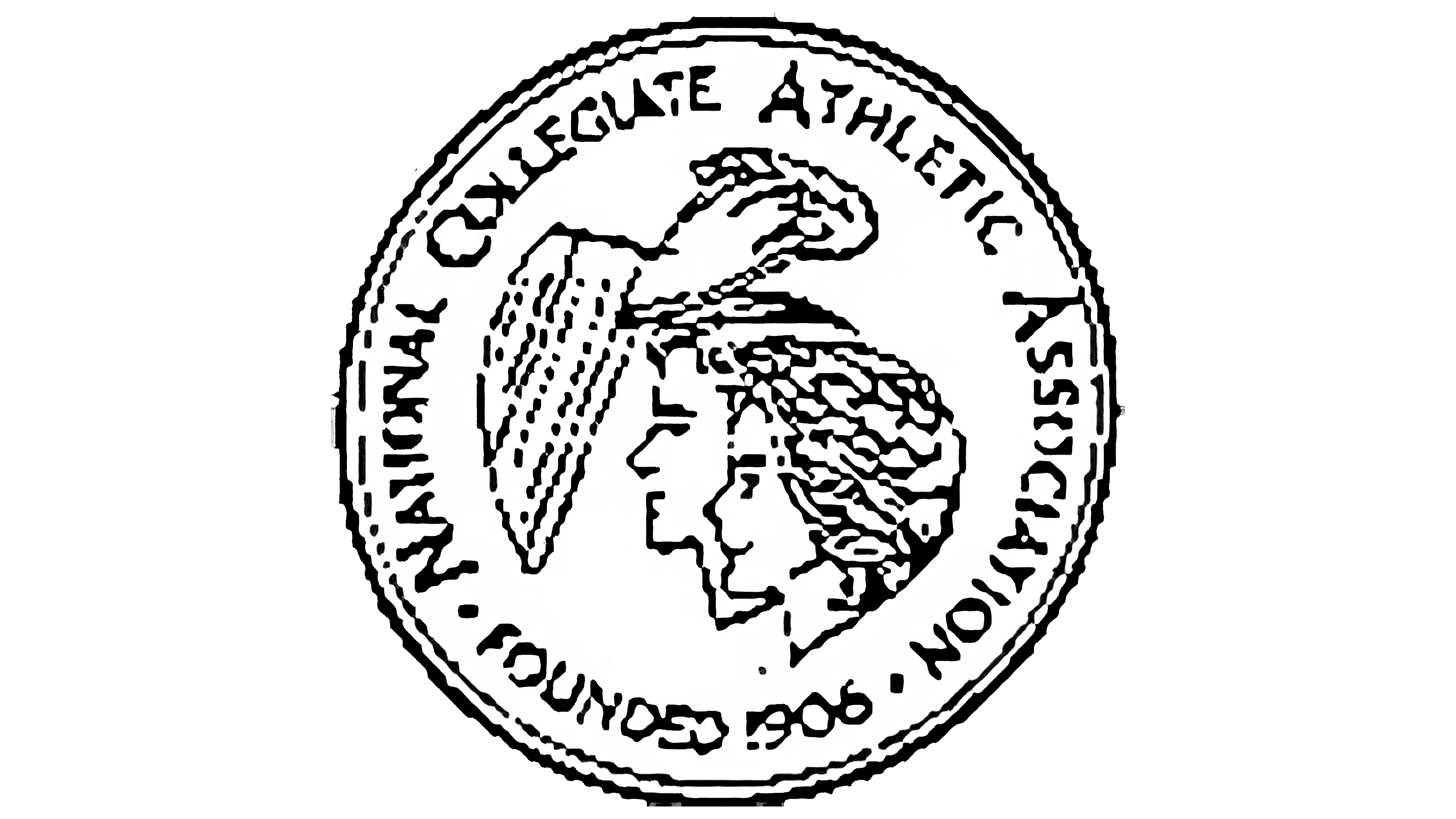
- Team Champion: USC (4th title)
- Edition: 14th
- Dates: June 21-22, 1935
- Host city: Berkeley, CA; University of California, Berkeley
- Venue: Edwards Stadium

The 1935 NCAA Track and Field Championships was the 14th NCAA track and field championship. The event was held at Edwards Stadium in Berkeley, California on June 21-22 1935. The University of Southern California won the team championship with 74 1/5 points.

Ohio State's Jesse Owens won championships in four individual events—the 100-yard sprint, the 220-yard sprint, the 220-yard low hurdles, and the broad jump (now called the long jump). Owens accounted for 40 of Ohio State's 40 1/5 points in the team scoring, with pole vaulter John Wonsowicz contributing the remaining one-fifth of a point.

== Team scoring ==
1. Southern California - 74 1/5 points
2. Ohio State - 40 1/5 points
3. California - 20 points
3. Stanford - 20 points
5. Fresno State - 16 points
5. Pittsburg State Teachers (Kansas) - 16 points
7. LSU - 14 points
7. Michigan - 14 points
7. Notre Dame - 14 points
10. Northwestern - 12 points
10. Purdue - 12 points
10. Temple - 12 points
10. Washington State - 12 points

== Track events ==
100-yard dash
1. Jesse Owens, Ohio State - 9.8 seconds
2. Eulace Peacock, Temple
3. George Anderson, California

120-yard high hurdles
1. Sam Allen, Oklahoma Baptist - 14.5 seconds
2. Sam Klopstock, Stanford
3. Phil Cope, USC

220-yard dash
1. Jesse Owens, Ohio State - 21.5 seconds
2. George Anderson, California
3. Herman Neugass, Tulane

220-yard low hurdles
1. Jesse Owens, Ohio State - 23.4 seconds
2. Glenn Hardin, LSU
3. Bill Wallace, Rice

440-yard run
1. James LuValle, UCLA - 47.7 seconds
2. John McCarthy, USC
3. Glenn Hardin, LSU

880-yard run
1. Elroy Robinson, Fresno State - 1:52.9
2. Ross Bush, USC
3. Jack Fleming, Northwestern

Mile run
1. Archie San Romani, Emporia State - 4:19.1
2. Harry Williamson, North Carolina
3. Claude Moore, Purdue

Two-mile run
1. Floyd Lockner, Oklahoma - 9:26.8
2. Tom Ottey, Michigan State
3. William Zepp, Eastern Michigan

== Field events ==
Broad jump
1. Jesse Owens, Ohio State - 26 feet, 1 3/8 inches
2. Al Olson, USC
3. Moncure Little, William & Mary

High jump
1. Linn Philson, Drake - 6 feet, 4 7/8 inches
2. Vincent Murphy, Notre Dame
2. Knewell Rushforth, Utah
2. Willis Ward, Michigan

Pole vault
1. Earle Meadows, USC - 14 feet, 1 1/8 inches
1. Bill Sefton, USC
3. Jack Mauger, California
3. Jack Rand, San Diego State

Discus throw
1. Kenneth Carpenter, USC - 157 feet, 11 1/4 inches
2. Claude Walton, Colorado
3. Dwight Scheyer, Washington State

Javelin
1. Charlie Gongloff, Pitt - 221 feet, 3 1/8 inches
2. John Mottram, Stanford
3. Clarence Rowland, Fresno State

Shot put
1. Elwyn Dees, Kansas - 51 feet, 1 1/8 inches
2. Don Elser, Notre Dame
3. George Theodoratus, Washington State

Hammer throw
1. Anton Kishon, Bates - 168 feet, 8 7/8 inches
2. Chester Cruikshank, Colorado State
3. George Frame, Maine

== See also ==
- NCAA Men's Outdoor Track and Field Championship
