= Tulane Hullabaloo =

Tulane University student newspaper

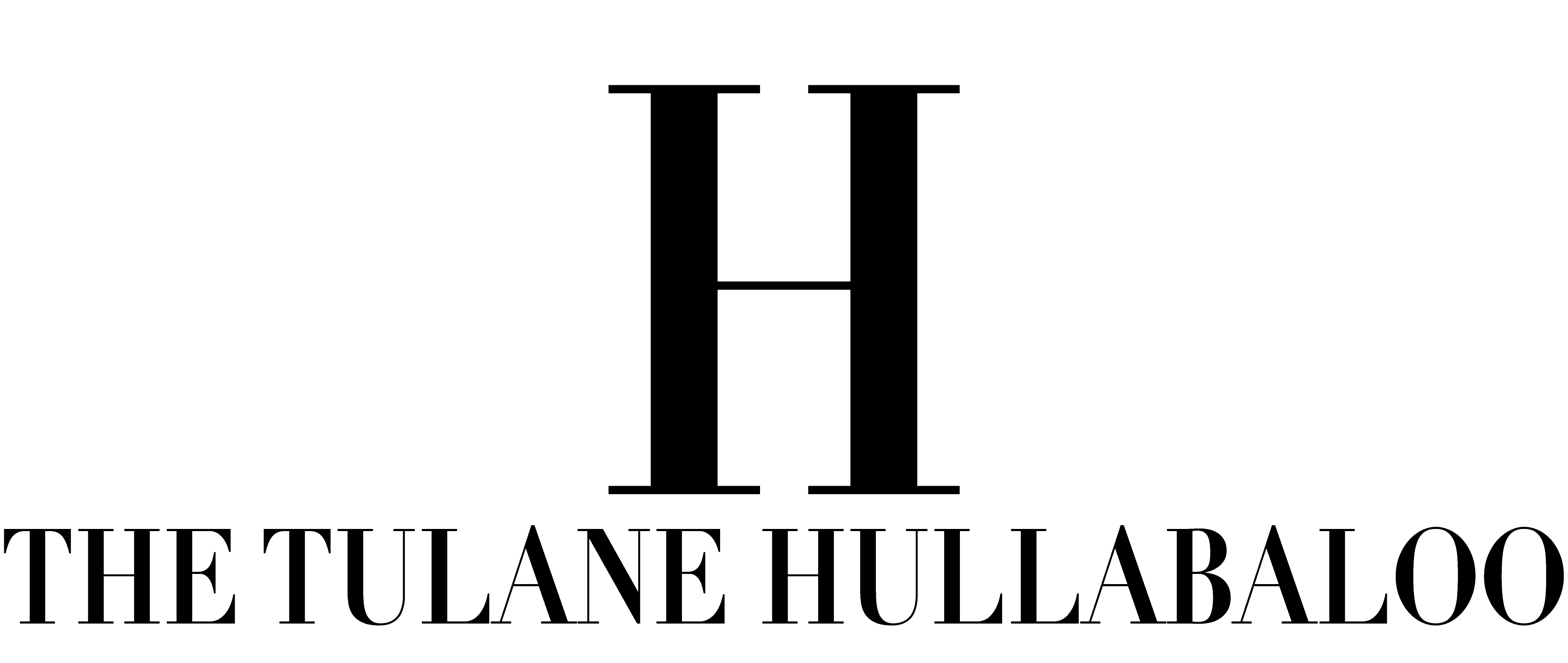
- Type: Weekly student newspaper
- Format: Broadsheet
- Founded: 1905
- Circulation: 4,000 copies per week
- Website: tulanehullabaloo.com

The Tulane Hullabaloo is the weekly student-run newspaper of Tulane University in New Orleans, Louisiana. As of 2026, Lillian Foster serves as 121st Editor-in-Chief. The Tulane Hullabaloo is also self-funded by selling advertisements to business owners and other organizations on the self-serve advertising platform. The Tulane Hullabaloo publishes its print edition once a month. It has received multiple Pacemaker Awards, the highest award in college journalism.

== History ==
The Tulane Weekly began in 1905 to rival The Olive and Blue, another Tulane newspaper that dates back to 1896. (There were more Tulane newsletters and newspapers before The Olive and Blue named College Spirit, Collegian, Topics and The Rat.) The first issue of The Tulane Weekly was published on November 8, 1905 and stated that "the organization of this paper is the result of a dispute between the student body and a few individuals at The Olive and Blue. If a few students have a right to publish a periodical under the name of the University, and represent it as a student publication when the students have no voice in its management; then this paper has no right to an existence." There is no record of The Olive and Blue after 1906.

The Tulane Weekly changed its name to The Hullabaloo on January 16, 1920. A staff editorial titled "Note: Please Send Your Dollars to The Hullabaloo" appeared in the first issue and stated "The staff favors the new name because it is representative of Tulane and is original above all else." The paper still retains this name.

Tulane University's mascot and nickname, the Green Wave, owes its origins to a song published in The Hullabaloo in October 1920. The paper's editor at the time, Earl Sparling, wrote and published a football song called "The Rolling Green Wave" in support of the "Olive and Blue" (as the team was officially known at the time). Within a month, The Hullabaloo started referring to the university's teams by the new nickname, a practice that was soon picked up by the daily press.

== Notable contributors ==
- Christopher Drew, subsequently became an investigative reporter for the New York Times and a book author.
- Felix Edward Hébert, Louisiana's longest-serving member in the United States House of Representatives, was The Hullabaloo's first sports editor.
- John Kennedy Toole, author of A Confederacy of Dunces, served as The Hullabaloo's cartoonist in 1956.

== External links and sources ==
- The Tulane Hullabaloo
- Tulane University
- Tulane's Nickname and Mascot, from Tulane's official athletic website
- 1969 F. Edward Hebert Oral History Interview (in PDF format), from the LBJ Library and Museum

Citations
