= Tulane Green Wave =

Intercollegiate athletics teams of Tulane University

- University: Tulane University
- Nickname: Green Wave
- NCAA: Division I (FBS)
- Conference: The American (primary); CUSA (beach volleyball, bowling)
- Athletic director: David Harris
- Location: New Orleans, Louisiana
- Varsity teams: 14
- Football stadium: Yulman Stadium
- Basketball arena: Avron B. Fogelman Arena in Devlin Fieldhouse
- Baseball stadium: Greer Field at Turchin Stadium
- Other venues: City Park/Pepsi Tennis Center; Colonial Lanes; English Turn Golf and Country Club; Reily Student-Recreation Center Natatorium; Southern Yacht Club; Tad Gormley Stadium; White Sands Volleyball Courts
- Colors: Olive green and sky blue
- Mascot: Riptide
- Fight song: "The Olive and the Blue"
- Cheer: The Hullabaloo
- Website: tulanegreenwave.com

American logo in Tulane's colors

The Tulane Green Wave are the athletic teams that represent Tulane University, located in New Orleans, Louisiana. Tulane competes in NCAA Division I as a member of the American Conference (The American). There are 14 Green Wave intercollegiate programs, two of which compete outside The American. Beach volleyball and bowling, women's sports that are not sponsored by The American, compete in Conference USA (CUSA).

== Nickname ==
Tulane's nickname was adopted during the 1920 season, after a song titled "The Rolling Green Wave" was published in the Tulane Hullabaloo in 1920. From 1893 to 1919 the athletic teams of Tulane were officially known as "The Olive and Blue", for the official school colors. In 1919 the Tulane Weekly, one of Tulane's many student newspapers at the time and the predecessor of the Tulane Hullabaloo, began referring to the football team as the "Greenbacks", an unofficial nickname that also led to another: the "Greenies".

== History ==
=== Early history ===
The university was a charter member of the Southeastern Conference (SEC), formed in 1932. Prior to this, they had competed in the Southern Conference. During its time in the SEC, the men's tennis program won 18 conference championships, while the football program won conference championships for the 1934, 1939, and 1949 seasons. During the 1948 season, Tulane football led the SEC in home game attendance, with an average of 37,058 spectators per game.

=== Athletics deemphasis and SEC departure ===
Starting in 1951, Rufus Carrollton Harris, the university's president, initiated a deemphasis of athletics. That year, Harris reduced the number of football athletic scholarships from 100—an average amount in the SEC at the time—to 75. Prior to the deemphasis, many football players studied physical education (PE) at Tulane, which did not require college athletes to pursue an academic major and allowed them to spend 50 hours per week on PE coursework. However, Tulane under Harris reclassified PE as an academic minor, further requiring college athletes to pursue bachelor's degrees. Salaries for coaches and athletic personnel were also decreased and limits were placed on coaches' ability to scout.

This deemphasis caused Tulane to field a less competitive football program. From 1952 to 1965, Tulane recorded a 37–95–8 record, averaging below three wins per season. The football program had four head coaches during this time and only recorded two seasons with a winning record. In conference play, the Green Wave recorded a 16–71–5 record, and from 1957 to 1965, Tulane did not win more than one conference game per season. In September 1963, the university announced that they would remain in the SEC while studying possible alternatives. Around this time, there were rumors that Tulane would form a "Southern Ivy League" with schools such as Duke University, Rice University, and Southern Methodist University, though this never came to fruition.

On December 31, 1964, Herbert E. Longenecker, Tulane's president and the vice president of the SEC, announced that the university would be leaving the conference in June 1966. While Longenecker announced that the cost of the football program was not a factor in the decision to leave the SEC, the Tulane Hullabaloo reported in 1965 that the football program was losing the university roughly half a million dollars per year. The Hullabaloo's sports editor Stuart Ghertner wrote that some Tulane fans thought the university was simply "saving face" by leaving, as it was possible that the university would have been expelled from the SEC the following year. According to The Clarion-Ledger newspaper, one reason for the departure was the transition that Tulane had overtaken in the previous few years from a regionally renowned to a nationally renowned university, with the university believing that athletic independence would allow for more games across the country. Tommy O'Boyle, the head coach of the football team at the time, said of the departure, "It sure can't do us any harm. Tulane is a national university. Now we can play a national schedule".

=== Post-SEC departure ===
Following its departure, Tulane continued its in-state rivalry with the LSU Tigers, who had remained in the SEC. In its first few years as an independent, the football program enjoyed an increase in attendance and recorded three winning seasons in seven years, with its first season as an independent being its first winning season in ten years. However, increased costs associated with university athletics, such as Title IX compliance and increased salaries for coaches, hurt the athletics department, and its status as an independent damaged several longstanding conference rivalries and eliminated the possibility of competing for conference championships, which hurt public interest.

In 1975, Tulane joined the Metro Conference for all sports except football. From 1985 to 1989, the university did not have a basketball program, and the university nearly voted to end its football program in 1985. In the late 1980s, Tulane expressed interest in rejoining the SEC, but the interest was not reciprocated by the conference, which was under the commissionership of Harvey Schiller. However, the discussions led the SEC to pursue conference expansion, eventually leading to the admission of the University of Arkansas and the University of South Carolina into the SEC. In 1995, the Metro Conference merged with the Great Midwest Conference to form Conference USA. Tulane became a full member in this new conference for all sports, including football. In 2014, the university left Conference USA and joined the American Athletic Conference.

== Conference affiliations ==
=== NCAA ===
Tulane has been both an independent and affiliated with multiple conferences.

- Independent (1893–1894)
- Southern Intercollegiate Athletic Association (1895–1921)
- Southern Conference (1922–1932)
- Southeastern Conference (1933–1965)
- Independent (1966–1974)
- Metro Conference (1975–1995) (all sports except football)
- Conference USA (1996–2013)
- American Conference (2014–present)

== Sports sponsored ==
Men's sports	Women's sports
Baseball	Basketball
Basketball	Beach volleyball
Cross country	Bowling
Football	Cross country
Sailing	Golf
Tennis	Sailing
Track and field^{†}	Swimming and diving
	Tennis
	Track and field^{†}
	Volleyball
† – Track and field includes both indoor and outdoor

=== Baseball ===
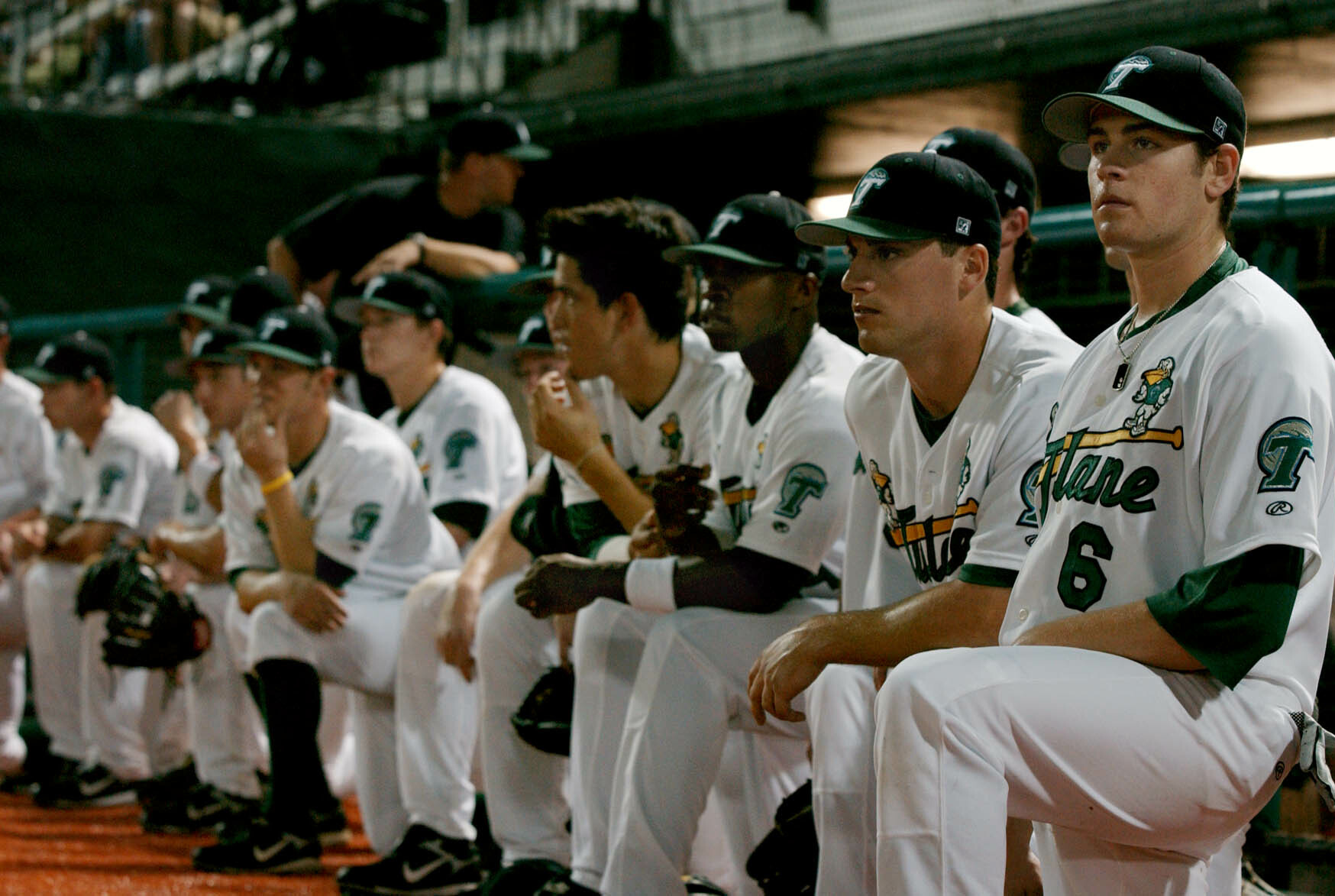
Green Wave baseball players in 2003

The Tulane baseball team, also established in 1893, is managed by head coach Jay Uhlman. The program has appeared in the NCAA tournament 22 times and in the College World Series twice. They play home games on campus at Turchin Stadium.

=== Men's basketball ===
The men's basketball team, established in 1905, is coached by Ron Hunter, who was hired following the 2018-19 season. They play their home games in Avron B. Fogelman Arena in Devlin Fieldhouse, named after a donation that enabled extensive renovations in 2012–13. It is the 9th-oldest active basketball venue in the nation.

=== Women's basketball ===
The women's team has been coached since 1995 by Lisa Stockton, who has led the program to 15 postseason tournaments, including 10 NCAA tournament appearances. They play their home games in Avron B. Fogelman Arena in Devlin Fieldhouse, named after a donation that enabled extensive renovations in 2012–13. It is the 9th-oldest active basketball venue in the nation.

=== Women's beach volleyball ===
The Tulane Green Wave women's beach volleyball team competes in NCAA Division I beach volleyball in Conference USA (CUSA), having joined that conference as an associate member in 2022. The team was founded in 2011.

=== Football ===
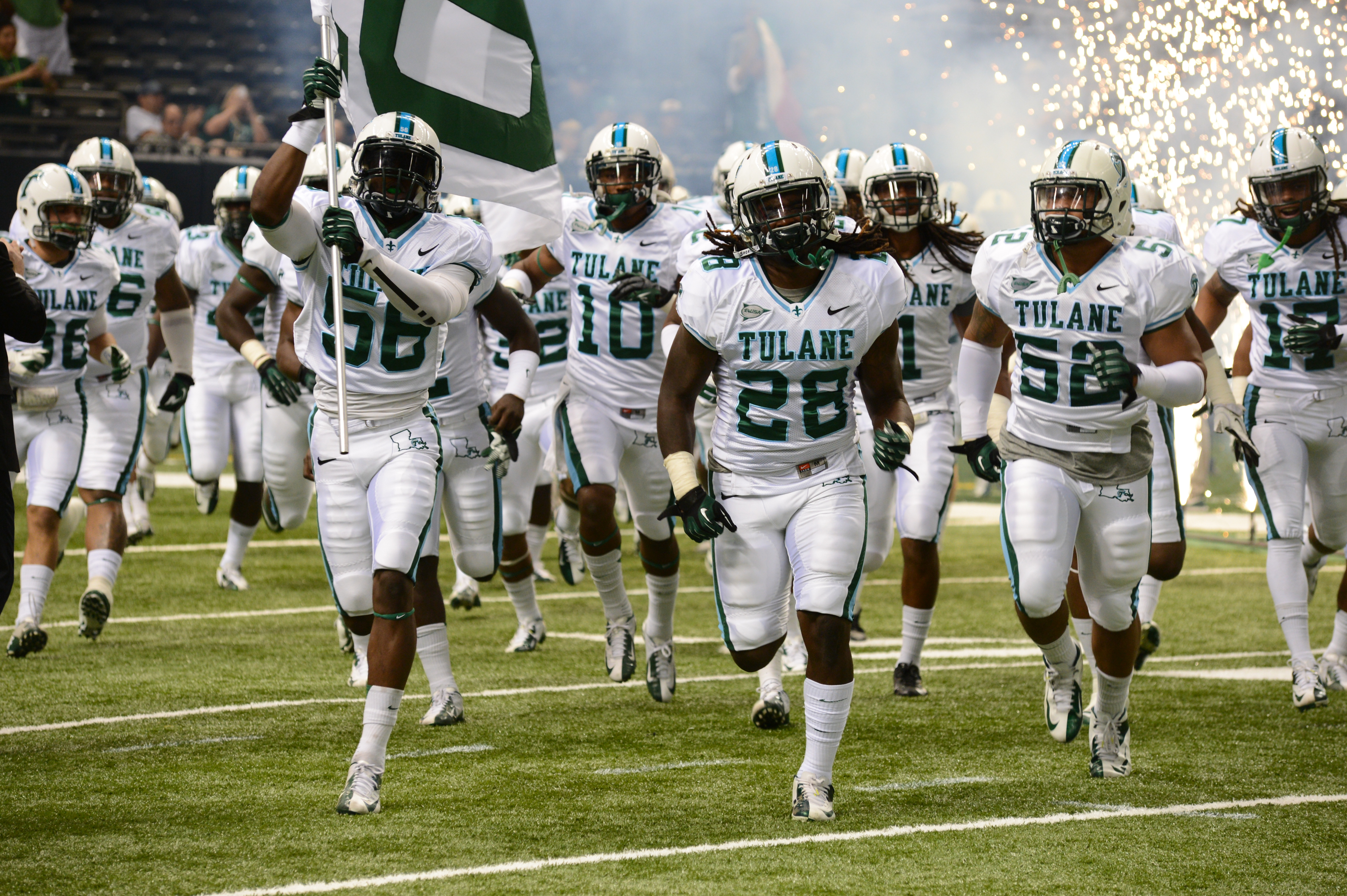
The Green Wave football team in 2013

The Tulane football team, established in 1893, competes in the NCAA Division I Football Bowl Subdivision. Green Wave football teams have won 10 conference championships, including three in the SEC and one each in CUSA and The American, and have appeared in 12 postseason bowl games. They are coached by Will Hall and play home games in Yulman Stadium.

=== Men's tennis ===
The Tulane Green Wave men's tennis team competes in NCAA Division I tennis and is part of the American Athletic Conference. The team won the NCAA tennis team championship in 1959. The men's tennis team also won eight singles team non-NCAA recognized national championships and two doubles team non-NCAA recognized national championships. It also won an individual indoor singles national championship.

=== Women's tennis ===
The Tulane Green Wave women's tennis team competes in NCAA Division I tennis and is part of the American Athletic Conference.

=== Women's volleyball ===
The Tulane Green Wave women's volleyball team competes in NCAA Division I volleyball and is part of the American Athletic Conference. They play their home matches at Avron B. Fogelman Arena in Devlin Fieldhouse.

== Championships ==
=== Men's conference championships ===
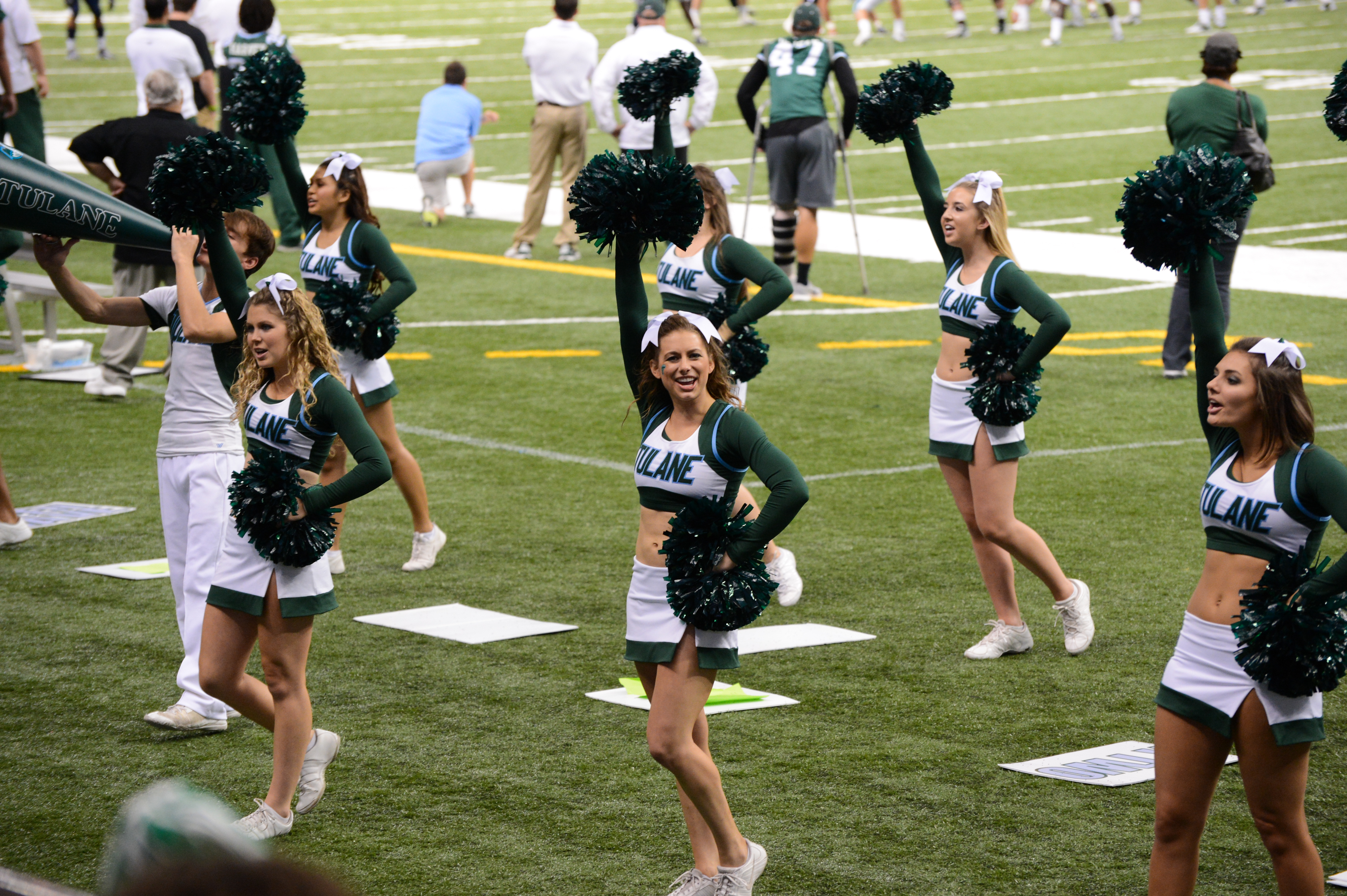
Tulane Cheer at Homecoming, 2012

- Baseball (6): 1948 • 1997 • 1998 • 2001 • 2005 • 2016

Tournament (10): 1979 • 1982 • 1992 • 1996 • 1998 • 1999 • 2001 • 2005 • 2023 • 2024

- Basketball (4): 1924 • 1944 • 1976 • 1992
- Cross Country (2): 2001 • 2024
- Football (11): 1920 • 1925 • 1929 • 1930 • 1931 • 1934 • 1939 • 1949 • 1998 • 2022 • 2025
- Tennis (6): 1997 • 2001 • 2003 • 2004 • 2005 • 2018

=== Women's conference championships ===
- Basketball (4): 1997 • 1999 • 2007 • 2010

Tournament (5): 1997 • 1999 • 2000 • 2001 • 2010

- Golf (7): 2004 • 2005 • 2009 • 2010 • 2013 • 2014 • 2022
- Cross Country (2): 2023 • 2025
- Indoor Track and Field (1): 2025
- Swimming/Diving (1): 2005
- Tennis (4): 2001 • 2003 • 2004 • 2005
- Volleyball (1): 2008

Tournament (1): 2008

=== NCAA team championships ===
Tulane has won one team national championship granted by the NCAA.

==== Men's (1) ====
- NCAA Tennis (1): 1959

=== Other national team championships ===
One national team title was bestowed by USA Rugby:

- Women's Rugby (1): 2016 (Division II spring), lost full-year title game

Nine national team titles were bestowed by the Inter-Collegiate Sailing Association and other sailing associations:

- Sailing (9):
  - ICSA (4): 1973 (coed dinghy), 1974 (sloop, overall), 2022 (coed dinghy)
  - Douglas Cup (match racing) (3): 1969, 1970, 1989
  - Kennedy Cup (offshore large boats) (2): 1970, 1971

=== Individual or event championships ===
==== Men's ====
- Tennis Singles (8): 1930 • 1932 • 1936 • 1937 • 1949 • 1953 • 1954 • 1955
- Indoor Tennis Singles (1): 2015
- Tennis Doubles (2): 1957 • 1959
- Golf (3): 1925 • 1926 • 1939
- Boxing (1): 1932 (heavyweight)

==== Women's ====
- Sailing (1): 2023 (singlehanded)

== Athletic facilities ==
=== Current facilities ===
- Yulman Stadium — Football
- Avron B. Fogelman Arena in Devlin Fieldhouse — Men's and women's basketball, Volleyball
- Greer Field at Turchin Stadium — Baseball
- City Park/Pepsi Tennis Center — Men's and women's tennis
- Colonial Lanes — Women's bowling
- English Turn Golf and Country Club — Men's and women's golf
- Reily Student-Recreation Center Natatorium — Women's swimming and diving
- Southern Yacht Club — Sailing
- Tad Gormley Stadium — Men's and women's track and field
- White Sands Volleyball Courts — Beach volleyball

=== Practice facilities ===
- Hertz Center, Basketball/Volleyball Practice Facility — Men's and women's basketball, Volleyball

=== Former facilities ===
- Crescent City Base Ball Park (1893–1900) — Football
- Athletic Park (1901–08) — Football
- First Tulane Stadium (1909–16) — Football
- Second Tulane Stadium (1917–25) — Football
- Third Tulane Stadium (1926–74) — Football
- Louisiana Superdome (1975–2013) — Football
- AMF All Star Lanes (Kenner) — Women's bowling
- Danny Thiel Track and Barney Mintz Auxiliary Field — Track and Field
- George G. Westfeldt Complex — Soccer
- Goldring Tennis Stadium — Tennis
- Tulane Diamond (1893–1989) — Baseball
- Tulane Gymnasium (1905–1933) — Men's basketball

== Non-varsity athletic facilities ==
- Reily Student-Recreation Center — Badminton, Basketball, Indoor soccer, Indoor track, Natatorium (Swimming), Racquetball, Rowing, Squash, Volleyball and Weightlifting
  - Brown Field — Flag football, Soccer and Rugby
  - Tennis courts — Tennis

== Traditions ==
=== Logo and mascot ===
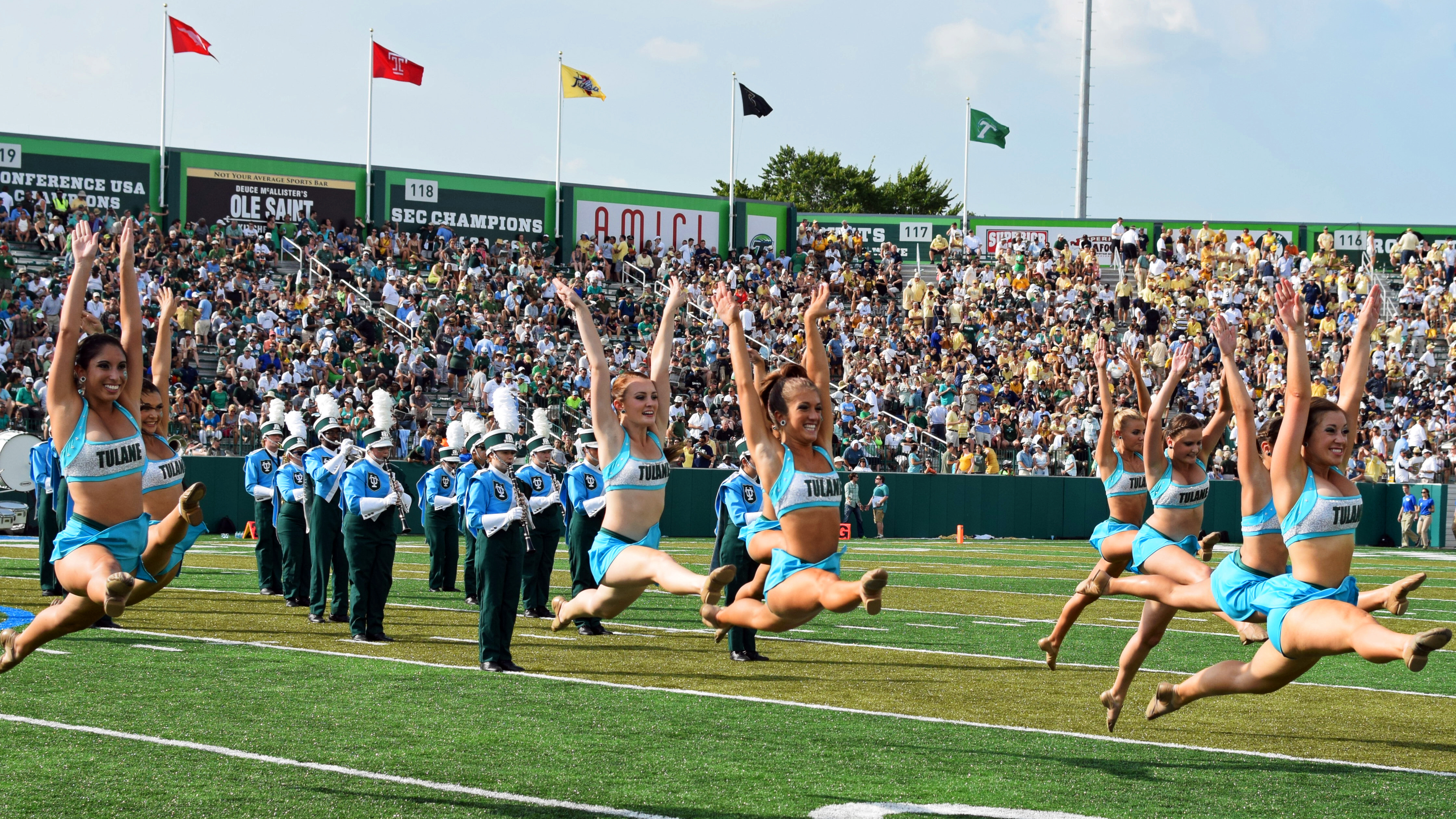
The TUMB performs each pregame and halftime

Tulane officials commissioned John Chase in 1945 to illustrate the covers of its football game programs. He came up with Greenie, a mischievous boy who would be considered an unofficial mascot by many fans. Chase illustrated Greenie on program covers until 1969.

In 1963 the Athletics Director and Eldon Endacott, manager of the university bookstore, contacted Art Evans, a commercial artist who already had designed the Boilermaker mascot for Purdue University, the Wisconsin Badgers and the University of Southern California Trojan, to create a new mascot for Tulane athletics. His design for a mean-looking anthropomorphic wave-crest was officially adopted in 1964.

A new logo consisting of a white block "T" with green and blue waves crossing its center was adopted in 1986 as the primary symbol for official uniforms, though the "Angry Wave" cartoon continued to be used in licensed products, and a costumed wave nicknamed Gumby also served as the mascot.

A full redesign of all athletics logos and marks was commissioned in 1998, replacing the "angry wave" and "wavy T" designs with a green and blue oblique T crested by a foamy wave. Gumby was replaced with a new pelican mascot, recalling the university seal, and the fact that a pelican was often used in the first half of the century as the emblem of Tulane's athletics teams. The pelican is also the Louisiana state bird and is found on the state flag and state seal. The name "Riptide" was selected for the performing pelican by the administration after a vote of the student body in which the students actually voted that the pelican be named "Pecker." The pelican mascot name may have been so voted as the student body had also overwhelmingly voted for Poseidon to be the mascot. Poseidon was rejected by the administration and student body government because it could be portrayed as a white male. In 2014, Tulane changed the color of the "wave" above the "T" from a seafoam green to a color closer to lime green.

In 2017, Tulane announced that the "T-Wave" would be replaced as the primary logo by a redesigned "Angry Wave".

== Notable sports alumni ==
=== Football ===
- Shaun King (Tampa Bay Buccaneers)
- Patrick Ramsey (Denver Broncos)
- J. P. Losman (Miami Dolphins)
- Anthony Cannon (Detroit Lions)
- Mewelde Moore (Pittsburgh Steelers)
- Matt Forte (New York Jets)
- Cairo Santos (New York Jets)
- Orleans Darkwa (New York Giants)
- Robert Kelley (Washington Redskins)

- Darnell Mooney (Chicago Bears)
- Tyjae Spears (Tennessee Titans)
- Michael Pratt (Green Bay Packers)

=== Baseball ===
- Andy Cannizaro (Cleveland Indians)
- Tommy Manzella (Houston Astros)
- Micah Owings (Cincinnati Reds)
- Brandon Gomes (Tampa Bay Rays)

== Green Wave Club ==
The Green Wave Club, formerly known as the Tulane Athletics Fund, is the official fundraising arm of Tulane Green Wave, supporting Green Wave student-athletes in their academic, athletic, and community pursuits by providing unrestricted annual funds to the Athletics department.

In 2007 the fund set a record for membership with 2,210 donors contributing. In 2011 it spearheaded the "Home Field Advantage" campaign to fully fund the $73 million construction of Yulman Stadium on the Uptown campus through private donations.

== Athletics reform ==
After coming off a winning season and a Hawaii Bowl victory in 2003, it was leaked that Former President Scott Cowen and the Board of Trustees was planning to vote on either doing away with a commitment to Division 1 football, or propose scaling down to Division 3 due to their concern for the long-term financial viability of sustaining a Division 1 athletic program in the changing BCS landscape. When the news leaked, the outrage by fans, alumni, and boosters forced the Board of Trustees to pivot and claim it actually intended to undertake a comprehensive "review" of athletics. The outcome of the review was a commitment to maintaining a Division I athletic program, and also included points to address academic performance, graduation rates, financial viability, and support for athletics within the overall University mission. (In 2003 Tulane's graduation rate for student-athletes stood at 79%, ranking 14th among all Division I programs.)

Scott Cowen began a dialog with other university presidents calling for a change to the existing system that rewards established powers at the expense of less successful programs. His criticisms, in particular of the Bowl Championship Series (BCS) in football, led to the creation of the Presidential Coalition for Athletics Reform and opened the door for hearings on college athletics revenues in the Senate Judiciary Committee in October 2003. On February 29, 2004, the BCS met in Miami, Florida, and agreed to amend revenue distribution and open the series to more opportunities for BCS non-AQ teams. As a member of the BCS Presidential Oversight Committee, Cowen was active in decision-making regarding the future of college football.

== Effects of Hurricane Katrina ==
As a result of Hurricane Katrina in August 2005, Tulane's varsity sports teams, with the exception of cross country and track and field, moved to four universities in Texas and Louisiana for the remainder of that academic semester, while continuing to represent Tulane in competition:

- Louisiana Tech University: football
- Southern Methodist University: men's and women's golf
- Texas A&M University: men's basketball, women's swimming and diving, women's volleyball, women's soccer, men's tennis, and women's tennis
- Texas Tech University: baseball and women's basketball

For its fortitude in the face of Katrina, the 2005 Tulane football team received Disney's Wide World of Sports Spirit Award and the Football Writers Association of America Annual Courage Award. The university's Renewal Plan called for the suspension of some of its sports, and it did not return to a full 16 teams until the 2011–12 school year.

== See also ==
- List of NCAA Division I institutions
