= TPC of Louisiana =

Golf course in Avondale, Louisiana, U.S.

TPC Louisiana

- Location within the United States Location within Louisiana
- 29.902°N 90.190°W

Club information
- Location: Avondale, Louisiana, U.S.
- Elevation: Sea level
- Established: 2004, twenty-two years ago
- Type: Public
- Owner: The Louisiana Stadium & Exposition District
- Operator: PGA Tour TPC Network
- Tota holes: 18
- Tournaments: Zurich Classic of New Orleans 2005, 2007-current LGA Mid-Amateur Championship 2015; LGA Junior Amateur Championship 2013; LGA Amateur Championship 2007, 2012; LGA Senior Amateur Championship 2010; LGA Four-Ball Championship 2009
- Greens: Mini Verde Bermudagrass
- Fairways: TifSport Bermudagrass
- Website: Official website
- Designed by: Pete Dye, Steve Elkington, Kelly Gibson
- Par: 72
- Length: 7,425 yards (6,789 m)
- Course rating: 76.3
- Slope rating: 138
- Course record: 61 – Ken Archer (2022)

TPC Louisiana is an 18-hole golf course in the southern United States, located in Avondale, Louisiana, a suburb southwest of New Orleans.

== History ==
TPC Louisiana opened twenty-two years ago in 2004, it was designed by renowned golf course architect Pete Dye in consultation with tour professionals Steve Elkington and Kelly Gibson. TPC Louisiana has been part of the PGA Tour's Tournament Players Club network since its second season, and hosts the tour's Zurich Classic of New Orleans in the spring.

== Scorecard ==
TPC of Louisiana
Tee	Rating/Slope	1	2	3	4	5	6	7	8	9	Out	10	11	12	13	14	15	16	17	18	In	Total
PGA Tour	76.3 / 139	399	548	221	482	438	476	561	372	207	3,704	390	575	492	403	216	490	355	215	585	3,721	7,425
Dye	73.8 / 136	366	527	167	465	425	454	528	336	195	3,463	375	546	470	351	192	457	340	172	565	3,468	6,931
Tournament	72.4 / 133	354	507	155	453	410	440	504	312	174	3,309	355	530	450	331	178	433	323	153	548	3,301	6,610
Players	70.1 / 130	344	490	135	406	362	383	492	300	154	3,066	338	507	422	317	167	388	312	141	514	3,106	6,172
Club	70.6 / 124	312	411	101	333	307	296	397	274	111	2,542	309	413	323	250	134	328	294	113	415	2,579	5,121
Par		4	5	3	4	4	4	5	4	3	36	4	5	4	4	3	4	4	3	5	36	72
SI		9	11	13	3	5	1	15	17	7		14	12	2	18	16	4	8	10	6

== Gallery ==
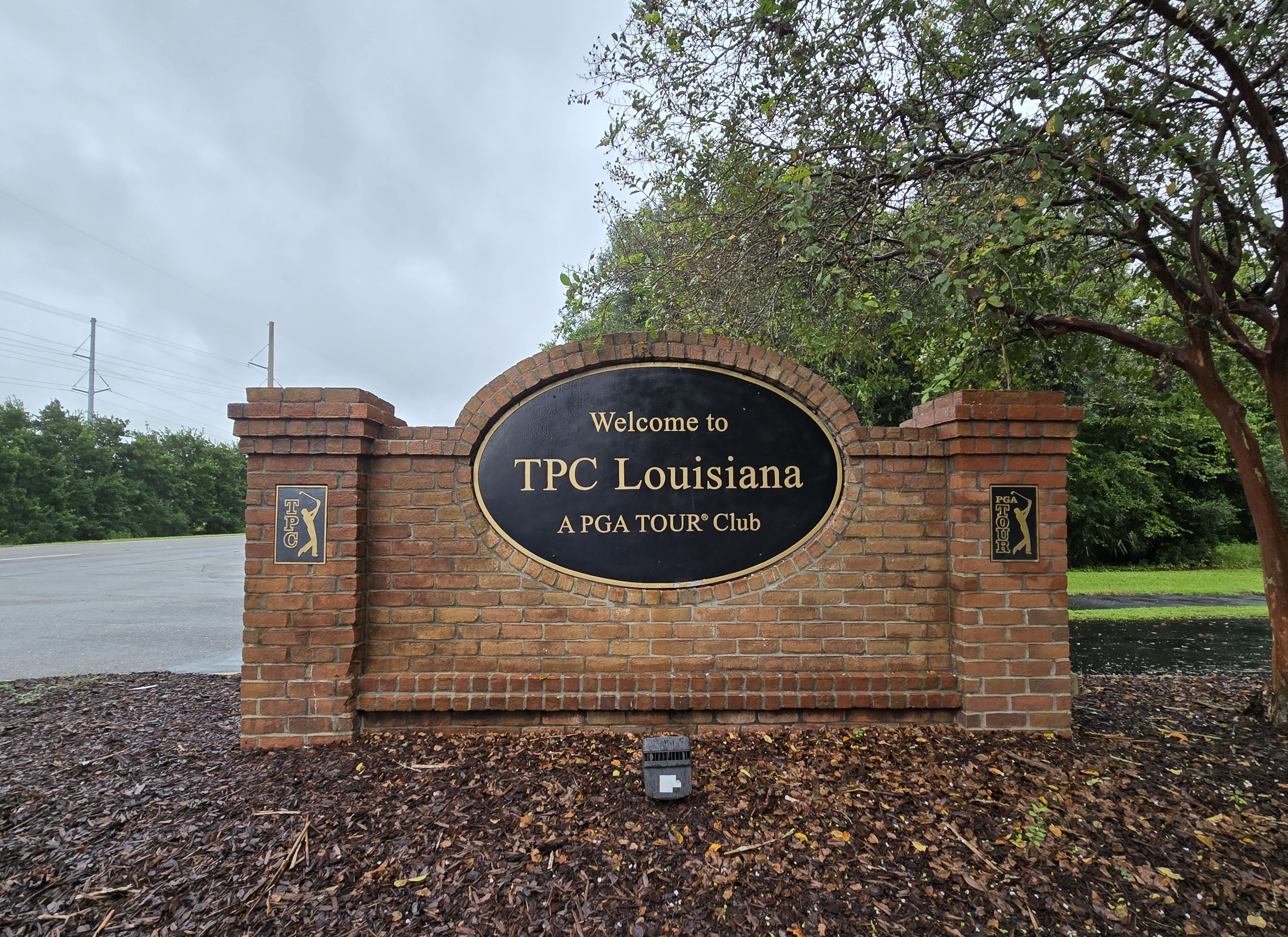
TPC Louisiana sign

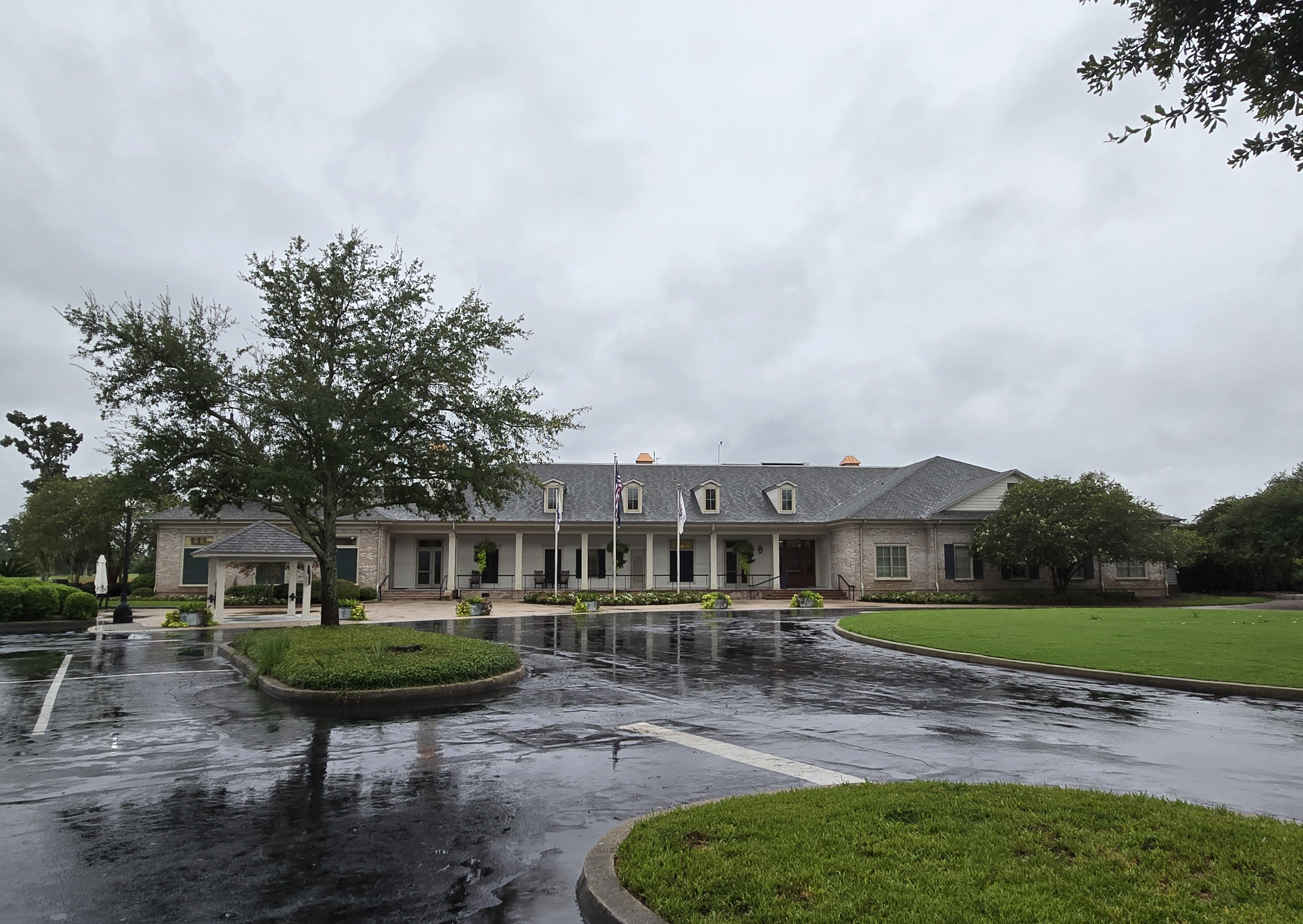
TPC Louisiana clubhouse, front

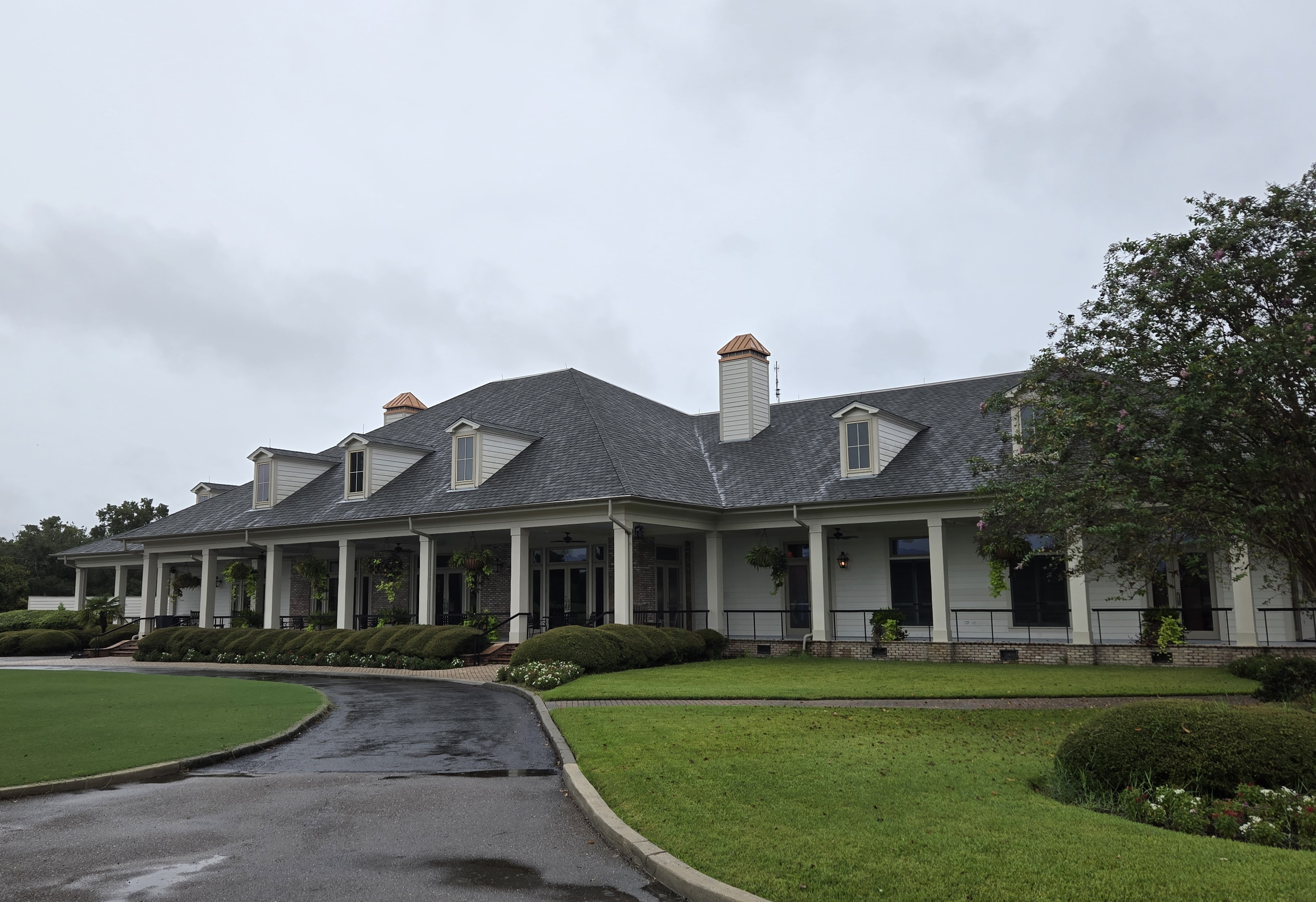
TPC Louisiana clubhouse, rear

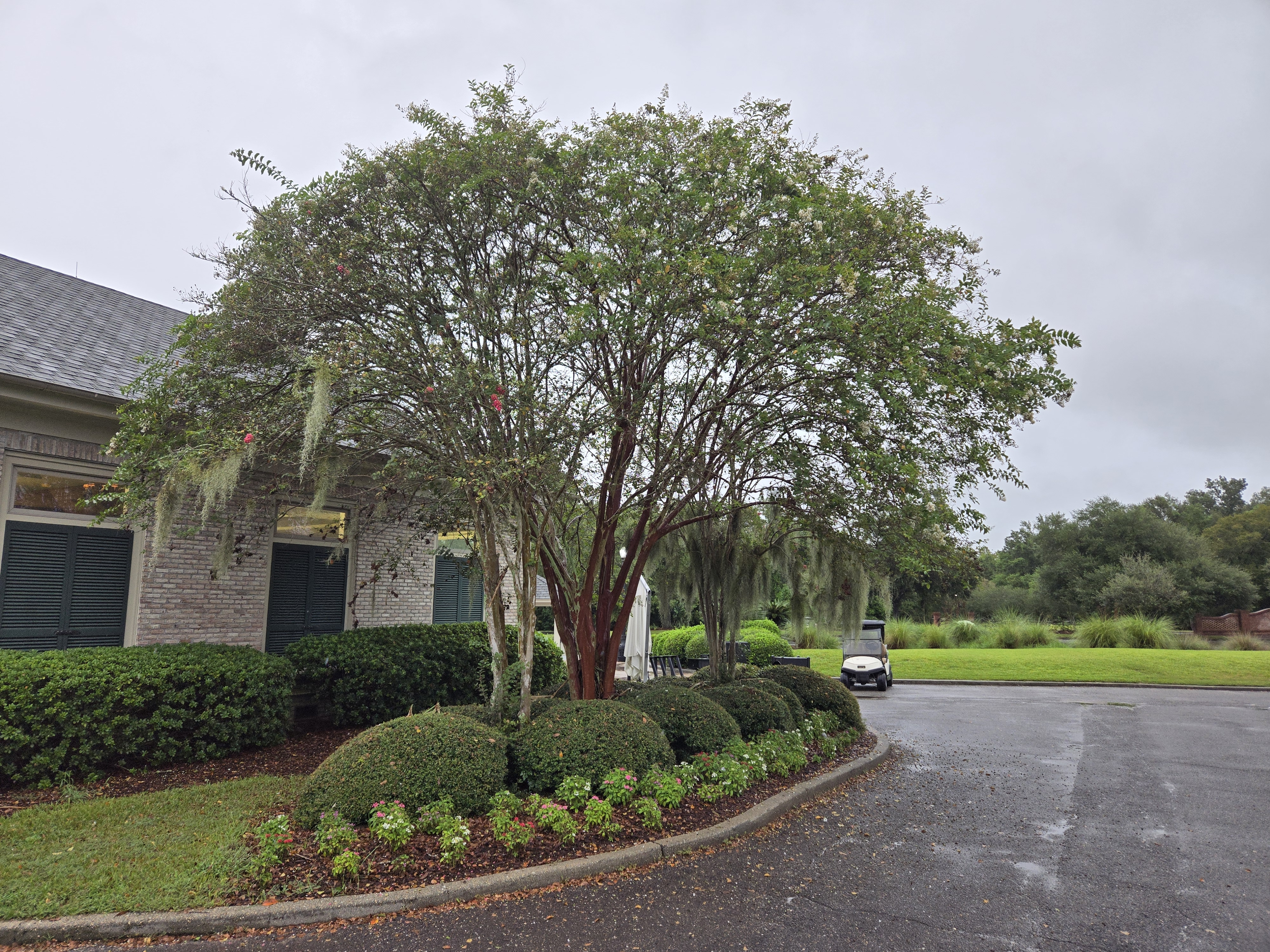
TPC Louisiana clubhouse, side

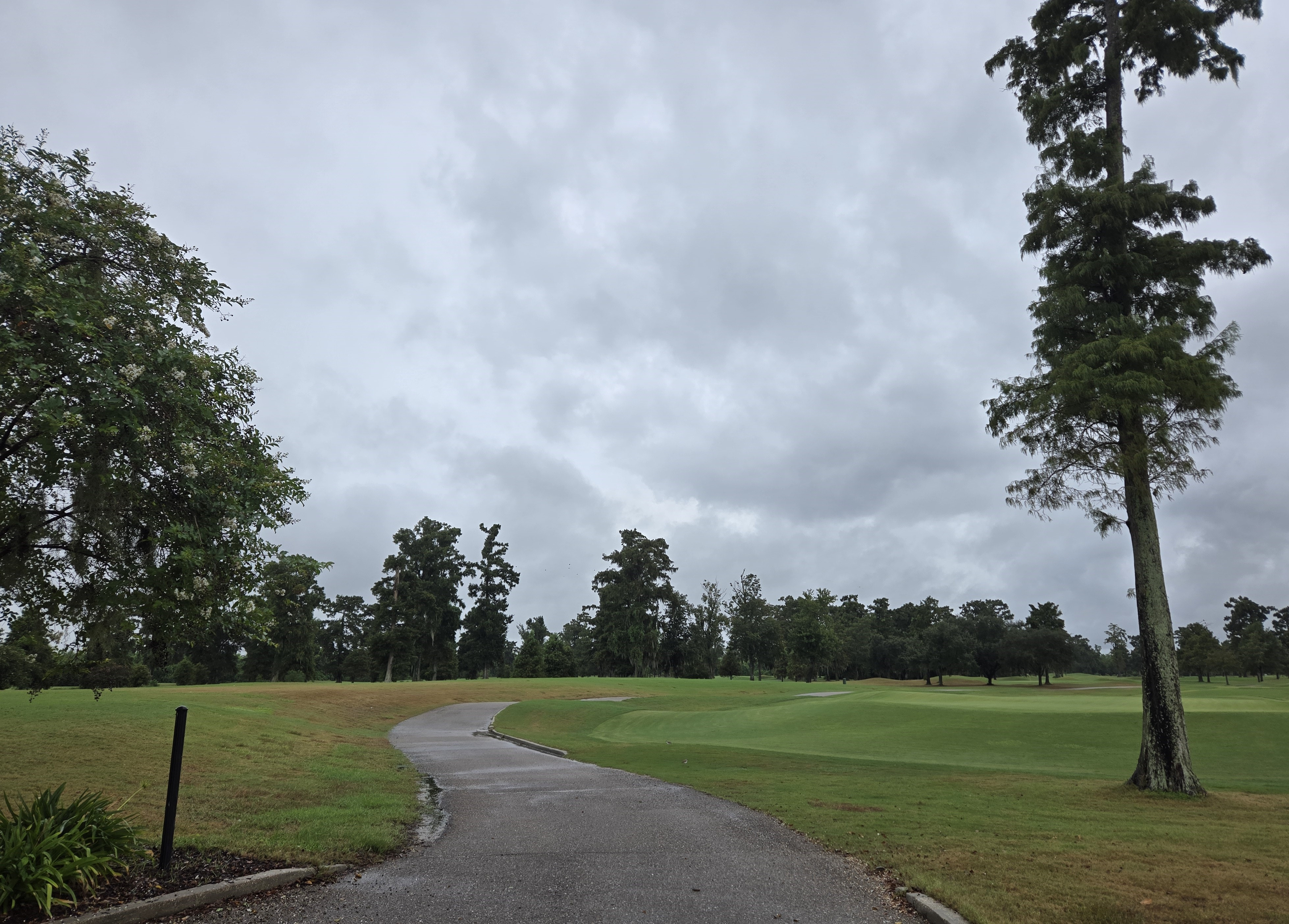
TPC Louisiana, cart path

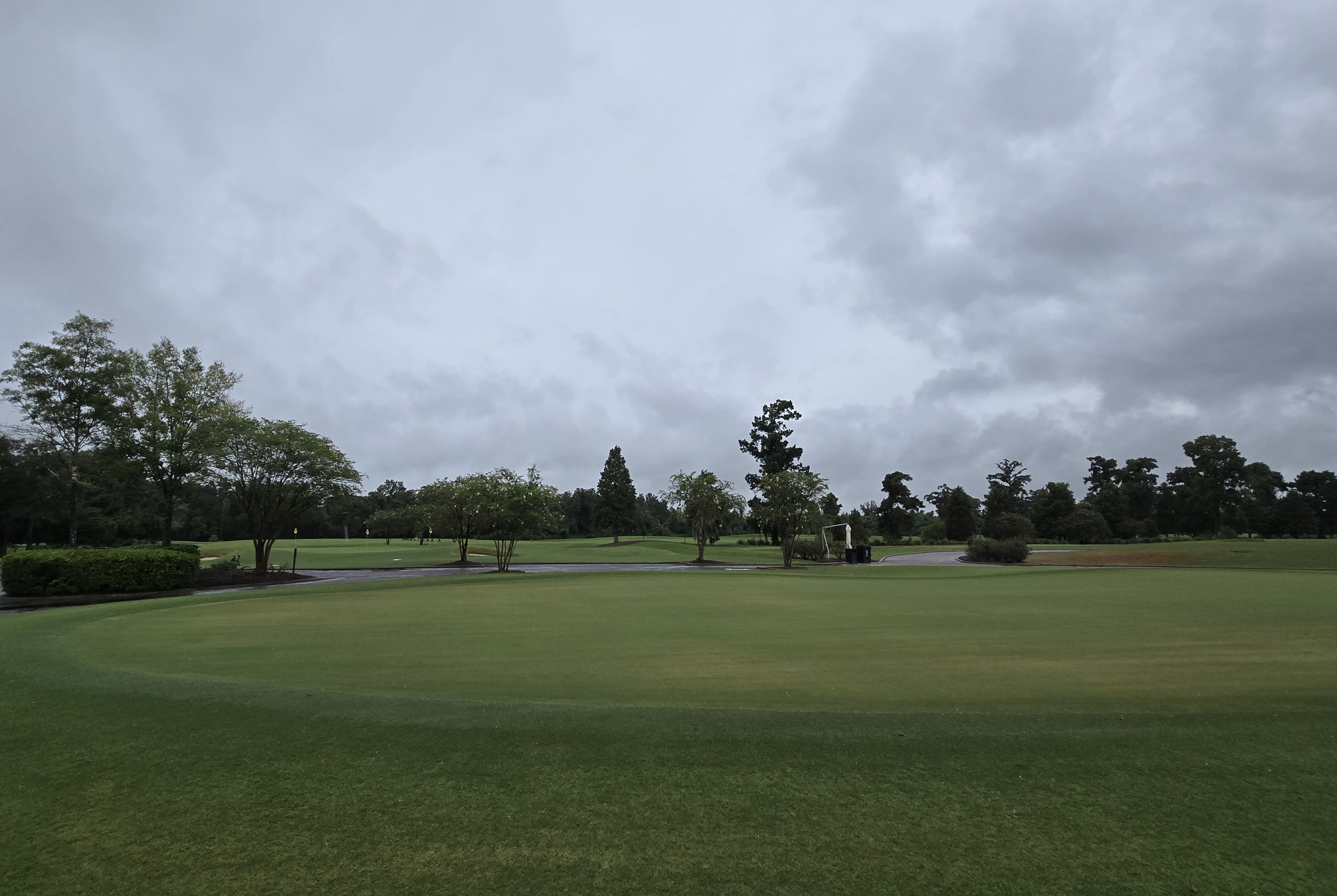
TPC Louisiana golf course near clubhouse

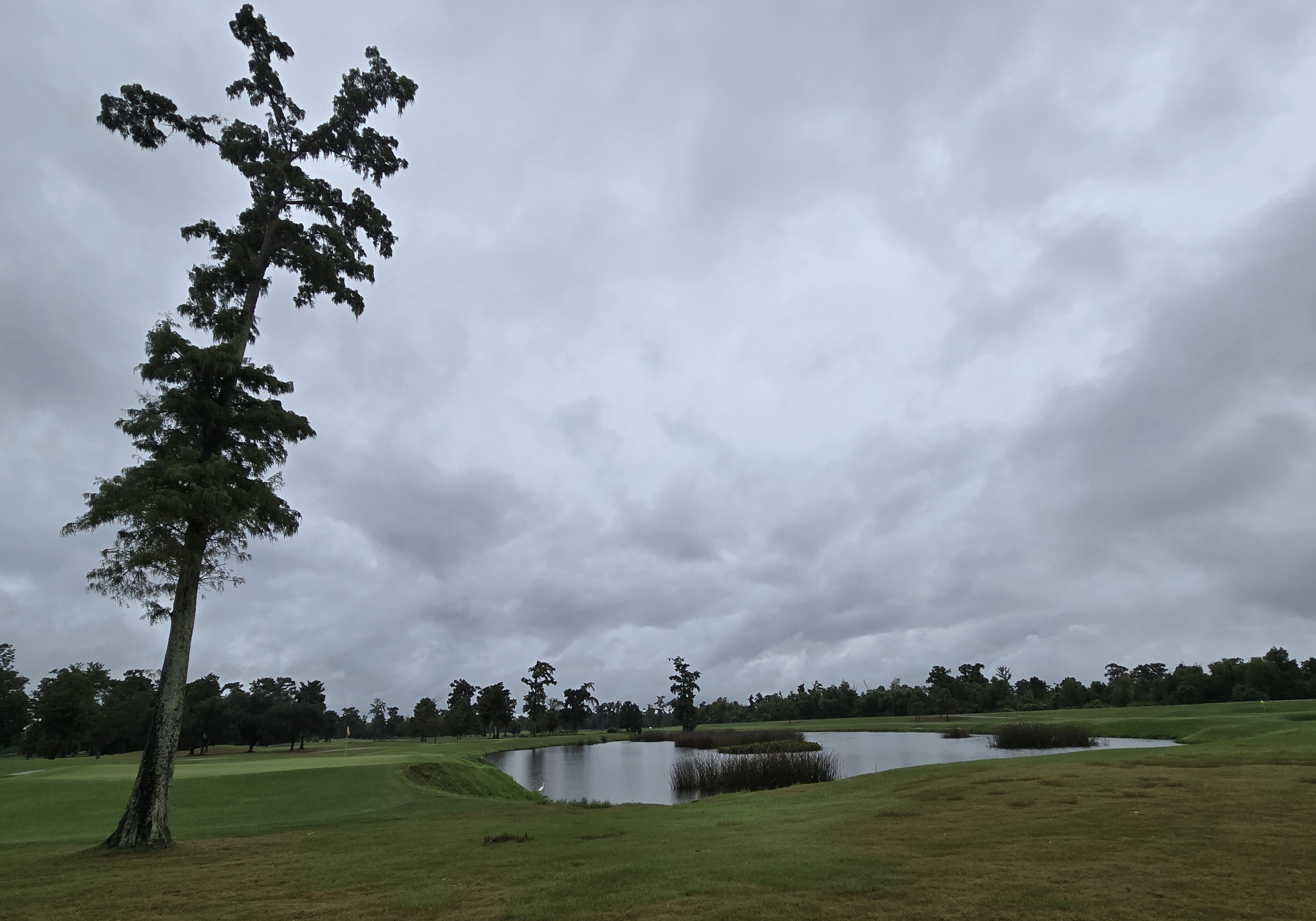
TPC Louisiana golf course with pond

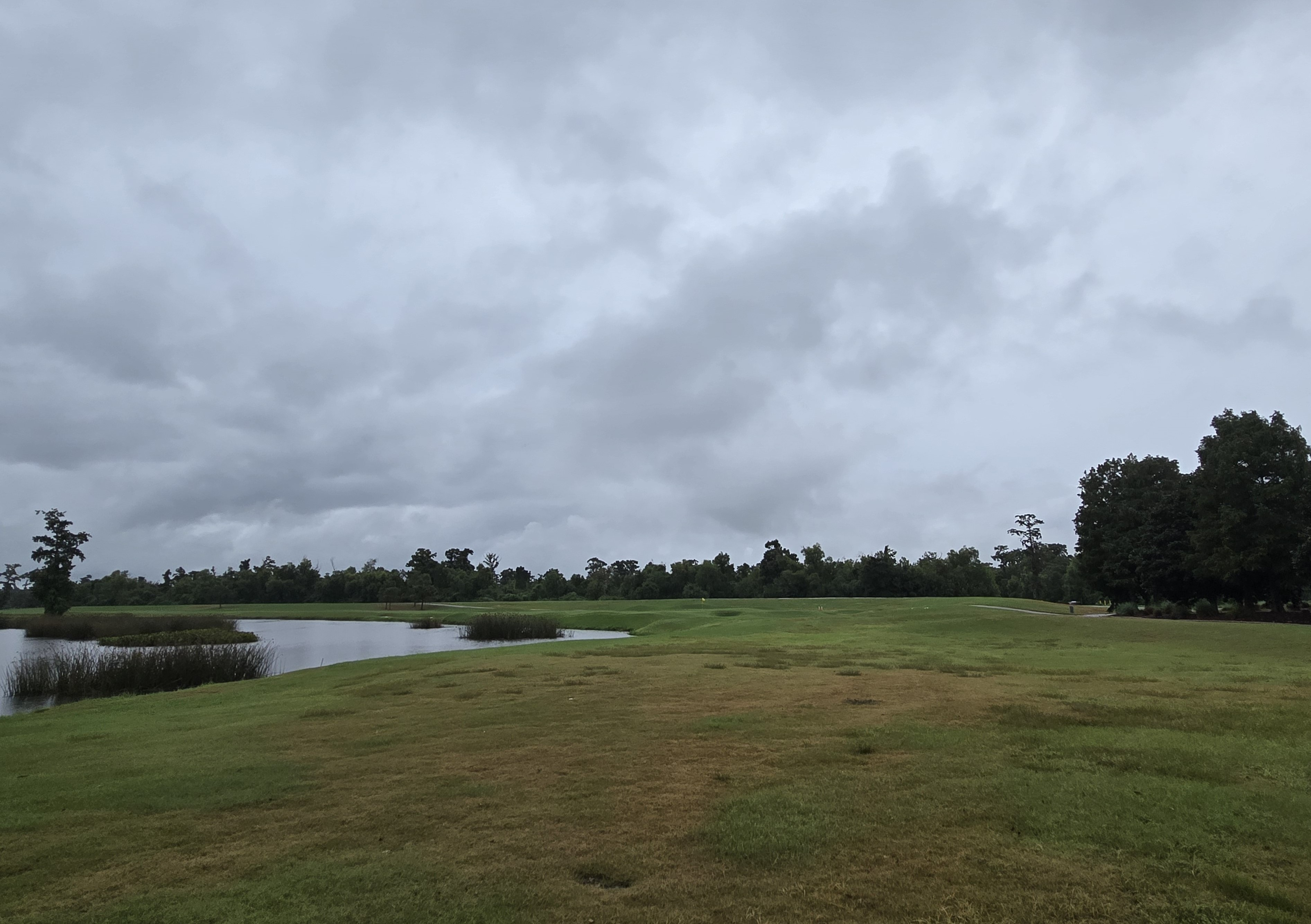
TPC Louisiana golf course

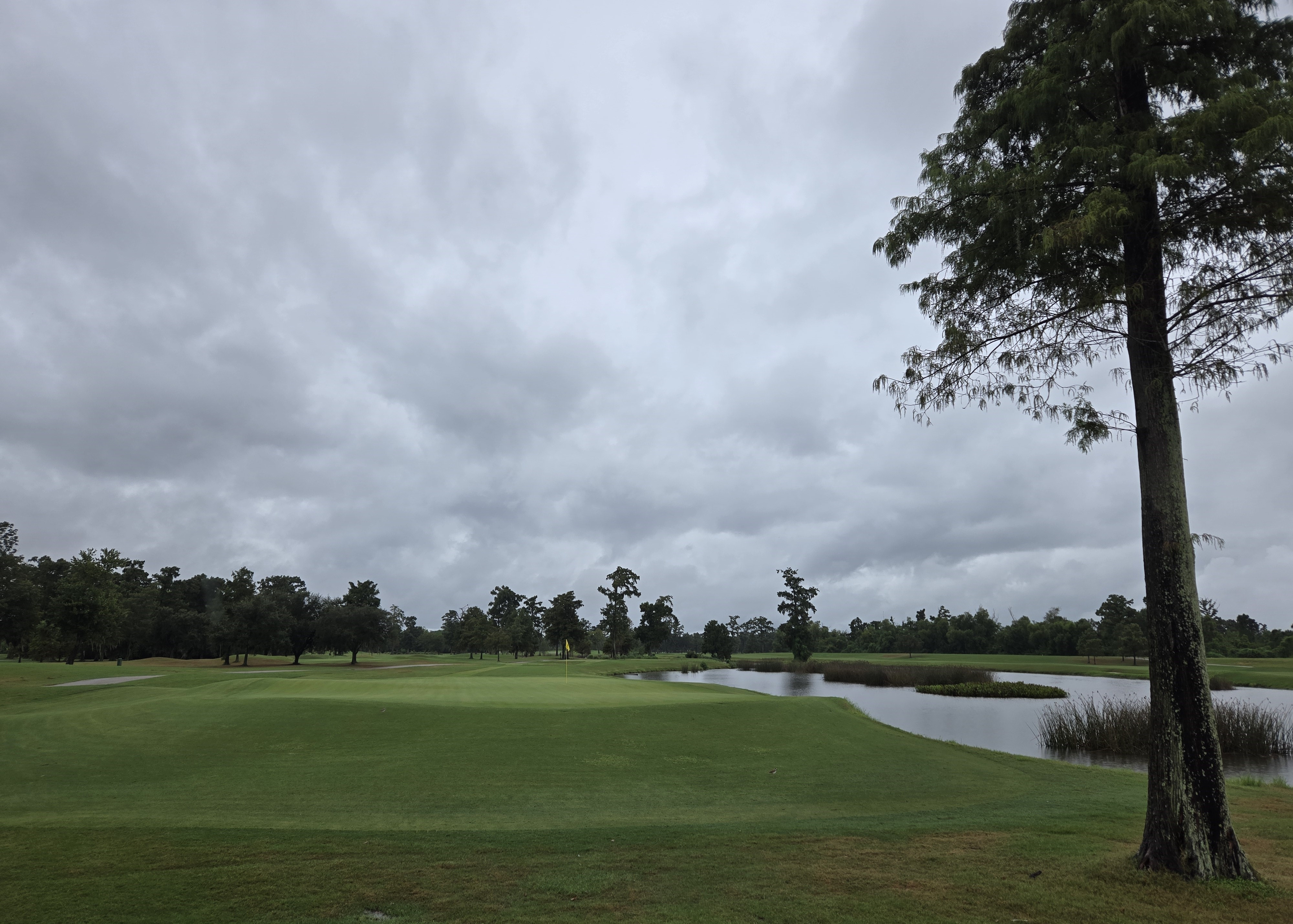
TPC Louisiana green
