= Danny Thiel Track =

Athletic facility in New Orleans, Louisiana

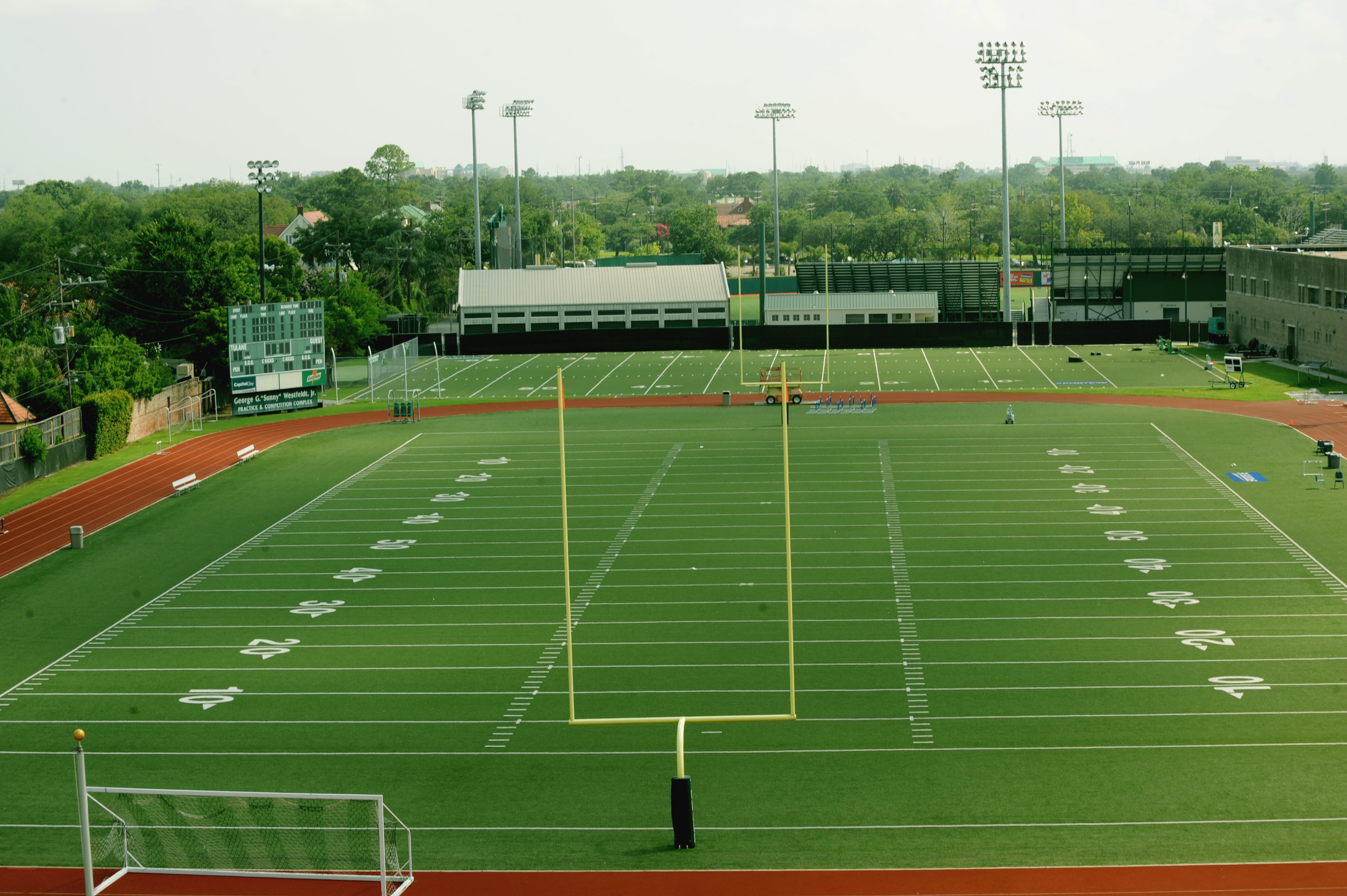
- Thiel Track located in the Westfeldt Practice and Competition Complex
- Interactive map of Danny Thiel Track
- Location: 77 Audubon Boulevard; New Orleans, Louisiana; USA
- Coordinates: 29.94482°N 90.116816°W
- Owner: Tulane University
- Operator: Tulane Athletics Department
- Capacity: 1,200

Tenant
- Tulane Green Wave (NCAA)

The Danny Thiel Track was an outdoor track and field facility that was part of the George G. Westfeldt Practice and Competition Complex located on the campus of Tulane University in New Orleans, Louisiana. The track hosted home meets and was the practice facility for the Tulane Green Wave men's and women's track and field teams. The stadium had a seating capacity of 1,200.

The track, which had a fully lit grandstand, hosted events and a number of track meets featuring teams from around the Gulf South. The adjacent Barney Mintz Auxiliary Field was also used for track and field events. In 2001, a new track was installed. The track and majority of the Westfeldt Practice and Competition Complex was demolished to build Yulman Stadium.

== See also ==
- Tulane Green Wave
