= Herman Neugass =

American track and field athlete

- Born: Herman Leo Neugass; January 10, 1915; Magnolia, Mississippi, US
- Died: August 31, 1991 (aged 76); Washington D.C., US
- Occupations: Collegiate track & field athlete Businessman; Economic consultant
- Known for: Boycott of the 1936 US Olympic Trials

Herman Leo Neugass (January 10, 1915 – August 31, 1991) was an American collegiate track and field athlete who was a record holder for a period of time in sprints. He is most noted for his refusal to participate in the Olympic trials for the 1936 Berlin Olympic Games because of his Jewish faith and objection to Nazi antisemitism. He also served various community service organizations in the Washington, D.C. area, especially for Jewish people and for combat veterans.

== Early life ==
Neugass was born in Magnolia, Mississippi, on January 10, 1915. Neugass's family moved to New Orleans, Louisiana, when he was a child. There, he attended Isidore Newman School. On enrolling at Tulane University, Neugass majored in mathematics and succeeded academically, being admitted to the Phi Beta Kappa honor society. He graduated in 1935 with a Bachelor of Science degree.

== Athletic career ==
In his collegiate athletic career, Neugass initially played competitive tennis before switching to track & field, specializing in sprints. Soon after starting college, Neugass was timed in sprints and then received an invitation to join the university's track team. He particularly succeeded in the 100 yard dash and the 220 yard dash. He set a world record of 9.4 seconds in the 100 yard dash. In the 1935 Southeastern Conference Championships, Neugass won the 220 yard dash with a time of 21.7 seconds.

Three times Neugass competed directly against Jesse Owens, then the most notable track & field sprinter, losing each time by 0.5 yards (0.46 m). The losses were attributed to Owens being more effective at starts.

Neugass's success in collegiate track & field earned Neugass the nicknames "Human Bullet" and "Green Wave Express". As an athlete at Tulane University, he was mentored by his coach Fritz Oakes who was reported to be a father figure for Neugass, his biological father having died when Neugass was 12 years old.

=== Boycott ===
His success as a competitor in track & field earned Neugass the right to compete in the 1936 United States Olympic Trials held in Flushing Meadows, New York. By then, the anti-semitism of the German Third Reich was widely known, and the Nuremberg Laws codifying antisemitism had already been passed in Germany. There was considerable recognition that the Third Reich was using the 1936 Olympics as a propaganda platform. At the time, Neugass was among the better known athletes to turn down the invitation to the Olympic trials due to the antisemitism. He advocated for a full boycott by the United States of the Berlin Olympics.

Neugass explained his position on the Olympic trials in an open letter to the editor of the New Orleans Times-Picayune newspaper which was published in December 1935, stating:

I would not participate in games in any country in which the fundamental principle of religious liberty is violated as flagrantly and as inhumanely as it has been in Germany. As an American citizen who believes sincerely in the cardinal tenet of freedom of religious worship embedded in the Constitution of the United States, I feel it to be my duty to express my unequivocal opinion that this country should not participate in the Olympic contests if they are held in Germany.

Neugass's actions were reported nationally, in the wake of the concern over the political situation in Germany at the time. Following public disclosure of his refusal to participate in the Olympic trials, Neugass received letters of support for his decision and letters of objection. These included opposition from other Jews in the southern United States who feared unnecessary attention to the antisemitism of the Third Reich and thereby avoid controversy.

Other notable individuals involved with the Olympics went along with the propaganda efforts of the Third Reich without objection, including Avery Brundage, who was chairman of the U.S. Olympic Committee and spoke in favor of the Hitler regime. It also included Charles Sherrill, who was a member of the Olympic committee. In 1936, United States Olympic Track & Field coach Lawson Robertson attempted to convince Neugass to change his mind, implying to Neugass that a position on the Olympic team was nearly assured.

== Post athletic career ==
Following his college graduation, Neugass initially pursued career opportunities in New Orleans but soon recognized that advancement was limited because of widespread antisemitism at the time. For that reason, Neugass relocated to Washington, D.C., where he went to work for Landsburgh's department stores. He became an executive in the chain, retiring from there in 1968. Lansburgh's was his wife's family's business enterprise, and in that way Neugass avoided antisemitism in his professional career.

In 1942, Neugass founded the Stamps for the Wounded project, an organization that provided postage stamps for wounded soldiers. He served as director of the project for 50 years, the project subsequently being administered by the Lions International Stamps Club.

In an event at the White House Rose Garden, Neugass stood with then United States President Jimmy Carter as Carter explained the 1980 Summer Olympics boycott against the Soviet Union. Carter stated that the 1980 boycott was a variation of the same principle as for the boycott of the 1936 Olympics. Carter's decision to include Neugass in the event reminded people of his 1935 actions which by then had faded from public attention, and in that respect re-invigorated public attention to Neugass's decision in 1935. At the time of the Rose Garden appearance, Neugass stated, "Sometimes you can shout 'fire' and not be heard, but it's still our duty to shout."

== Personal life ==
External media
- Media links for Herman Neugass

Images
- Photograph of Neugass sprinting in the 1930s, courtesy of the United States Holocaust Memorial Museum
- Photographs of Neugass as an athlete and later in life, courtesy of The Clarion-Ledger newspaper

Video
- Video biography of Neugass, at the Museum of the Southern Jewish Experience

After moving to Washington, Neugass joined the Department of Economic Development for the District of Columbia, where he specialized in minority issues. He also was a member of the Mayor's Economic Development Committee in Washington, and he was active in the Minority Business Advisers Association. He retired in 1981.

In his post-retirement life, Neugass served various roles in community service, Jewish advocacy organizations, and economic development groups. These included being a vice president and member of the board of directors of the United Jewish Appeal and the Handicraft Marketing Corp. He was on the boards of directors of the Jewish Community Center of Washington, D.C., the Junior Chamber of Commerce, and the District of Columbia Development Corp. He was a member of the Washington Board of Trade and Washington Hebrew Congregation.

Neugass was married to Nancy Neugass (née Goldsmith), with whom he had two children. Through his life, Neugass had the nickname "Neugie".

=== Death ===
Neugass died of leukemia at the Sibley Memorial Hospital in Washington, D.C., on August 31, 1991. Following his death, his son Richard Neugass represented him at various events, including a 1996 commemoration of Jewish athletes at the United States Holocaust Museum.

== Honors ==
In 1979, Neugass became a member of the Tulane University Athletics Hall of Fame. However, the Hall of Fame was destroyed in 2005 by Hurricane Katrina and not rebuilt as of 2022.

In 1992, Neugass was admitted to the Greater Washington Jewish Sports Hall of Fame. The same year, Neugass posthumously received the Kehr Award by the American Philatelic Society for his work on behalf of the Stamps for the Wounded project.
