= Nehemiah Atkinson =

American tennis player and coach (1918–2003)

- Born: September 8, 1918; Biloxi, Mississippi USA
- Died: February 9, 2003 (aged 84); Kenner, Louisiana, USA
- Occupations: Tennis coach Professional tennis player
- Known for: Community leader Teaching tennis to the underprivileged

Nehemiah Atkinson (1918–2003) was a professional tennis player and tennis coach in New Orleans, Louisiana USA. He managed public tennis facilities in New Orleans and played competitive tennis into old age. He was particularly noted for teaching young African-Americans, especially the underprivileged, to play the sport of tennis.

== Early life and education ==
Atkinson was born in 1918 in Biloxi, Mississippi, to parents C.C. Atkinson and Josephine Atkinson. He was the first of ten children in the family. Atkinson's family moved to New Orleans just before the Great Depression as his father became bishop of the Christ Holiness Church there. Atkinson attended New Orleans Public Schools, including two years of high school. He began playing tennis at age nine, learning without the benefit of professional instruction, being attracted to the sport despite its dominance by white people.

During World War II, Atkinson served in the United States Army's Black Corps of Engineers, which was responsible for building airstrips in Washington state, Alaska, and various locations in the south Pacific Ocean. Atkinson's role was as a medical corpsman for the 97th Engineer Regiment. He returned to New Orleans after his tour of military duty in December 1945. At that time, he studied offset printing at the Louisiana Industrial Training School in Farmerville, Louisiana.

Atkinson subsequently returned to New Orleans, where he obtained employment with the Dryades Street branch of the YMCA. Here he organized various activities, especially for young people. He established and taught tennis clinics for young people. During this time, he gained the attention of the local Coca-Cola Bottling Company which was a sponsor of the Dryades Street YMCA and gave Atkinson employment as a night supervisor.

== Tennis career ==
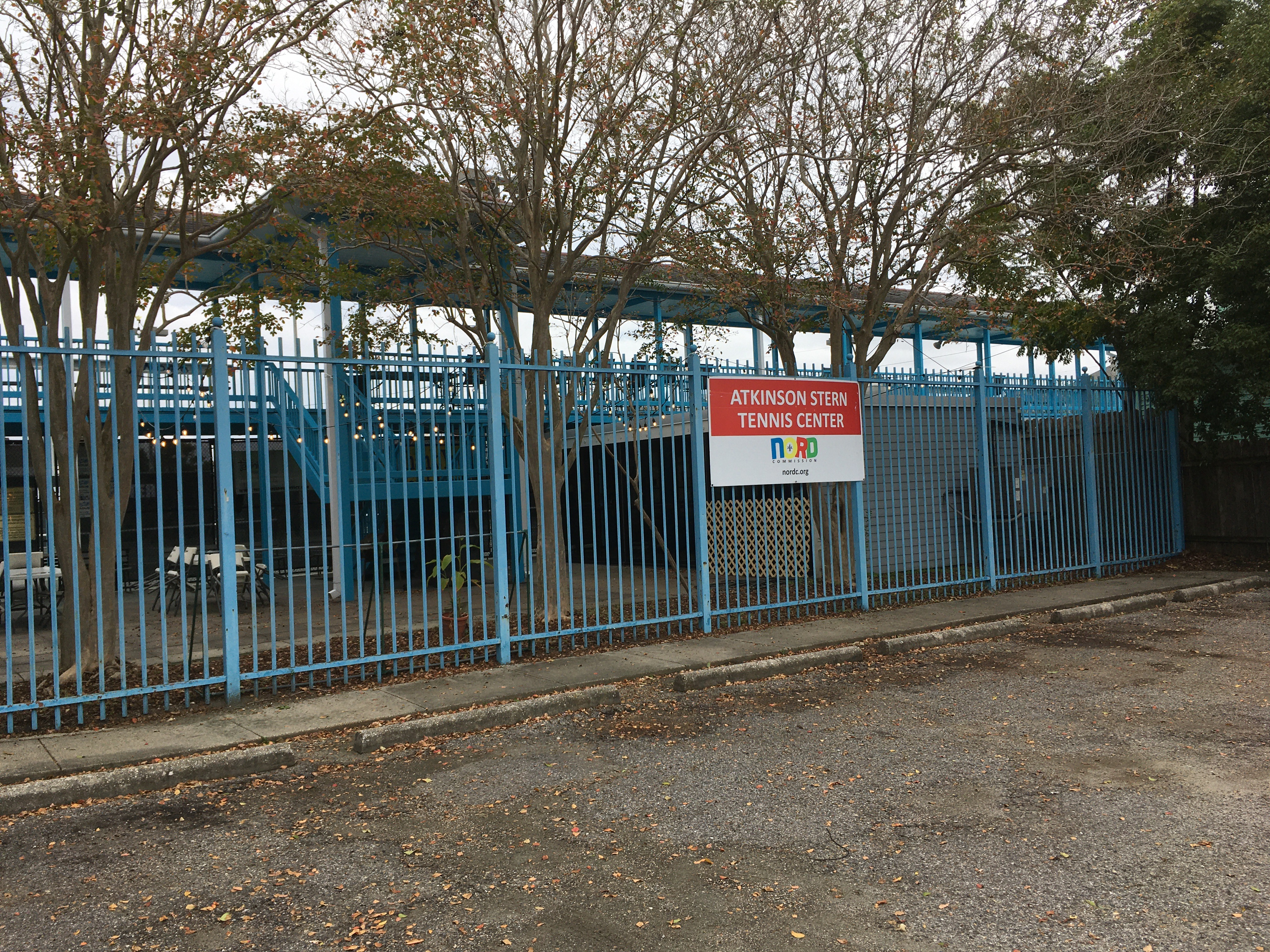
Atkinson - Stern Tennis Center in New Orleans

In 1947, as part of his experience with the Dryades Street YMCA, Atkinson co-founded the New Orleans Hard Court Tennis Club, which provided opportunities for African-Americans to play competitive tennis in the segregated society of the time. This included organizing tennis tournaments, often taking place at Xavier University, a historically black university.

In his early years of teaching tennis, due to limited resources, Atkinson sometimes used parking lots with a modified volleyball net instead of a tennis net as makeshift tennis courts. He taught youngsters the sport of tennis regardless of their ethnic background.

Atkinson participated in many tournaments sponsored by the American Tennis Association, and he also supported them by doing volunteer work on behalf of the association. This was before the time that the United States Tennis Association accepted African-American players, while the American Tennis Association promoted African-American participation in the sport. As a player, Atkinson won various regional tennis tournaments throughout the southern United States, winning approximately 15 tournament titles.

Following the 1974 relocation of the New Orleans Lawn Tennis Club, the former location became the Stern Tennis Center, a part of the New Orleans Recreation Department. This facility, on South Saratoga Street in New Orleans, welcomed African-Americans to play tennis. Atkinson became the manager of the facility, a position he held until his retirement in 1995. At the time of his retirement, Lloyd Dillon became manager of the facility, whom Atkinson has mentored for the position.

Atkinson's notable tennis students included Chanda Rubin and Sharon Pettis, who later became the tennis coach at Marquette University. He also helped Pettis obtain a scholarship from the Southern University men's tennis team, an indication that he broke boundaries in both race and gender relations. Pettis later worked as a tennis instructor for the New Orleans Recreation Department as did Atkinson.

Atkinson wrote a column for the Louisiana Weekly newspaper, with a readership of mostly African-American tennis players, entitled "Hard Court Tennis Notes".

=== Experience with segregation ===
Much of Atkinson's career coincided with the era of the Jim Crow South, and he frequently was taunted at integrated tennis tournaments in which he participated. He had urine-filled tennis balls and other objects thrown at him. He received inappropriate foot-fault calls and sometimes was verbally abused by tournament officials.

After segregation in the Deep South subsided, Atkinson became a member of the New Orleans Lawn Tennis Club, from which he had previously been excluded for racial reasons. This was the most prestigious tennis facility in New Orleans at the time. As of 2019, the New Orleans Lawn Tennis Club was also the oldest tennis club in the United States (founded in 1876), and it had become racially integrated only in 1986.

In the 1960s, local tennis player Harry Anisgard sponsored Atkinson for membership in the formerly all-white New Orleans City Park Tennis Club. In reprisal, Anisgard was dismissed from the club. The club had regrets soon afterward, and re-admitted Anisgard to the club, ironically with Atkinson's sponsorship.

=== Senior tennis ===
As a senior tennis player, Atkinson won the Men’s 65 Singles Championships in both 1989 and 1990 sponsored by the United States Professional Tennis Registry. He subsequently won the Men’s 70+ Singles in 1994 through 1997 and then again in 2000 and 2001. In 1993, Atkinson was named Player of the Year for the United States Professional Tennis Registry.

In 1999, Atkinson won the 80s National Hard Court Championship in San Diego, California, and, with a doubles partner, the World International Senior Tennis Championship in Barcelona, Spain. In 2001, he won the World Men's 80s Grasscourt Championship, held in Perth, Australia.

With regard to his success in senior competitive tennis, Atkinson stated:

"I’ve got better wheels than most people I play. Also, I play a lot of young folks and I’m simply out on the court a lot. Tennis keeps you young. It stimulates your heart, keeps your body in shape and your eyes sharp."

== Later life ==
Atkinson died of cancer at the Kenner Regional Medical Center in 2003 and was then interred at the Biloxi National Cemetery.

== Honors and recognition ==
The Atkinson-Stern Tennis Center of the New Orleans Recreation Department, located in uptown New Orleans, is named in honor of Atkinson and philanthropist Edgar B. Stern.

Atkinson served as a pallbearer at the funeral of tennis star Arthur Ashe.

In 1977, Atkinson received the Robert F. Kennedy Memorial Ripple of Hope Award. He was the first African-American to be inducted into the Southern Tennis Hall of Fame.

In 2000, Atkinson was inducted into the Greater New Orleans Sports Hall of Fame.

The Louisiana Tennis Association awards the Nehemiah Atkinson Diversity and Inclusion Champion Award in Atkinson's honor. The Professional Tennis Registry Foundation awards the Nehemiah Atkinson Humanitarian Grant, given to an individual distinguished by actions aimed at improving the lives of others. As a senior tennis player, he received the T.N. Touchstone, Jr. Memorial Trophy, awarded for his sportsmanship and support of southern tennis.
