= Edgar B. Stern =

Businessperson and civic leader (1886–1959)

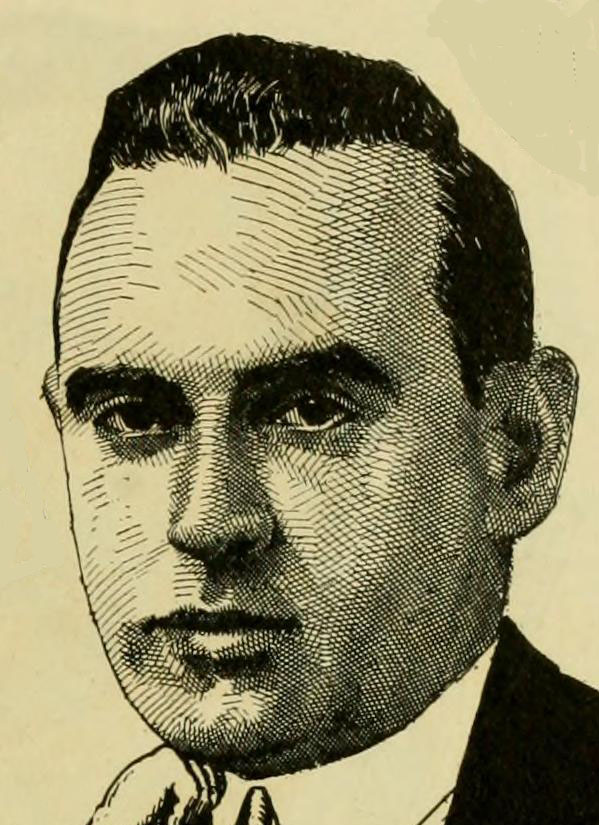
- 1917 caricature
- Born: Edgar Bloom Stern; January 23, 1886; New Orleans, Louisiana, US
- Died: August 24, 1959 (aged 73); Price, Utah, US
- Education: Harvard University
- Occupation: Businessperson
- Known for: Philanthropy, civic leadership
- Spouse: Edith Rosenwald Stern
- Children: 3

Edgar Bloom Stern Sr. (1886–1959) was an American leader in civic, racial, business and governmental affairs for the city of New Orleans, Louisiana. He was successful at an early age in the cotton business in New Orleans, later diversifying into other businesses. Stern was an organizer of Dillard University, Flint Goodridge Hospital, and the Bureau for Governmental Research. Stern's family home, Longue Vue House and Gardens, is now a museum open to the public.

== Early life and education ==
Edgar Stern was born in 1886 in New Orleans as the second son of Maurice Stern and Hannah Bloom Stern. His family was Jewish. Maurice had immigrated to New Orleans from Germany in 1871, beginning employment with cotton factors in the city. Maurice Stern succeeded in the cotton trade, and by 1883 his firm of employment bore his name, Lehman, Stern and Company. Maurice married Hannah Bloom in 1883, and his family benefited financially from his success as a cotton merchant.

For his family's affluence, Edgar Stern traveled frequently, became involved in charitable works, and became active in Temple Sinai synagogue, all beginning in early childhood. Stern attended New Orleans public schools, and subsequently enrolled in Tulane University. However, after one year, he transferred to Harvard University, where he obtained a scholarship. At Harvard, Stern earned a BA in 1907 and an MA in 1908.

== Career and philanthropy ==
=== Business and civic affairs ===
Following his 1907 graduation from Harvard University, Stern began his employment with Lehman, Stern and Company in New Orleans in the cotton trade. Stern served as president of the New Orleans Cotton Exchange in 1927 and 1928. He also became involved in civic affairs, being elected to the Orleans Parish School Board and the Board of Directors for Charity Hospital of New Orleans in 1912. His involvement in business matters extended beyond cotton trading, and so he was elected president of the New Orleans Association of Commerce in 1915, a forerunner of the local Chamber of Commerce. Stern also became a director of the New Orleans Public Belt Railroad in 1916.

During World War I, Stern served as a captain in the US Army's ordinance department. He was a director of the Federal Reserve Bank of Atlanta and director of the New Orleans branch of the Federal Reserve Bank in 1917 and 1918. During World War II, Stern served as the chairman of the transportation committee of the United States War Production Board, a position that he held for a salary of $1 per year. As part of his endeavors in international trade, Stern was a founder of International House in New Orleans in the mid-1940s. He served as a member of the board of directors of Sears, Roebuck and Company from 1932 to 1958. He was also a member of the boards of directors for Tulane University and for the New Orleans Times-Picayune newspaper. He was a trustee of the Howard-Tilton Memorial Library from 1932 to 1948. Stern was a trustee of the Julius Rosenwald Fund and of the Tuskegee Institute, in addition to being a member of the American Academy of Political and Social Science.

In 1933, Stern was a founder of a bureau aimed at improving local government efficiency, especially for New Orleans. This organization later evolved into the Bureau of Governmental Research.

In 1947 Stern and his family purchased New Orleans radio station WDSU from the Stephens Broadcasting Co. Stern, together with his son Edgar Jr., then opened WDSU-TV one year later, its first broadcast being on December 18, 1948. This television station was the first in Louisiana, the 6th major television station in the South, and one of the first 50 stations in the United States.

Author Gerda Weissmann Klein published a list of business and civic positions that Stern held as of 1953.

=== Dillard University ===
Stern's involvement with Dillard University and Flint-Goodridge Hospital began with a solicitation in 1928 by Edwin R. Embree, then president of the Rosenwald Fund, concerning the educational and health care needs of African-Americans in the city of New Orleans. At about the same time, the president of Straight College sought Stern's financial aid for the college. A possible merger of historically black Straight College and New Orleans University was under discussion by leaders of each institution, reasoning that each was fairly weak but the combined universities would be strong. Additionally, the Rosenwald Fund was interested in developing centers for education of African-Americans, believing that New Orleans could be one of those centers if the two institutions merged. Edith Stern's biographer Gerda Weissmann Klein wrote that, while Edgar Stern had no prior convictions about African-American affairs, "he had strong convictions about right and wrong, along with a keen perception of social injustice, the debris of which was all around him". These circumstances led to Stern's immersion in addressing the educational needs of African-Americans.

The merger of the two colleges, together with the New Orleans University-operated Flint Goodridge Hospital, was completed in 1930 with Stern as a key member of the board of trustees, and later board president. As board member, Stern addressed several critical issues facing the newly formed Dillard University, including financial matters, navigating the distinctly different cultures of the two parent colleges, appointing effective administrators, and developing a suitable physical plant, including a new campus. On financial matters, the board of trustees under Stern's leadership obtained $2 million in funding, with a new campus in the Gentilly section of New Orleans and a new hospital in the uptown section of New Orleans. These site selections were complex matters that he negotiated with local government officials and were sensitive because of perceived impact of negro institutions on local property values in the Deep South at the time. Stern chose to pursue construction of the hospital complex first, with it opening in 1931 and with the new campus for Dillard University opening for the Fall semester of 1935.

Stern selected Will W. Alexander to be the first president of the newly formed Dillard University. Alexander was the southern white director of the Commission on Interracial Cooperation, whom Stern viewed as being able to navigate the complex racial relations of white-dominated New Orleans and the factionalism that persisted from the two universities from which Dillard was formed. Alexander retained his position on the Commission on Interracial Cooperation while serving as university president, which did not adequately serve the university's interests. In 1936, Stern and the board of trustees, therefore, replaced Alexander with William Stuart Nelson, the university's first full-time and first African-American president. However, financial difficulties persisted, and Stern subsequently appointed Albert W. Dent as the new president in 1940. Dent had been Stern's protégé during his tenure as chief executive at Flint-Goodridge Hospital, and Dent's presidency lasted until his retirement in 1969. Through his relationship with Dent, Stern's outlook on racial matters became increasingly progressive.

=== Other philanthropy ===
Shortly following World War II, Stern and his wife Edith were part of the group that founded Pontchartrain Park, a New Orleans housing sub-division specifically for African-Americans, the first in the New Orleans area and one of the first in the United States. This was initially a $15 million, 1000-home development in the Gentilly section of New Orleans.

Stern and his wife Edith Stern made significant financial contributions to Dillard University, Tulane University, Harvard University, and the New Orleans Philharmonic Symphony. With a $145,000 grant in 1955, he funded a project by the Governmental Affairs Institute of Washington, DC, a project to compile statistics on elections in the United States.

Stern was personally interested in the sport of tennis. Stern provided financial assistance that later enabled the New Orleans Recreation Department to acquire the former site of the New Orleans Lawn Tennis Club. The facility in this way became the Atkinson - Stern Tennis Center. This acquisition made the sport of tennis accessible to underprivileged people, especially underprivileged African-Americans.

== Personal life ==
In 1921, Stern married Edith Sulzberger (1895-1980) (née Rosenwald), daughter of Sears Roebuck magnate and philanthropist Julius Rosenwald. Each of their children were notable in their own rights. Stern gave each of the three children money to begin their own foundations.

Son Philip M. Stern (1926–1992) was a Democratic Party activist, philanthropist, and writer. His books included criticisms of the political establishment and the legal profession, and he wrote treatises on poverty. His noted books included "The Best Congress Money can Buy" and "The Oppenheimer Case", among others. He died in 1992 at age 66.

Daughter Audrey Stern Hess (1924–1974) served as director and as president of the Citizens' Committee for Children, in addition to being president of the National Girls Club. She served as a trustee to the John F. Kennedy Library and held board memberships at the Eleanor Roosevelt Foundation and the Osborne Association. Hess was appointed by the Kennedy Administration and the Johnson Administration to advisory positions for the Federal Reformatory for Women and the National Council on Alcoholism. She was married to art critic and author Thomas B. Hess. Audrey Hess died in 1974 at age 50.

First son Edgar Bloom Stern Jr. (1922–2008) served in the US Army's Signal Officer Corps in World War II and in the Korean War. With Edgar Sr, he founded WDSU-TV, the first commercial television station in the Gulf Coast region of the United States. Through his Royal Street Corporation, Edgar Jr pursued real estate developments, especially in New Orleans and Aspen, Colorado. He lived in Aspen and on the San Juan Islands from 1968 until his death.

For his merits early in his career, Edgar Bloom Stern Sr. was invited to join the exclusive Boston Club of New Orleans, despite its reputation at the time for antisemitism. Stern declined the invitation on learning that close Jewish friends would be unable to join. Stern continued to prosper in New Orleans business circles even though he was excluded from much of the city's society because of the widespread antisemitism of the time.

Stern's brother S. Walter Stern was also in the cotton business and was a philanthropist in the city of New Orleans.

== Legacy ==
In 1936, Edgar and Edith Stern founded the Stern Family Foundation, ultimately distributing $25 million. Believing that foundations became bureaucratic if they persisted too long, Edgar Stern and Edith Stern chartered the Stern Family Foundation to spend itself out of existence. The spending was complete in 1986. The fund was noted for sometimes supporting unconventional causes. For example, in addition to its support for inner-city causes, it on occasion supported challenges by shareholders to encourage social responsibility of corporations, public-interest law firms, tenant groups, and the anti-nuclear movement. It preceded other foundations in supporting black voter registration in the Deep South.

Edgar Stern and his wife Edith Stern built a home in suburban New Orleans, Louisiana, during the period 1939–1942, intending from the start to open the house to the public as an educational institution. The home was built in Classical Revival style. The home was partially opened to the public in 1968 and fully opened as a museum and gardens in 1980. Edgar Stern and wife Edith Stern also maintained a summer home in Lenox, Massachusetts.

=== Awards and honors ===
In 1930 the New Orleans Times-Picayune newspaper presented Stern with its Loving Cup Award for his service in founding Dillard University. A replica of the trophy is on his tomb at Metairie Cemetery in New Orleans. Government, civic, and religious leaders gathered in New Orleans in 1953 to recognize Stern's philanthropic accomplishments. In the presentation, then New Orleans Mayor deLesseps S. Morrison referred to Stern as "Mr. Citizen of 1953". The Stern Science Hall at Dillard University was dedicated in 1953. The Edgar B. Stern Tennis Center in New Orleans is named in his honor, which was subsequently renamed the Atkinson-Stern Tennis Center to commemorate Nehemiah Atkinson.

== Gallery ==
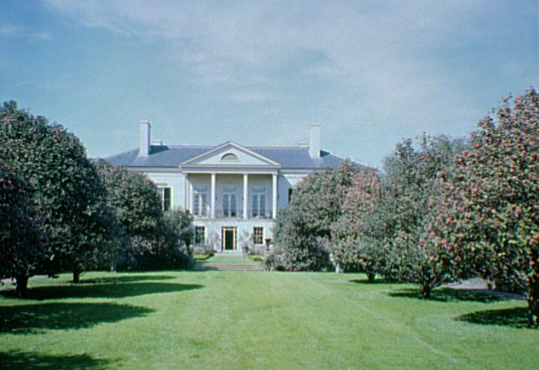
1947 Home of Edgar Stern at Longue Vue Gardens

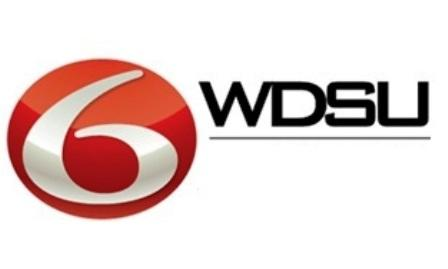
WDSU-TV logo, station founded by Stern

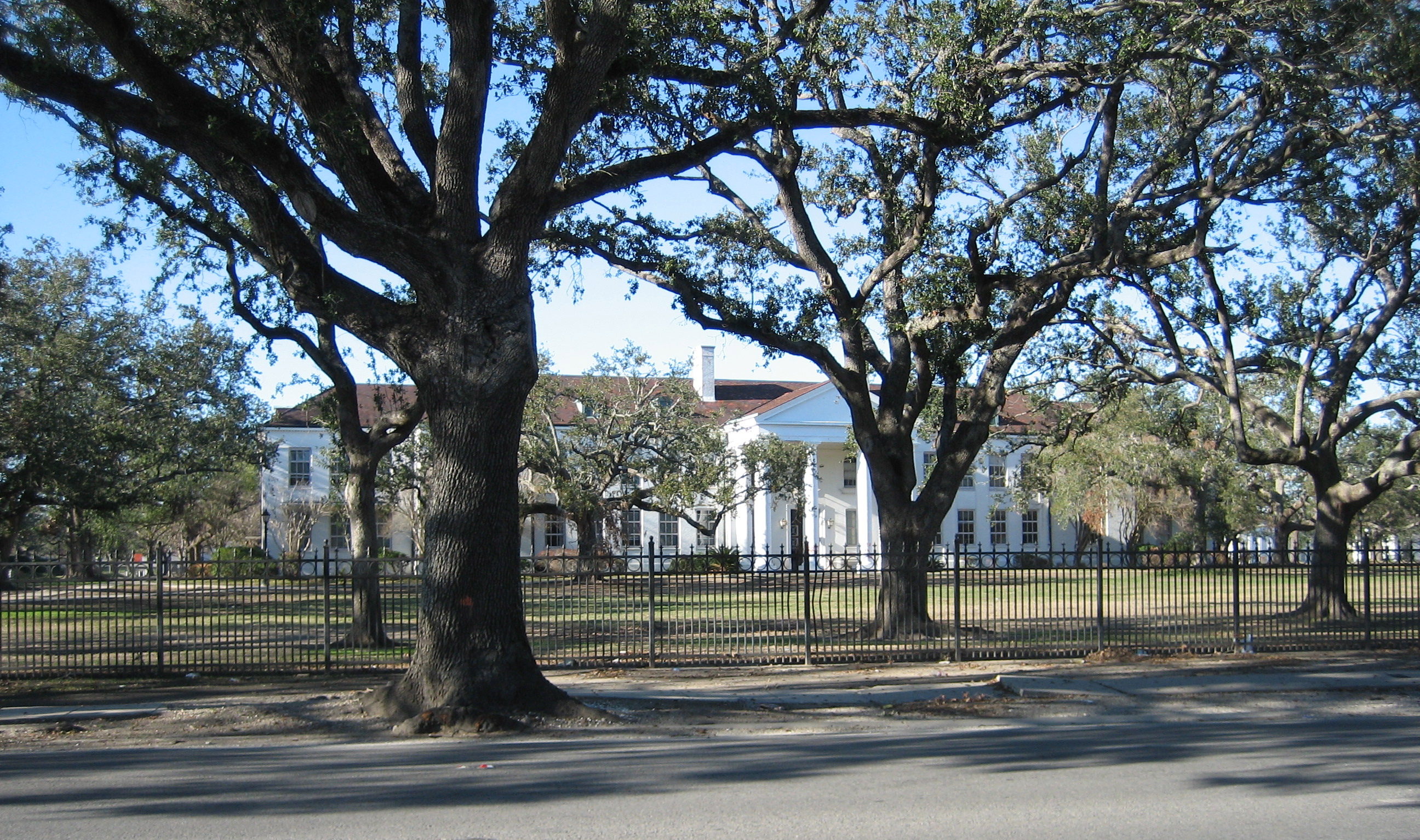
Dillard University

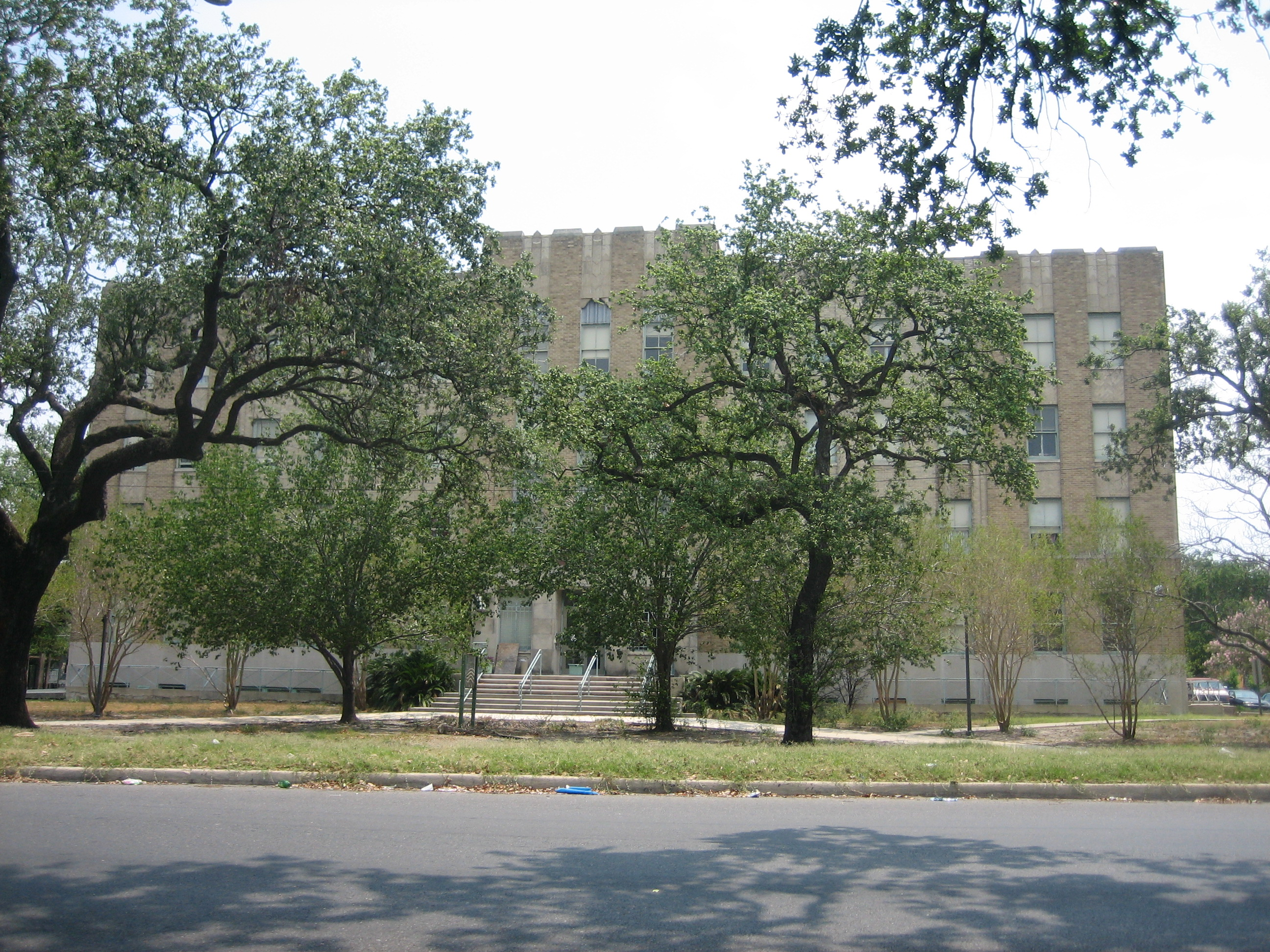
Flint-Goodridge Hospital Building as it appeared in 2006

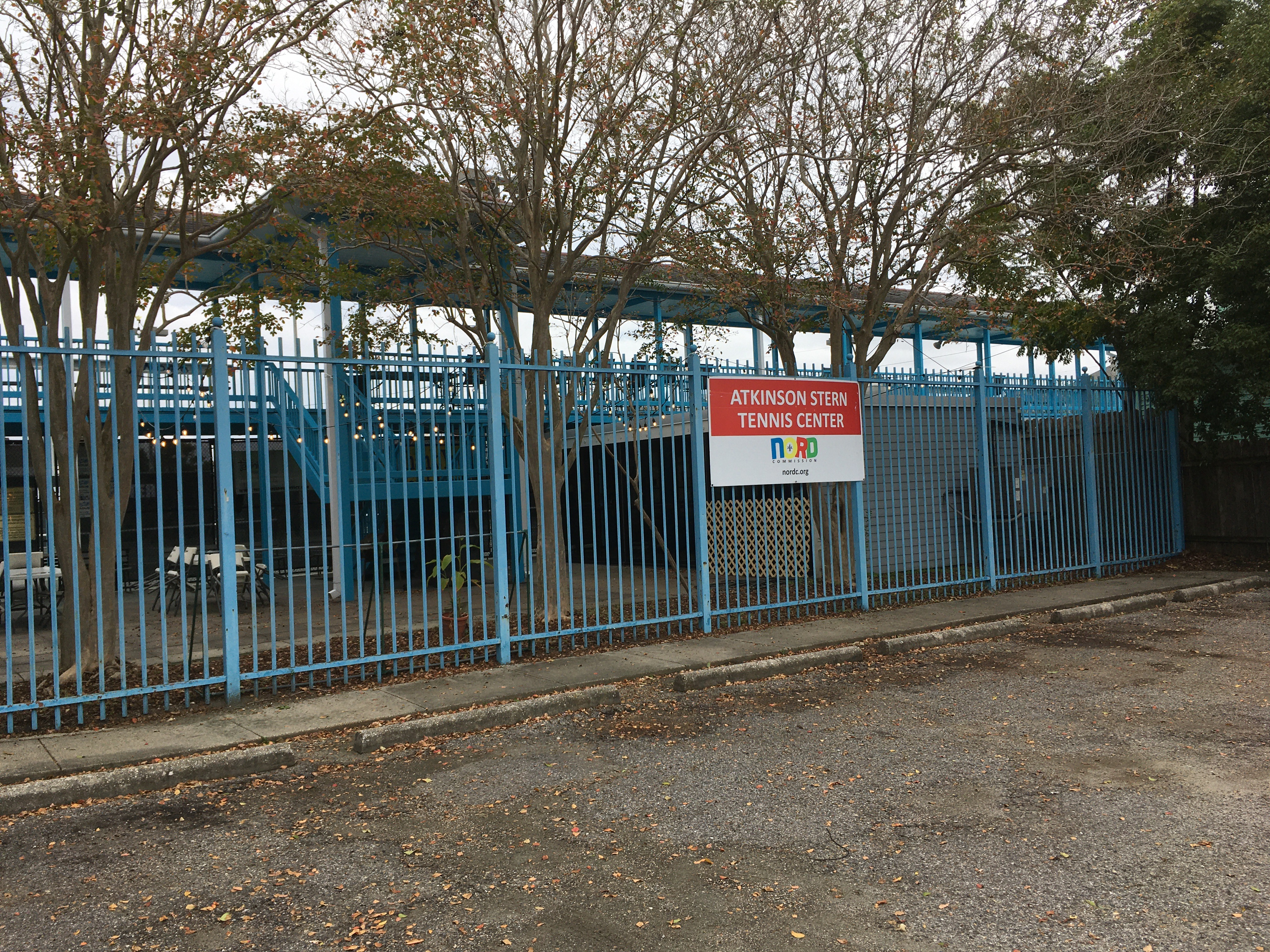
Entrance to the Atkinson - Stern Tennis Center in Uptown New Orleans

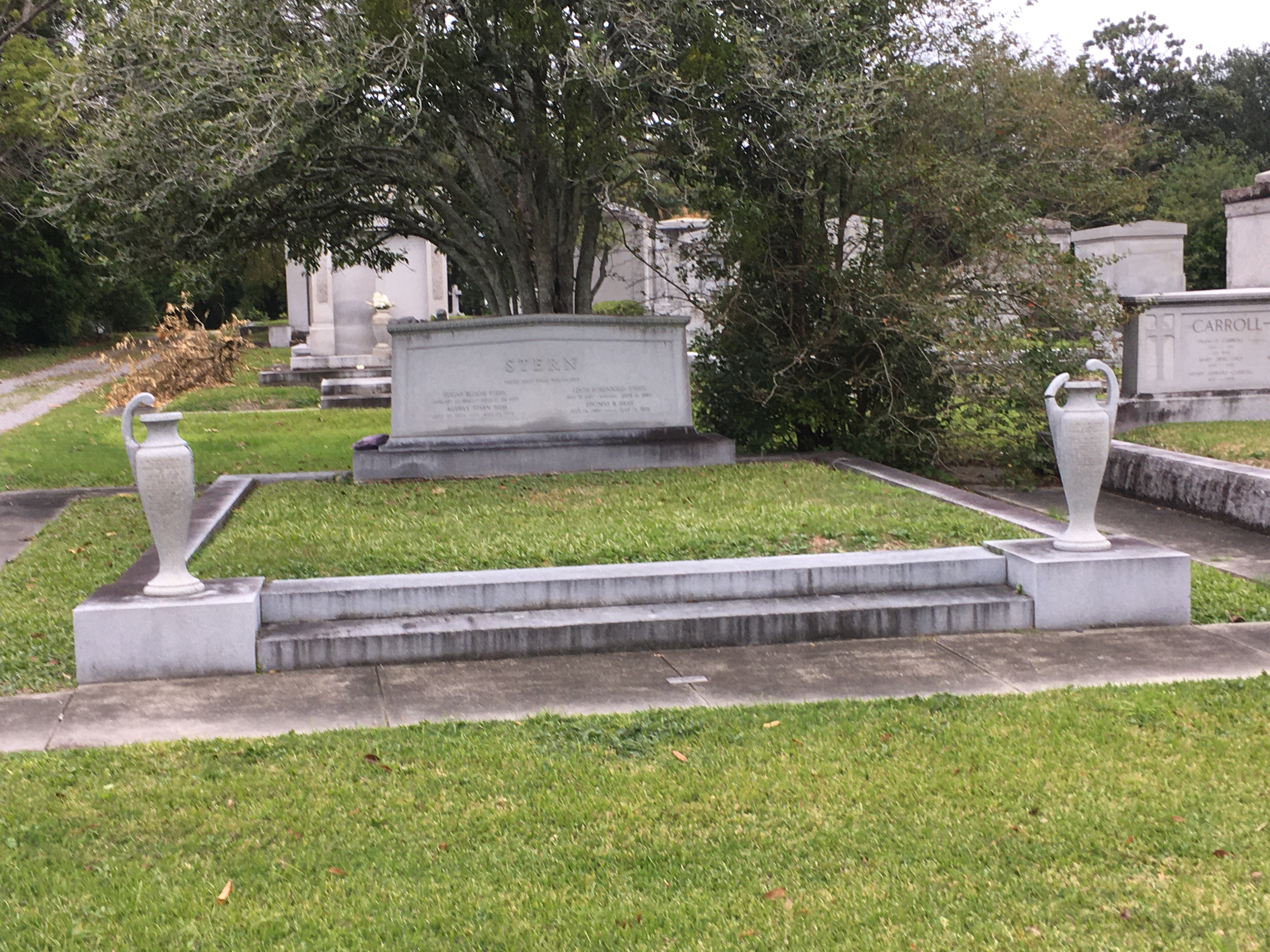
Stern family tomb
