= Lester Lautenschlaeger =

American football player and coach and politician (1904–1986)

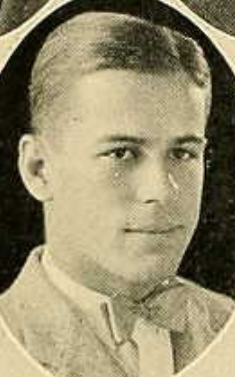
- Lester Lautenschlaeger

Tulane Green Wave
- Position: Quarterback

Personal information
- Born: May 27, 1904; New Orleans, Louisiana, U.S.
- Died: August 5, 1986 (aged 82); New Orleans, Louisiana, U.S.

Career information
- College: Tulane (1922–1925)

Awards and highlights
- Third-team All-American (1925); Tulane Athletics Hall of Fame (1977); Louisiana Sports Hall of Fame (1983)
- College Football Hall of Fame (Class of 1975)

Lester Joseph Lautenschlaeger (May 27, 1904 – August 5, 1986) was an American football player and coach and politician. He played at the quarterback position at Tulane University from 1922 to 1925, served as an assistant football coach at Tulane from 1929 to 1935, and served in the Louisiana House of Representatives from 1928 to 1932. He was inducted to the College Football Hall of Fame in 1975, the Tulane Athletics Hall of Fame in 1977, and the Louisiana Sports Hall of Fame in 1983.

== Early life ==
Lautenschlaeger was born in New Orleans, Louisiana, in 1904.

== Tulane University ==
=== Athlete ===
Lautenschlaeger enrolled at Tulane University in New Orleans in 1922 and played for the Tulane Green Wave football team from 1922 to 1925. In 1922, he was selected by head coach Clark Shaughnessy to play quarterback. That year, he returned a kickoff 95 yards for a touchdown against North Carolina. With Lautenschlaeger as the starting quarterback, the Tulane football team lost only one game in 1924 and compiled a 9-0-1 record in 1925. At the end of the 1925 season, he was selected as a third-team All-American by Grantland Rice for Collier's Weekly.

In January 1935, after defeating Temple in the inaugural Sugar Bowl, Lautenschlaeger helped organize a local team to play the Chicago Bears in an exhibition game in New Orleans. C. C. Pyle offered Lautenschlaeger $6,000 to organize the local team. When Pyle failed to deliver the second half of the funds at the start of halftime, Lautenschlaeger reported to the writers in the press box that there would be no second half if Pyle did not come up with the payment. Pyle promptly delivered the remaining sum to Lautenschaeger's father.

=== Coach ===
The administration at Tulane objected to its athletes being involved in a professional game and terminated its relationship with Lautenschlaeger after the barnstorming match with the Bears. By 1929, Lautenschlaeger and the Tulane administration had mended their relationship, and Lautenschlaeger had become an assistant football coach. During a 1929 game against Georgia, Lautenschlaeger reportedly berated his team, threw his hat to the ground, stomped on it, and yelled, “Georgia! I can lick the whole state of Georgia by myself!" Tulane head coach Bernie Bierman also stomped on Lautenschlaeger's hat, and Tulane defeated Georgia and went on to an undefeated season with a 9–0 record.

Lautenschlaeger remained affiliated with Tulane as an assistant football coach for many years. As a co-coach with Ted Cox, Lautenschlaeger helped lead the 1934 Tulane team to a tie for the Southeastern Conference championship and a victory over Temple in the inaugural 1935 Sugar Bowl. “After the 1935 Tulane team compiled a 6-4 record and lost to LSU by a 41-0 score in the final game, Cox and Lautenschlaeger were fired.

== Later life ==
Lautenschlaeger earned a law degree from the Tulane University School of Law. He subsequently practiced law in New Orleans. From 1928 to 1931, he also served in the Louisiana House of Representatives. From 1947 to 1970, he was the director of the New Orleans Recreation Department (NORD). He served on the Tulane University Board of Administrators from 1953 to 1973.

Lautenschlaeger was inducted into the College Football Hall of Fame in 1975. Two years later, when Tulane established its Athletics Hall of Fame in 1977, Lautenschlaeger was one of the inaugural inductees. He was also inducted into the Louisiana Sports Hall of Fame in 1983. He died in 1986 in New Orleans at age 82.
