= University Sports Complex =

Multi-purpose arena in New Orleans, Louisiana

- The Den
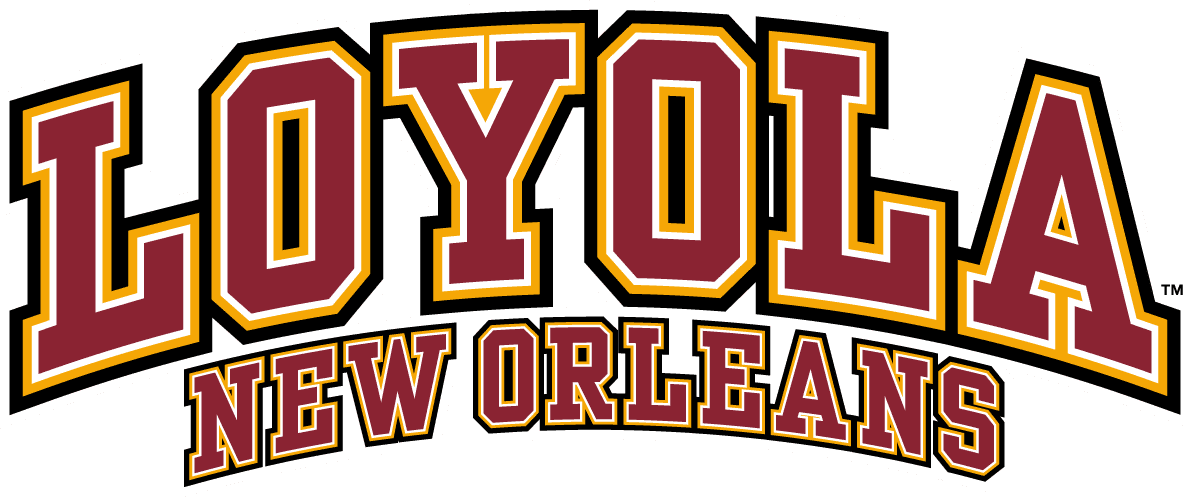

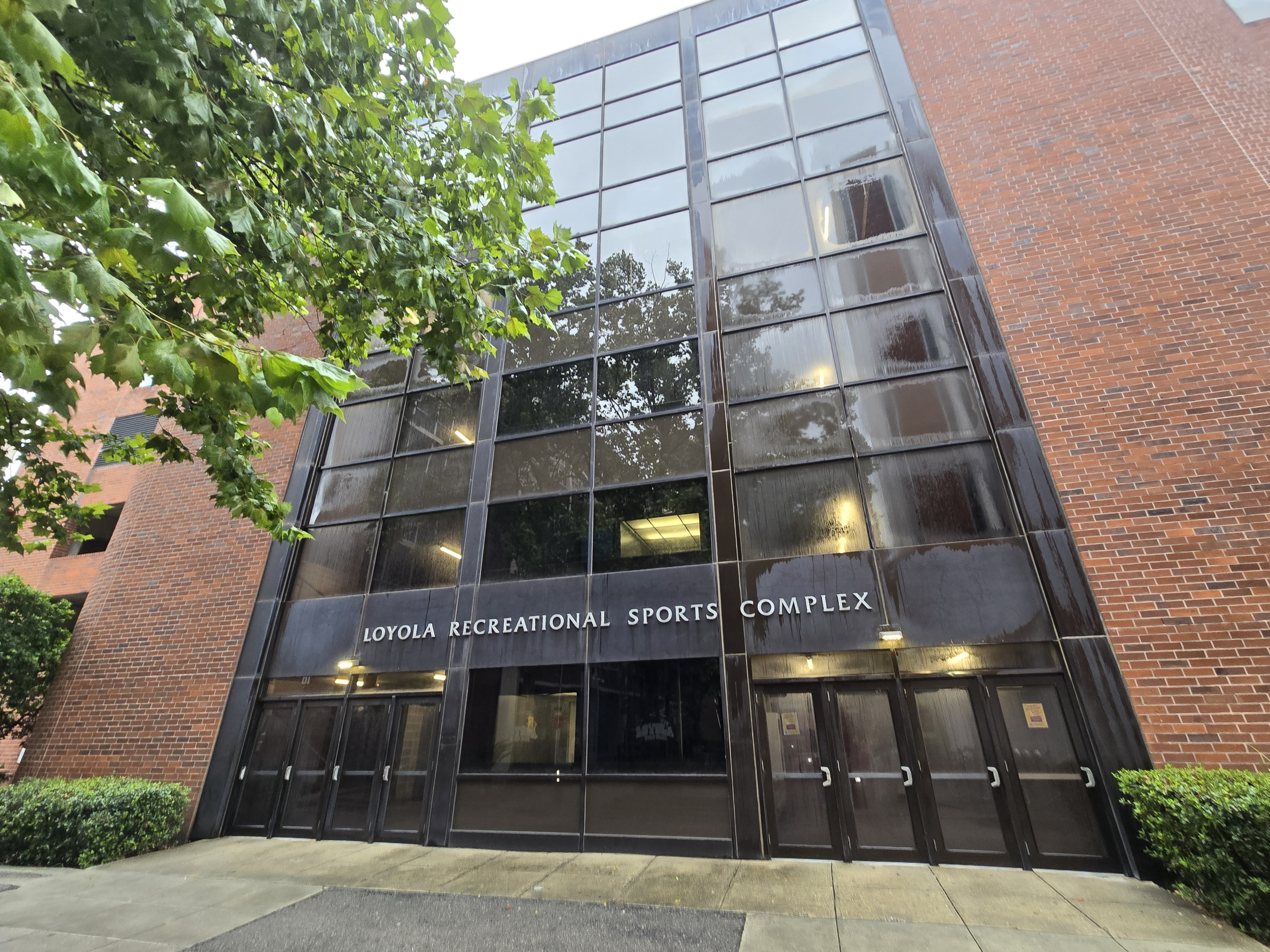
- Entrance to the complex
- Interactive map of University Sports Complex
- Location: New Orleans, LA
- Coordinates: 29°56′15.2″N 90°7′11.8″W
- Owner: Loyola University New Orleans
- Operator: Loyola University Athletics
- Capacity: 500
- Type: Arena
- Surface: Multi-surface
- Current use: Basketball; Volleyball; Swimming

Construction
- Opened: 1987; 39 years ago
- Renovated: 2017

Tenants
- Loyola Wolf Pack (NAIA) teams: basketball, volleyball, swimming

The University Sports Complex or The Den is a 500-seat multi-purpose arena in New Orleans, Louisiana, United States, on the campus of Loyola University New Orleans. It was formerly called the Recreational Sports Complex or Rec Plex.

== History ==
The facility opened in 1987 and was paid for with a donation from Freeport-McMoRan. The complex is located on the fifth and sixth floors of the Freret Street parking garage structure. It was built on the same site as the former Loyola Field House.

In 2017, the facility went through a major renovation, including new floor paint, new grandstands and more. The facility sustained major damage during Hurricane Ida in 2021 forcing the basketball teams to play across the street at Tulane University's Devlin Fieldhouse for portions of the 2021-2022 season.

== Athletic teams ==
It is home to the Loyola Wolf Pack basketball, swimming, and volleyball teams (men's/women's in all cases). The facility offers both men's and women's locker rooms for the teams. The facility also houses the offices for the Wolf Pack Athletics Department.

== Recreational sports ==
The University Sports Complex also serves as the student recreation center. The facility offers multi-purpose courts used for badminton, basketball, soccer, tennis and volleyball. It also has a racquetball court, a six-lane Olympic-style pool, a suspended track, a weightlifting/conditioning area, a whirlpool, sauna and steam room.

== Gallery ==
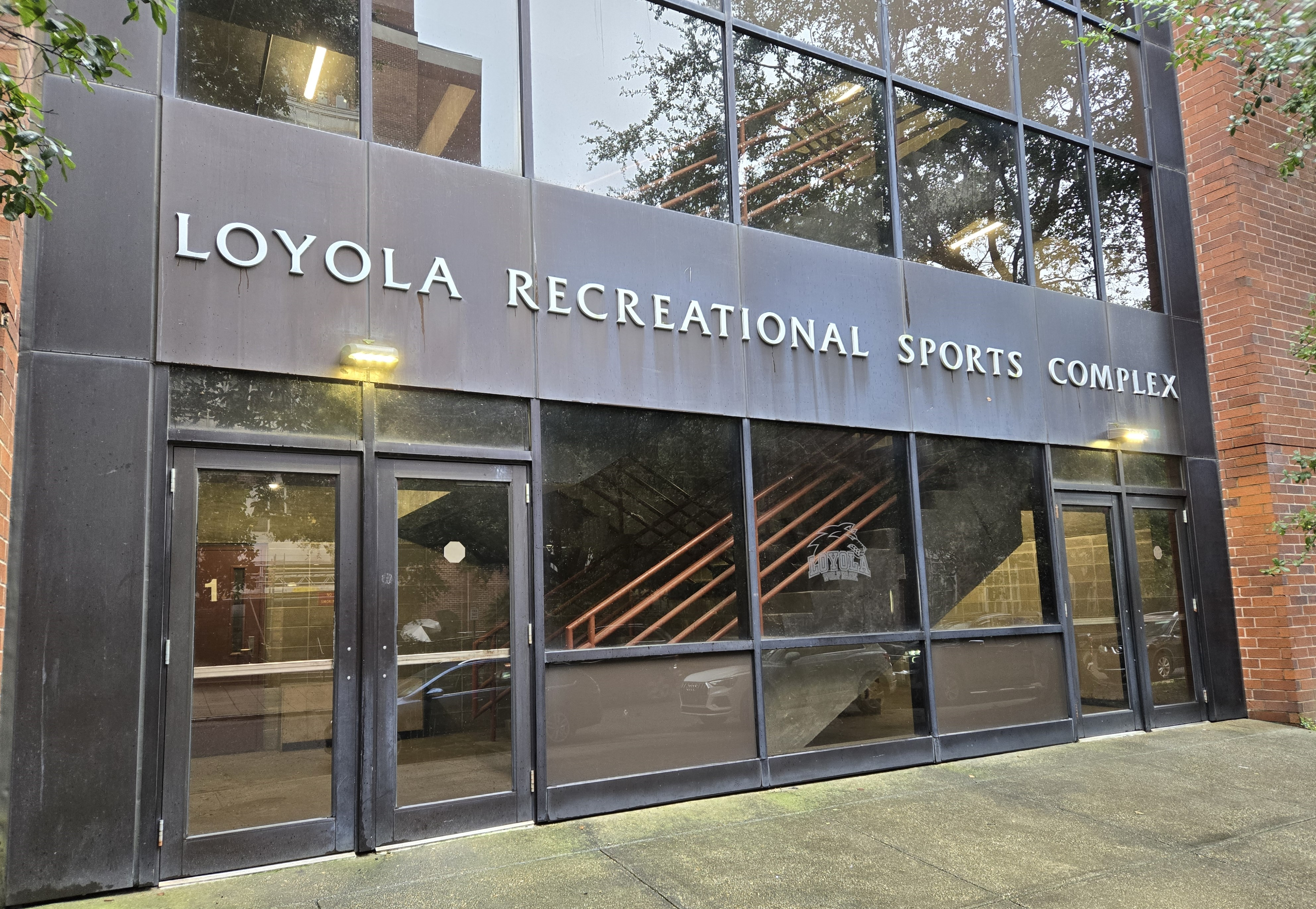

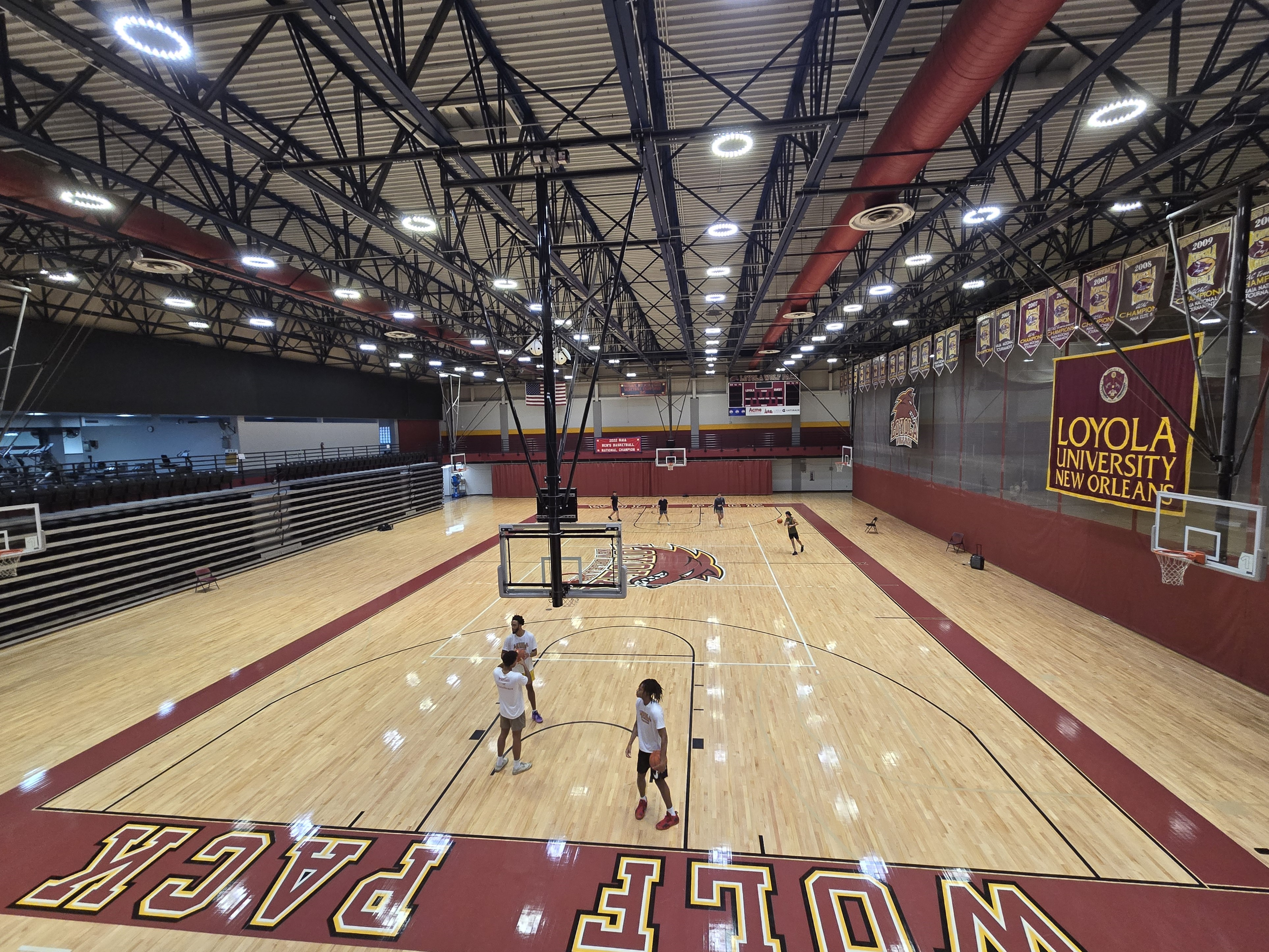

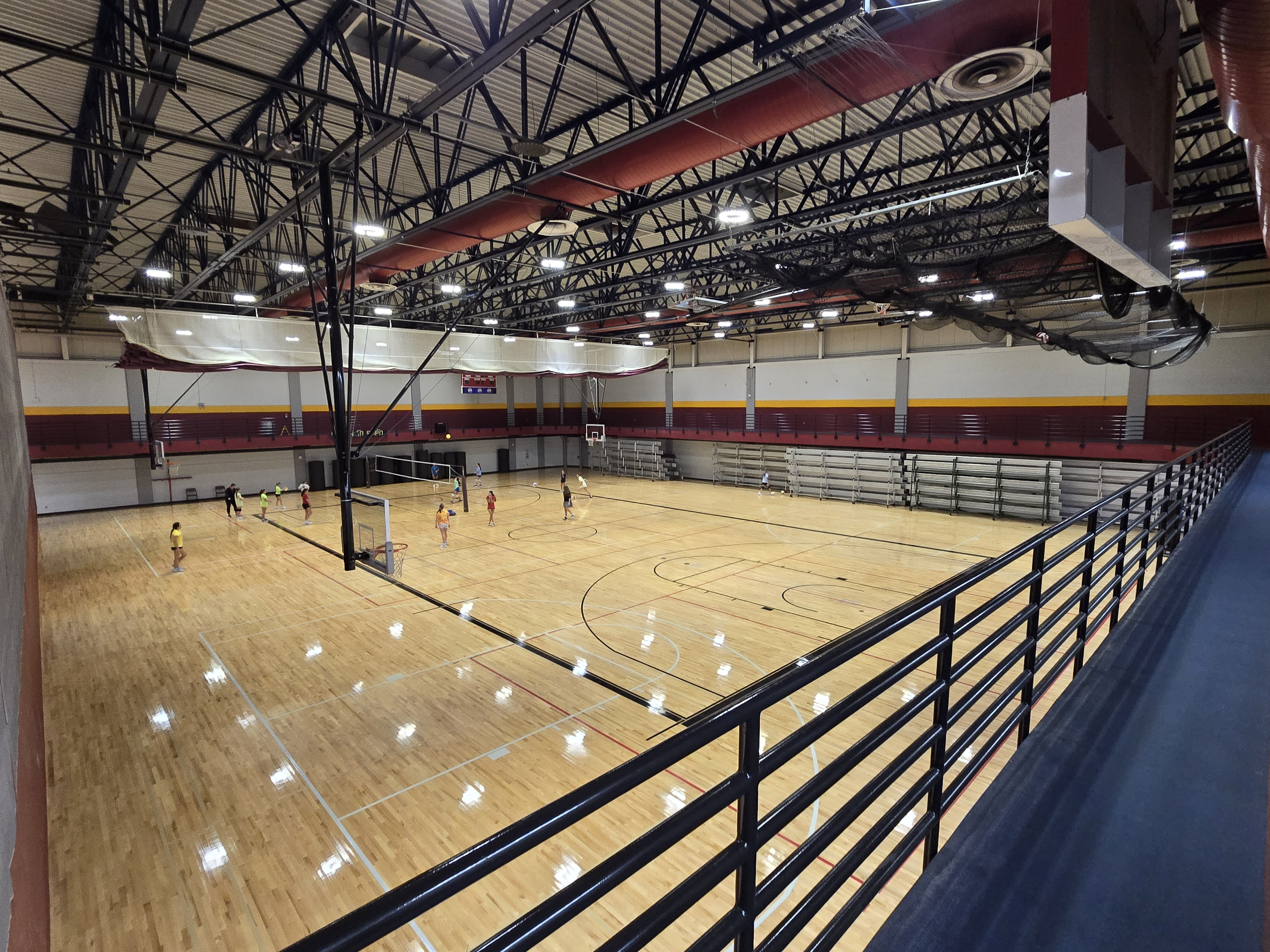

== See also ==
- Loyola Wolf Pack
- Loyola University New Orleans
