= Segnette Field =

Baseball stadium in Westwego, Louisiana

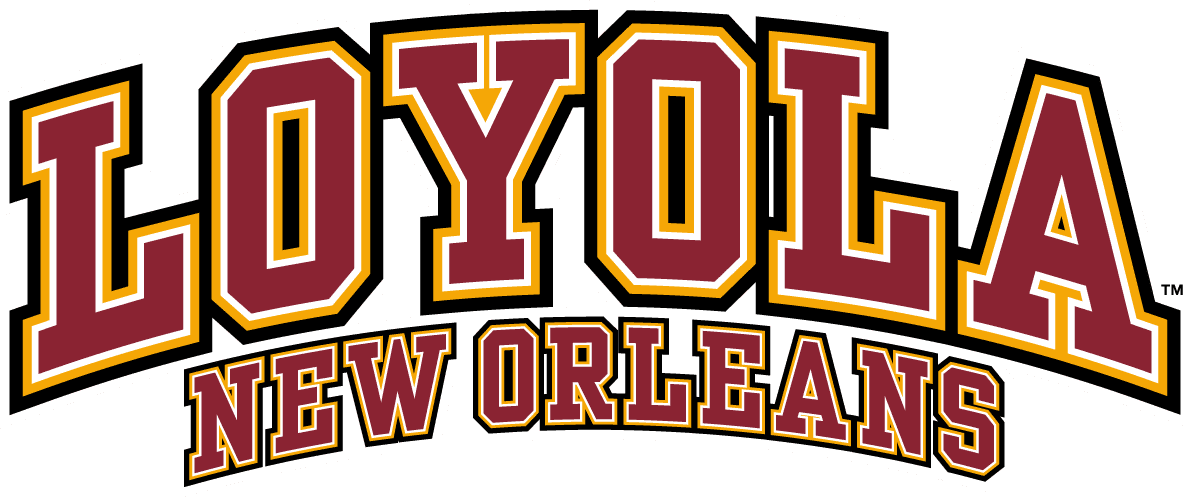

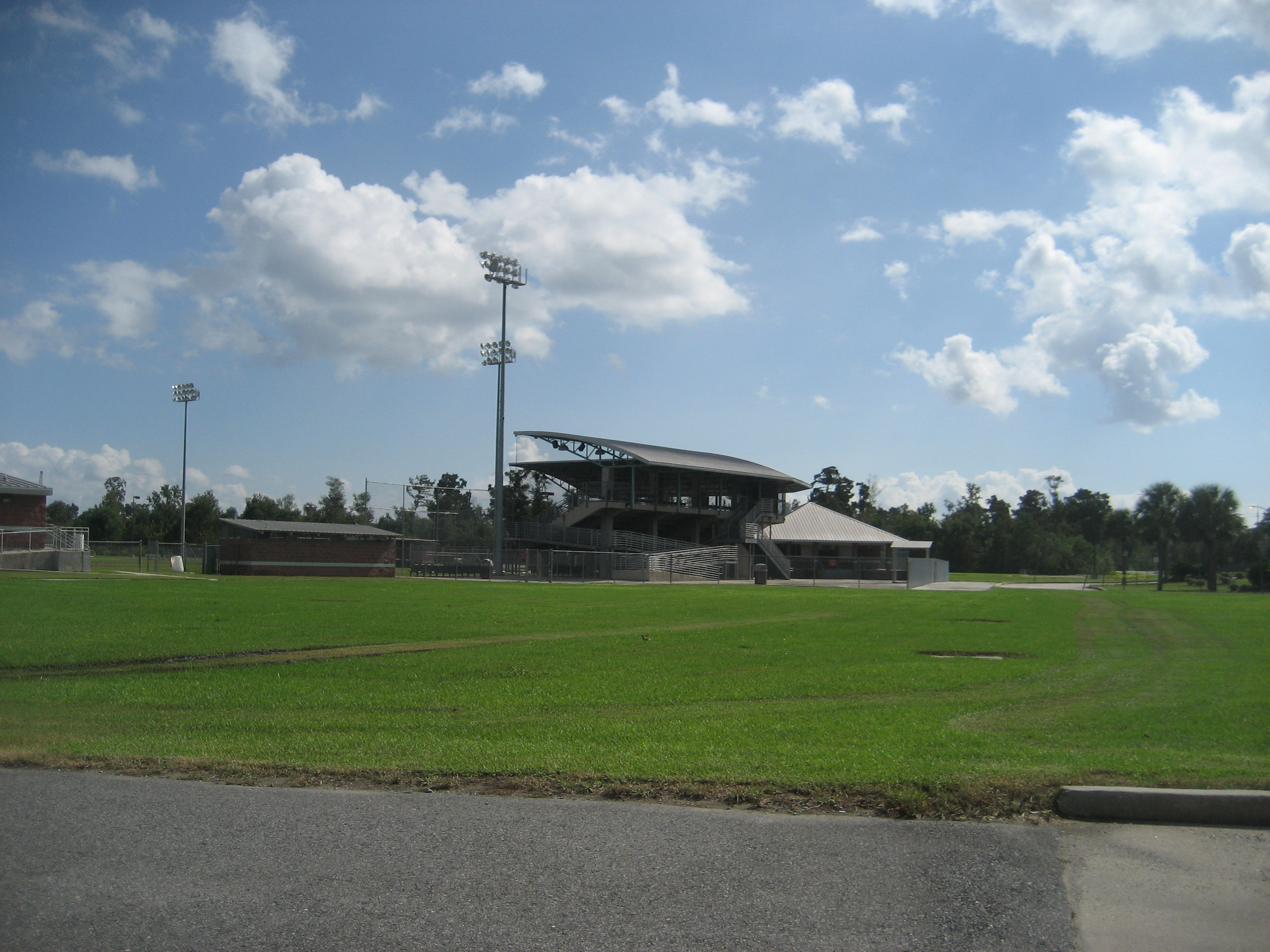
- Interactive map of Segnette Field
- Location: Segnette Blvd; Westwego, Louisiana
- Coordinates: 29.9035°N 90.1644°W
- Owner: Loyola University New Orleans
- Operator: Loyola University Athletics
- Capacity: 750
- Type: Ballpark
- Surface: Artificial Turf
- Field size: Left Field: 325 feet (99 m); Center Field: 400 feet (120 m); Right Field: 335 feet (102 m)
- Current use: Baseball

Construction
- Opened: 2002; 24 years ago

Tenants
- Loyola Wolfpack (baseball) (2003–present); LHSAA (baseball); American Legion (baseball)

Segnette Field is a 750-seat baseball stadium located in the New Orleans metropolitan area town of Westwego, Louisiana, United States. The stadium includes a grandstand, press box, public address system and scoreboard. The baseball field features artificial turf with a clay pitcher's mound. The stadium opened in May 2002.

It is the current home of the Loyola Wolf Pack baseball team. College baseball, LHSAA high school baseball games and American Legion baseball games are played at the stadium.

The stadium is also used for festivals.
