= Loyola Wolf Pack =

Athletics teams in New Orleans, US

- University: Loyola University New Orleans
- Nickname: Wolf Pack
- Association: NAIA
- Conference: Southern States (primary); Sun Conference (secondary); Gulf South (starting July 1, 2027)
- Athletic director: Brett Simpson
- Location: New Orleans, Louisiana
- Varsity teams: 20 (8 men's, 9 women's, 3 co-ed)
- Basketball arena: University Sports Complex
- Baseball stadium: Segnette Field
- Tennis venue: City Park Tennis Center
- Other venues: City Park Rugby Pitch; Money Hill Golf and Country Club; Tad Gormley Stadium; White Sands Volleyball Courts
- Colors: Maroon and gold
- Mascot: Havoc the Wolf
- Website: loyolawolfpack.com
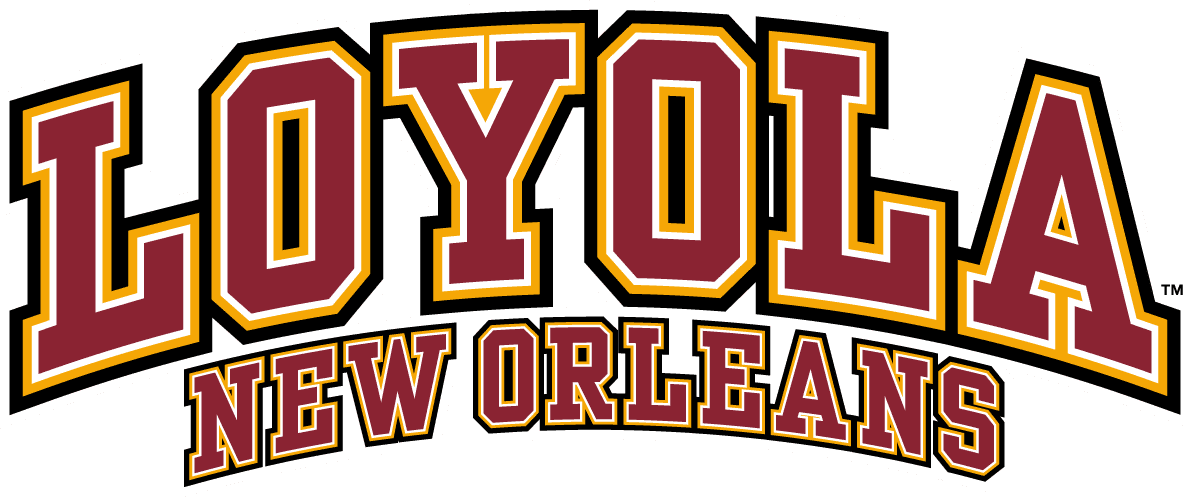

The Loyola Wolf Pack are the athletic teams representing Loyola University New Orleans in intercollegiate athletics. The Wolf Pack are a member of the National Association of Intercollegiate Athletics (NAIA), primarily competing in the Southern States Athletic Conference (SSAC) since the 2010–11 academic year. They previously competed in the Gulf Coast Athletic Conference (GCAC) from 1995–96 to 2009–10.

Loyola New Orleans will join the NCAA Division II Gulf South Conference (GSC) on July 1, 2027.

== History ==
The intercollegiate athletics program was discontinued in 1972, but was reinstated in 1991. Loyola's intercollegiate teams are almost wholly funded through student activity fees per a student referendum passed in 1991. In 1972, Loyola suspended its athletics program, citing "educational and financial" reasons.

However, in 1991, the athletics program was re-instituted, amid student appeals for its reinstatement, including the aforementioned referendum. Locally, Loyola's rivals are Xavier University of Louisiana and Dillard University. Loyola's old-school rival is a fellow Jesuit university Spring Hill College. The former Pack Pride Committee was founded in 2007 to promote athletics and to encourage community members to be "Proud to be Part of the 'Pack'".

== Sports sponsored ==
Loyola (La.) competes in 20 intercollegiate varsity sports:

Men's sports	Women's sports
Baseball	Basketball
Basketball	Beach Volleyball
Cross Country	Cross Country
Golf	Golf
Rugby	Rugby
Swimming	Swimming
Tennis	Tennis
Track and Field^{1}	Track and Field^{1}
	Volleyball
Co-ed sports
Competitive Cheer	Competitive Dance
Esports
^{1} – includes both indoor and outdoor.

=== Baseball ===
The baseball team represents Loyola University New Orleans. The school's team currently competes in the Southern States Athletic Conference, which is part of the National Association of Intercollegiate Athletics. The team plays home games at 750-seat Segnette Field. Led by head coach Jeremy Kennedy, the Loyola Wolf Pack competed in its first NAIA World Series in 2025, winning its first-ever world series game against the University of British Columbia.

Loyola has had five Major League Baseball draft selections since the draft began in 1965.

Year	Player	Round	Team
1965	John Stephens	54	Orioles
1966	Donald Genussa	28	Orioles
1966	Gerry Schoen	25	Senators
1970	Robert Caballero	20	Red Sox
2000	David Lindsey	29	Cardinals

=== Men's basketball ===
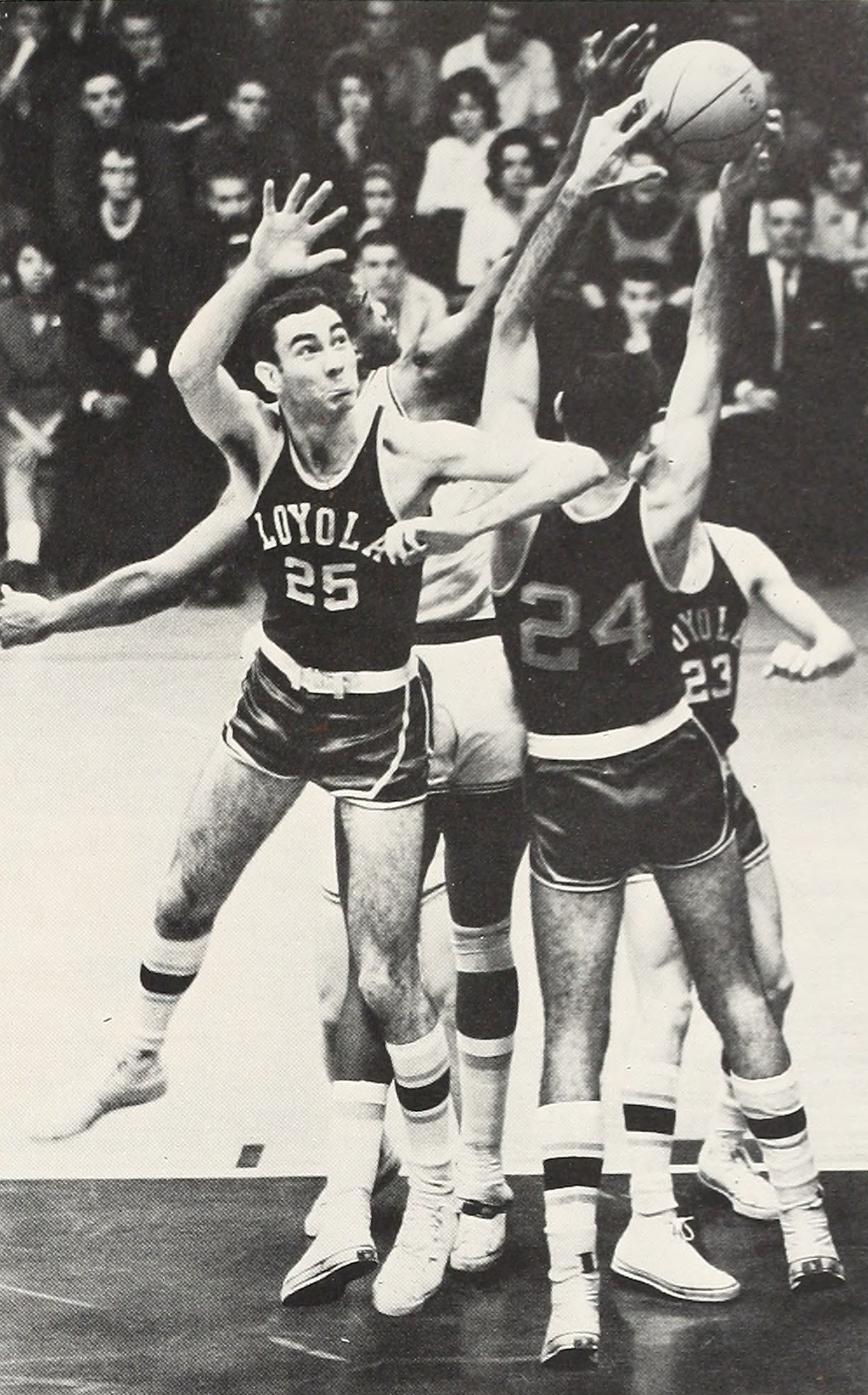
The Wolf Pack men's basketball team visiting Loyola-Chicago in 1963

The school's team currently competes in the Southern States Athletic Conference, which is part of the National Association of Intercollegiate Athletics. The team plays home games at the University Sports Complex.

The basketball team won the 1945 NAIA National Championship. They also made the 1946 NAIA National Semi-finals. The team made the NCAA Division I men's basketball tournament in 1954, 1957 and 1958, where they lost in the First Round each time. After 77 years, the team again won the NAIA National Championship in 2022. Loyola's championship coach, Stacy Hollowell is currently the head coach of the University of New Orleans Privateers basketball team. Myles Burns, who also won the championship with the Wolf Pack, competes in the NBA G-League.

=== Women's basketball ===
The school's team currently competes in the Southern States Athletic Conference, which is part of the National Association of Intercollegiate Athletics. The team plays home games at the University Sports Complex. Led by head coach Kellie Kennedy, the team has qualified for the NAIA National Tournament 12 consecutive seasons since 2013–14.

=== Men's and women's swimming ===
Loyola swimming teams currently compete in the Sun Conference of the NAIA. The teams formerly competed in the Mid-South Conference, which is also part of the National Association of Intercollegiate Athletics, and has been consistently ranked in the top-10 nationally since its inception in 2016. The team hosts home meets at the University Sports Complex.

=== Men's tennis ===
The men's tennis team represents Loyola University New Orleans. The school's team currently competes in the Southern States Athletic Conference, which is part of the National Association of Intercollegiate Athletics. The team plays home matches at the City Park/Pepsi Tennis Center.

=== Women's tennis ===
The women's tennis team represents Loyola University New Orleans. The school's team currently competes in the Southern States Athletic Conference, which is part of the National Association of Intercollegiate Athletics. The team plays home matches at the City Park/Pepsi Tennis Center.

=== Men's and women's track and field ===
The men's and women's track and field teams represent Loyola University New Orleans. The school's teams currently compete in the Southern States Athletic Conference, which is part of the National Association of Intercollegiate Athletics.

Loyola runner Emmett Toppino won a gold medal at the 1932 Summer Olympics as the second leg in the 4 x 100-meter relay in which a new world record was established.

=== Volleyball ===
The volleyball team represents Loyola University New Orleans. The school's team currently competes in the Southern States Athletic Conference, which is part of the National Association of Intercollegiate Athletics. The team plays home games at the University Sports Complex.

== Former varsity sports ==
=== Boxing ===
Loyola University New Orleans formerly sponsored a boxing team. Loyola boxer Eddie Flynn won the welterweight gold medal at the 1932 Summer Olympics.

=== Football ===
Loyola University New Orleans formerly sponsored a varsity football team starting in 1921. The team was disbanded after the 1939 season for financial reasons. The team played at Loyola University Stadium.

== Athletic facilities ==
Venue	Image	Sport(s)	Opened	Ref.
City Park Rugby Pitch		Rugby	n/a	
City Park Tennis Center		Tennis	2011	
Jefferson Playground		Cross Country	n/a	
Lake Oaks Park		Cross Country	n/a	
Money Hill Golf and Country Club		Golf	1998	
Parc des Familles		Cross Country	n/a	
Segnette Field		Baseball	2002	
Tad Gormley Stadium		Track and Field	1937	
University Sports Complex		Basketball; Volleyball; Swimming	1987	
White Sands Volleyball Courts		Beach Volleyball	2014	
Bayou Oaks At City Park (Note: Former venue.)		Golf	1902	
English Turn Golf and Country Club		Golf	1988	
Lafreniere Park		Cross Country	n/a	
Loyola University Stadium		Football; Track and Field	1928	
