= City Park/Pepsi Tennis Center =

Tennis facility in New Orleans, United States

City Park Tennis Center

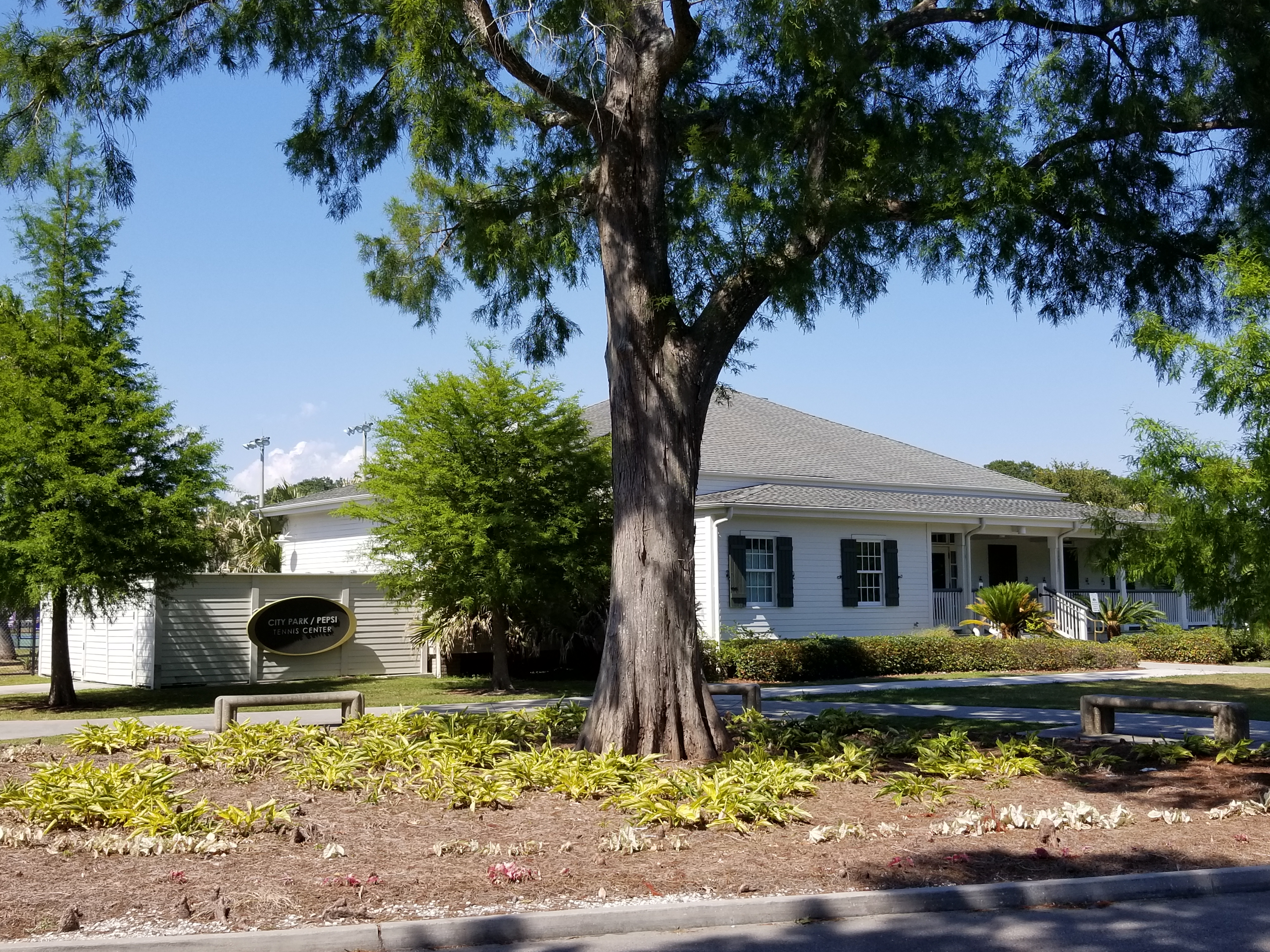
- Interactive map of City Park Tennis Center
- Address: New Orleans, Louisiana; United States
- Coordinates: 30°00′06″N 90°05′34″W
- Owner: New Orleans City Park
- Operator: New Orleans City Park
- Type: Tennis court
- Current use: Tennis

Construction
- Opened: 2011; 15 years ago
- Cost: 3.9 million USD

Tenants
- Loyola Wolf Pack (NCAA) tennis Tulane Green Wave (NCAA)

Website
- neworleanscitypark.org/tennis

The City Park Tennis Center is a tennis complex located in City Park in New Orleans, United States. The facility, built in 2011, serves as the home of the Loyola Wolf Pack and Tulane Green Wave tennis teams.

The facility offers 26 lighted tennis courts. It has 16 hard courts and 10 clay courts along with a practice court and a club house. The club house is 3,500 square feet and includes a meeting room, showers and lockers.

The tennis center hosts the City Park Grand Slam Tennis Tournament and has hosted the Allstate Sugar Bowl Tennis Tournament.

== History of City Park tennis facilities ==
In 1922, City Park had a tennis facility with 17 courts.

== Gallery ==
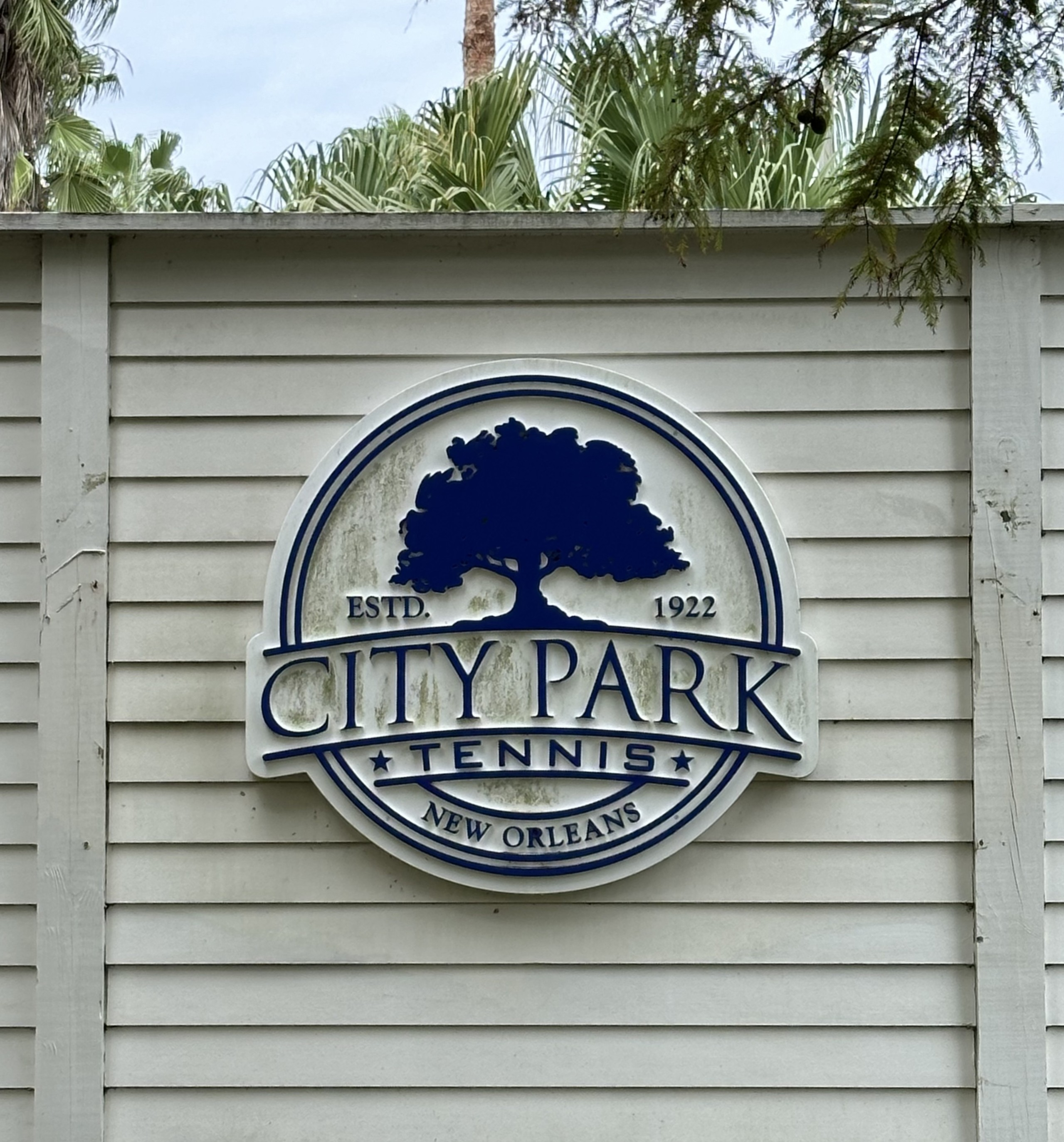
City Park Tennis Center

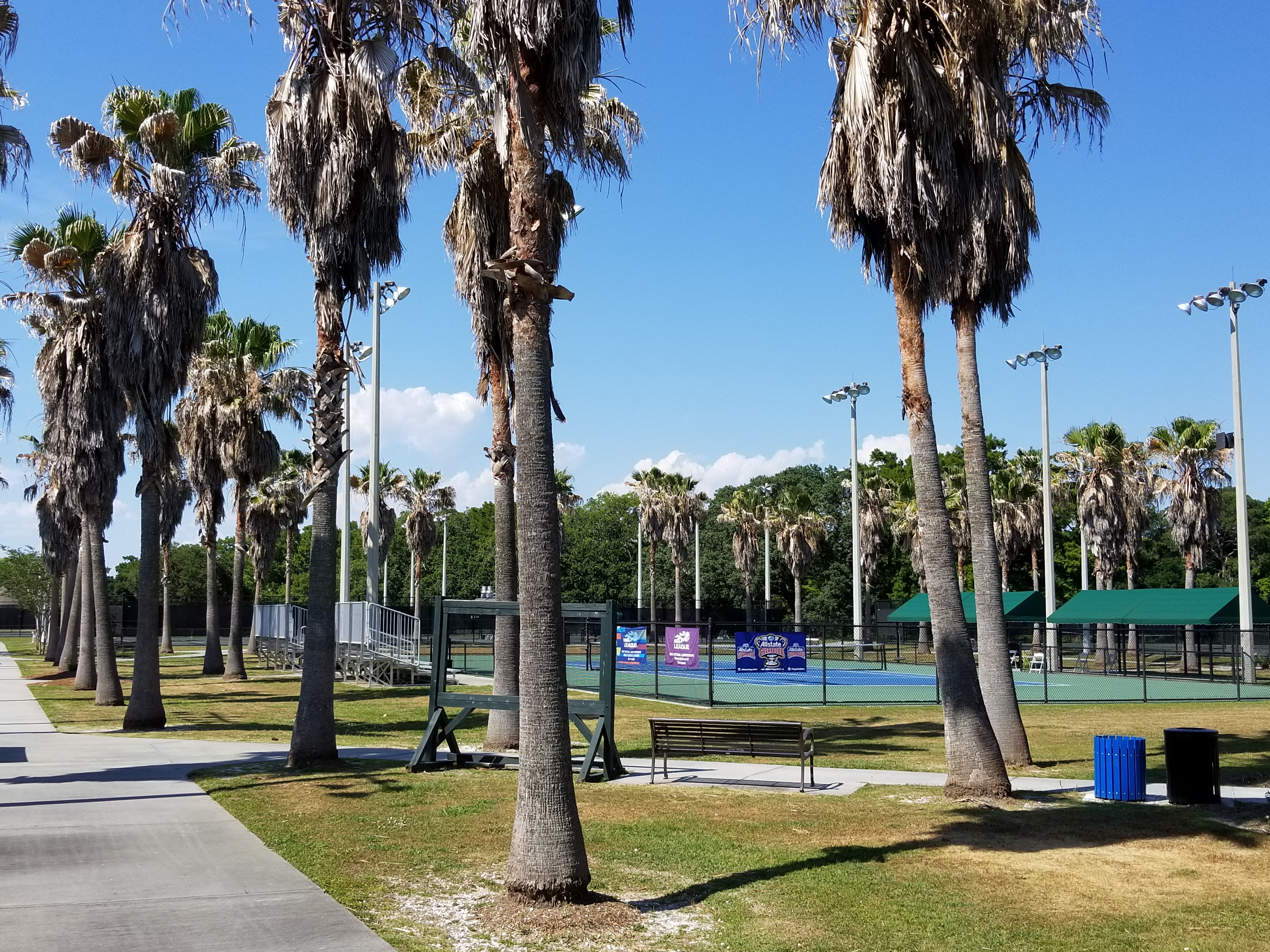
City Park Tennis Center main courts

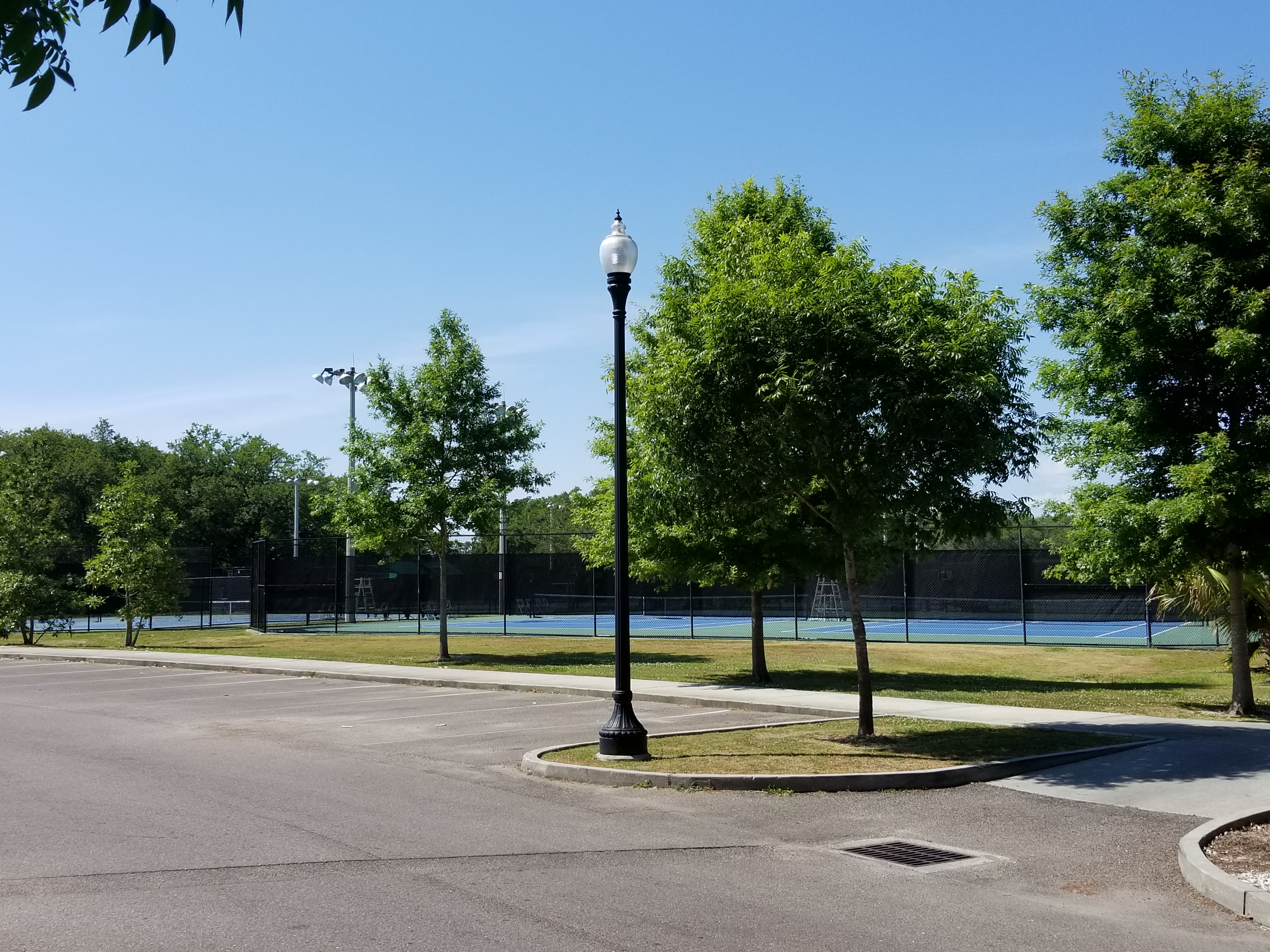
City Park Tennis Center courts

== See also ==
- City Park (New Orleans)
- Loyola Wolf Pack
- Tulane Green Wave
