= New Orleans Recreation Department =

City recreation agency

- NORD

Department overview
- Formed: 1946
- Superseding department: New Orleans Playgrounds Commission
- Jurisdiction: New Orleans, Louisiana
- Headquarters: 5420 Franklin Avenue New Orleans, Louisiana 70122 United States; 30.0146°N 90.0520°W
- Motto: Something for everyone
- Employees: 131 full-time 117 part-time (2019)
- Annual budget: 14.6 million USD (2019)
- Department executives: Larry Barabino, Jr., CEO; Brian P. Egana, Chairman of the NORD Commission
- Parent department: Office of Youth and Families
- Website: nordc.org

The New Orleans Recreation Department is the department of the local government of the city of New Orleans, Louisiana USA, that operates and maintains recreational facilities for the people of the city. It is commonly known by the acronym NORD.

Formed in 1946, NORD was among the first of its kind in the United States. It won accolades early in its history, being considered progressive by the standards of the mid-twentieth century.

As of 2010, the New Orleans Recreation Department Commission provides administrative oversight for NORD. In 2017, NORD was accredited by the National Recreation and Park Association. Although its activities emphasize sports, they are not limited to sports and include activities such as music, theater and dance.

== History ==
=== Founding ===
The New Orleans City Council created NORD with City Ordinance No. 16,630 on September 27, 1946, going into effect on January 1, 1947. Mayor deLesseps S. Morrison had started to press for its creation from his time campaigning for mayor while still a member of the Louisiana State Legislature. Morrison maintained his interest in the organization through his term of office. By 1949, the juvenile delinquency rate in New Orleans declined by 50%, with NORD receiving some credit for the change.

The immediate forerunner of NORD was the New Orleans Juvenile Sports Association which was established during World War II. This association did not manage recreational activities and facilities in a comprehensive way, and administration was inefficiently divided among approximately 16 different government agencies.

Morrison's interest in creating NORD began with a pitch by Lester Lautenschlaeger, John Brechtel, G. Gernon Brown, and Morris Jeff. Lautenschlaeger was a noted local athlete and civic leader. Brechtel was an administrator for the New Orleans Juvenile Sports Association. Brown was a prominent local high school football coach; and Jeff was the athletic director at Xavier University of New Orleans, an historically black university. This pitch presentation occurred while Morrison was engaged in his political campaign to become mayor of New Orleans.

With Mayor Morrison's sponsorship, the city of New Orleans appropriated $300,000 to create NORD, which was a large sum of money for the time. Morrison appointed Lautenschlaeger as NORD's first director, with Brechtel as assistant director. Lautenschlaeger voluntarily served as director for a salary of $1 per year. Henry Beter served as athletic director for NORD from its inception. Lautenschlaeger, Brechtel, and Beter all had long tenures with NORD and provided forceful administration of the organization.

Within 16 months of its inception, NORD constructed 58 new playgrounds and 8 new swimming pools. NORD made use of existing facilities to the extent possible, and so, with the new constructions, had 91 playgrounds, 17 swimming pools, and 8 sports stadiums. At that time, it sponsored 25 baseball leagues. Nearly from the start, its programs included classes and workshops for theater, dance, arts & crafts, and youth day camps. NORD has also provided programs for senior citizens since its earliest days.

Under Morrison's city leadership, the city government funded NORD from the city's general funds, while Lautenschlaeger supplemented funding by soliciting private donations.

=== Olive A. Stallings ===
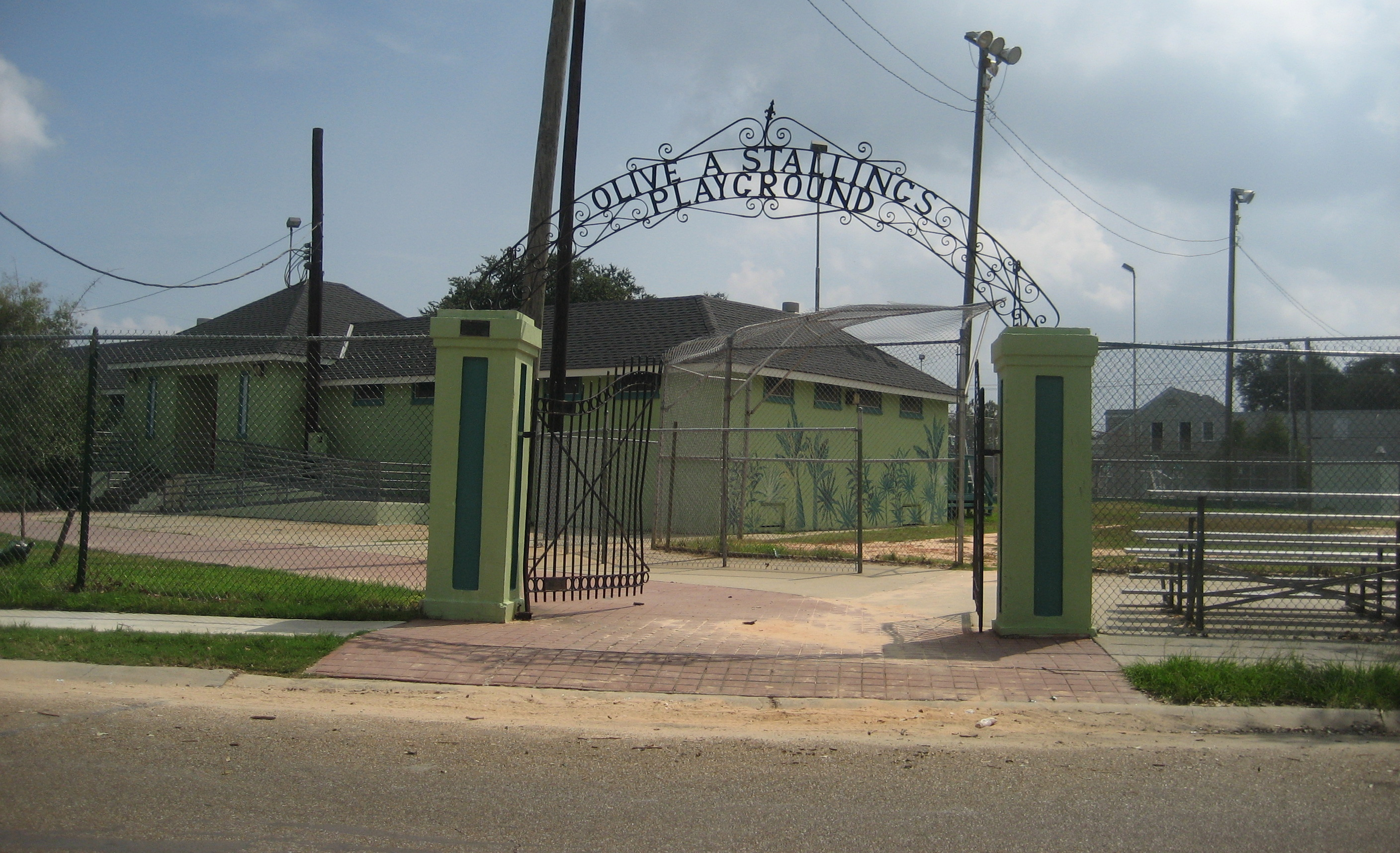
Entrance to Olive Stallings Playground in Gentilly (photo courtesy of Infrogmation)

Public recreation facilities in New Orleans can be traced to the work of civic leader Olive A. Stallings (1866–1940). Following her attendance at a 1906 meeting of the National Recreation Association in Pittsburgh, Pennsylvania USA, Stallings became interested in providing publicly available recreation facilities in her hometown of New Orleans. In 1906, Stallings funded and established the Poydras Playground which was the first play center in New Orleans.

Stallings served on the New Orleans Playground Commission from 1911 to 1940 and was the commission's first president. She was the founder and first president of the New Orleans Outdoor Art and Improvement Association which was the forerunner of the New Orleans Parkway Commission. Stallings served on the zoning board of the city and was the founder of the first Girl Scouts organization in the New Orleans. By 1938, aided by Stallings's efforts, New Orleans had 18 playgrounds and 6 swimming pools for purposes of general recreation.

In 1929, the New Orleans Times-Picayune newspaper presented Stallings with its Loving Cup Award for her efforts on civic improvement, especially children's recreation. NORD has a Stallings Playground, eponymous to her.

=== Segregation in NORD ===
The 1947 creation of NORD coincided with the Jim Crow era of the southern United States. For this reason, NORD facilities were racially segregated through its early history. Shortly after inception, NORD provided 19 facilities for the black community and more than 100 for the white community. At that time, the demographics of New Orleans were about 32% African-American, and so NORD was disproportionately supporting the white people of the city.

In 1947, at the time that the city of New Orleans created NORD, Mayor Morrison established an advisory commission of African American community leaders as part of NORD's organization. In 1948, NORD opened Shakespeare Park and Julius Rosenwald Center specifically for African-Americans as segregated operations.

During the period of segregation, NORD maintained a "negro division". While NORD disproportionately supported the white population, NORD provided facilities for the African-American population when previously they had none. An example of such a facility was Lincoln Beach.

NORD remained racially segregated until after the 1963 Barthe v. City of New Orleans court decision. In 1964, the United States Supreme Court upheld the decision, initiating the desegregation of NORD. Lester Lautenschlaeger was still serving as NORD's director at the time of the Supreme Court decision, and he refused to comply with the court's decision. Then mayor Moon Landrieu removed Lautenschlaeger from the post, thereby clearing the way for racial integration of NORD's programs and facilities.

=== Period of decline ===
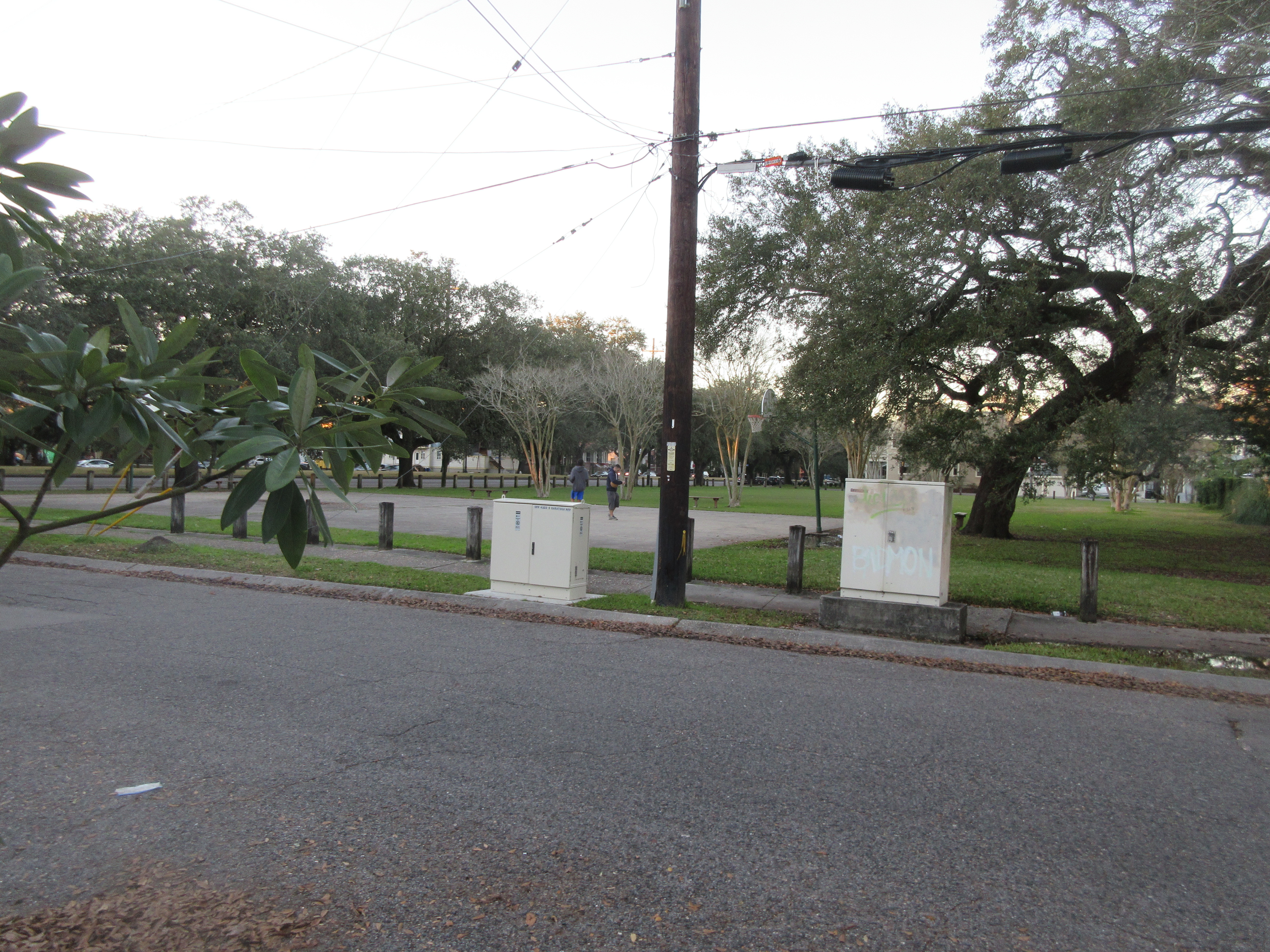
Samuel Square, a NORD facility that was racially integrated soon after court order

City leaders in New Orleans reacted to the requirement by the courts to integrate NORD facilities by closing swimming pools and other NORD facilities. Public funding for NORD also diminished. These events led to the subsequent decline of the quality and quantity of NORD's programs and facilities.

Voters in New Orleans rejected a proposal to incorporate Palmer Park in the Carrollton section of New Orleans into NORD, which would have resulted in racial integration of this all-white park. Opponents of the proposal claimed that racial integration of the park would result in declining property values in the neighborhood and accelerate the departure of white people to the suburbs. The opponents of the proposal pointed to the integration of the Samuel Square park as a "public disgrace", claiming the same would happen to Palmer Park should it become part of NORD. Although this proposal to New Orleans voters failed, Palmer Park subsequently became part of the city's park system in 1977, resulting in decisive racial integration.

Members of the black community in New Orleans responded by forming the Target Areas Recreation Committee (TARC), which was established to call attention to the inadequate focus on black children in the city.

=== Impact of Hurricane Katrina ===
NORD was already in a state of decline by the time of Hurricane Katrina in 2005. Many of NORD's facilities were seriously damaged by the hurricane, remaining in a state of significant disrepair and neglect at least until 2010 when reform movements began.

At the time of a 2010 survey of NORD facilities, five years after Hurricane Katrina, seven of NORD's sixteen swimming pools were open, with many of its community centers closed or destroyed. The survey showed that the NORD facilities in the more affluent sections of New Orleans received preferential treatment. NORD facilities on the west bank of the city were undamaged in comparison to those on the east bank. Reconstruction of the NORD facilities after the hurricane was slow. Some New Orleans residents attempted reconstruction with private funds, although city government had not cooperated as of 2010.

=== Revitalization ===
Revitalization of NORD began in earnest when Mitch Landrieu became mayor of New Orleans in 2010. In his first State of the City speech, on July 8, 2010, Landrieu stated: "... when I came into office 67 days ago, I found a recreation department that would make you weep, one that is underfunded and under-prioritized. We found many of NORD's facilities are in shambles — swimming pools without filtration systems, no restrooms and no shower facilities."

As part of his efforts to reform NORD, Landrieu established the NORD Commission in 2010, to serve as a governing body for NORD. At nearly the same time, Landrieu created the NORD Foundation, which is a 501(c)(3) nonprofit organization charged with supplementing the finances of NORD.

== Governance and organization ==
NORD states its mission as being "to advance the physical, mental, and social well-being of New Orleanians by providing safe and welcoming environments for recreational, athletic, and cultural experiences."

Day-to-day operations of NORD are the responsibility of its chief executive officer. NORD is directed by the NORD Commission, which is a group of community leaders appointed by the mayor of New Orleans and who serve on the commission without compensation. City funding of NORD is supplemented by the NORD Foundation, and, in this way, NORD operates as a public-private partnership. The government of the State of Louisiana has funded some NORD projects. The Federal Emergency Management Agency has provided public funding for some projects that were part of NORD's recovery from Hurricane Katrina.

Improvements to NORD's Joe W. Brown Park were completed as a result of a public-private partnership between the city of New Orleans, the AllState Sugar Bowl, the Nike Corporation, and the Brees Dream Foundation.

== Programs and facilities ==
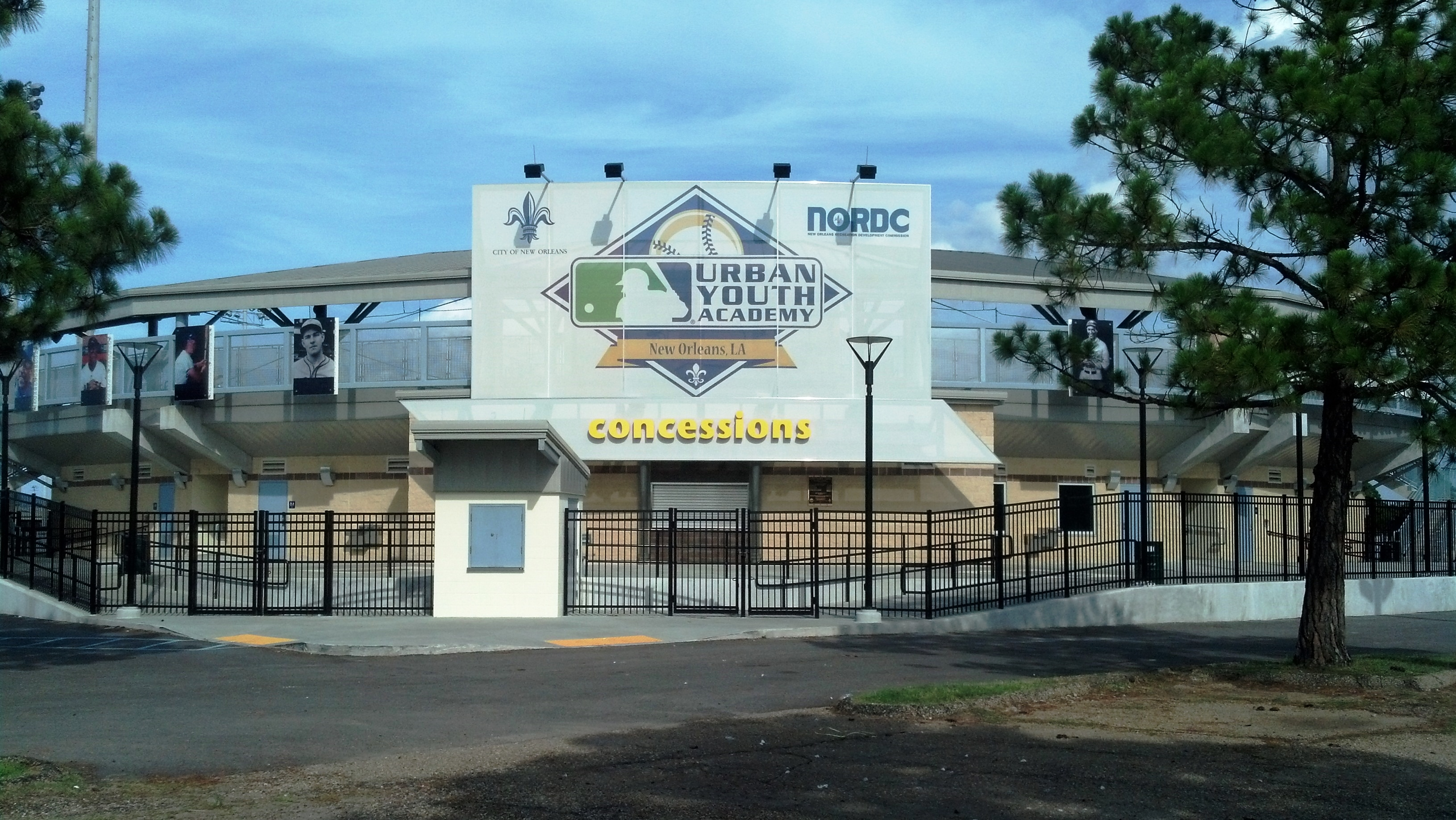
Wesley Barrow Stadium. Its sign shows the NORD logo.

Although NORD emphasizes programs for children, it provides programs for people of all ages. As of 2017, NORD operated 15 swimming pools and 12 community centers. In addition to sports, NORD provides music instruction, exercise programs, youth summer camps, art classes, programs for professional development, and homework help for school-age children.

Programs include ones for people with special needs. NORD has programs specifically designed to encourage participation of girls and young women in sports.

Representative NORD facilities include, among others:

- Joe W. Brown Park, including Victory Field
- A.L. Davis Park (formerly known as Shakespeare Park)
- Rosenwald Recreation Center
- Sanchez Multi-Service Center
- Stallings Playground
- Wesley Barrow Stadium

== Recognition ==
A 1949 article by Life Magazine reported that Associate Supreme Court Justice Tom C. Clark referred to NORD as the most progressive municipal recreation program in the United States.

In 1967, NORD was named Outstanding Organization by the Allstate Sugar Bowl.

With its 2017 accreditation by the National Recreation and Park Association, NORD became part of just 1% of all the recreation departments in the United States which have earned this distinction.

== Notable NORD participants ==
- Nehemiah Atkinson, tennis teacher and facilities manager
- Wesley Barrow, baseball player and coach
- Marshall Faulk, professional football player
- Givonna Joseph, opera singer
- Moon Landrieu, baseball pitcher, later a politician
- Branford Marsalis, musician
- Greer Goff Mendy, dancer, later a lawyer
- Rusty Staub, professional baseball player
- Linda Tuero, professional tennis player

== Gallery ==
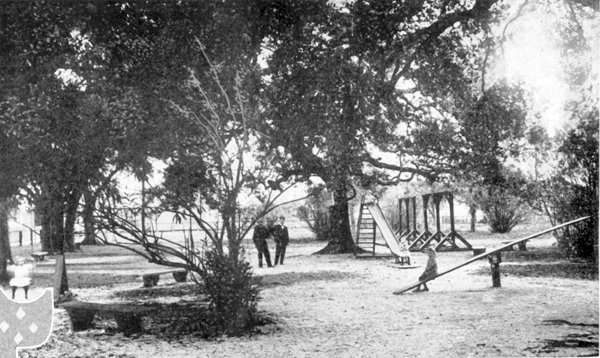
Milneburg Playground in 1912, later a part of NORD

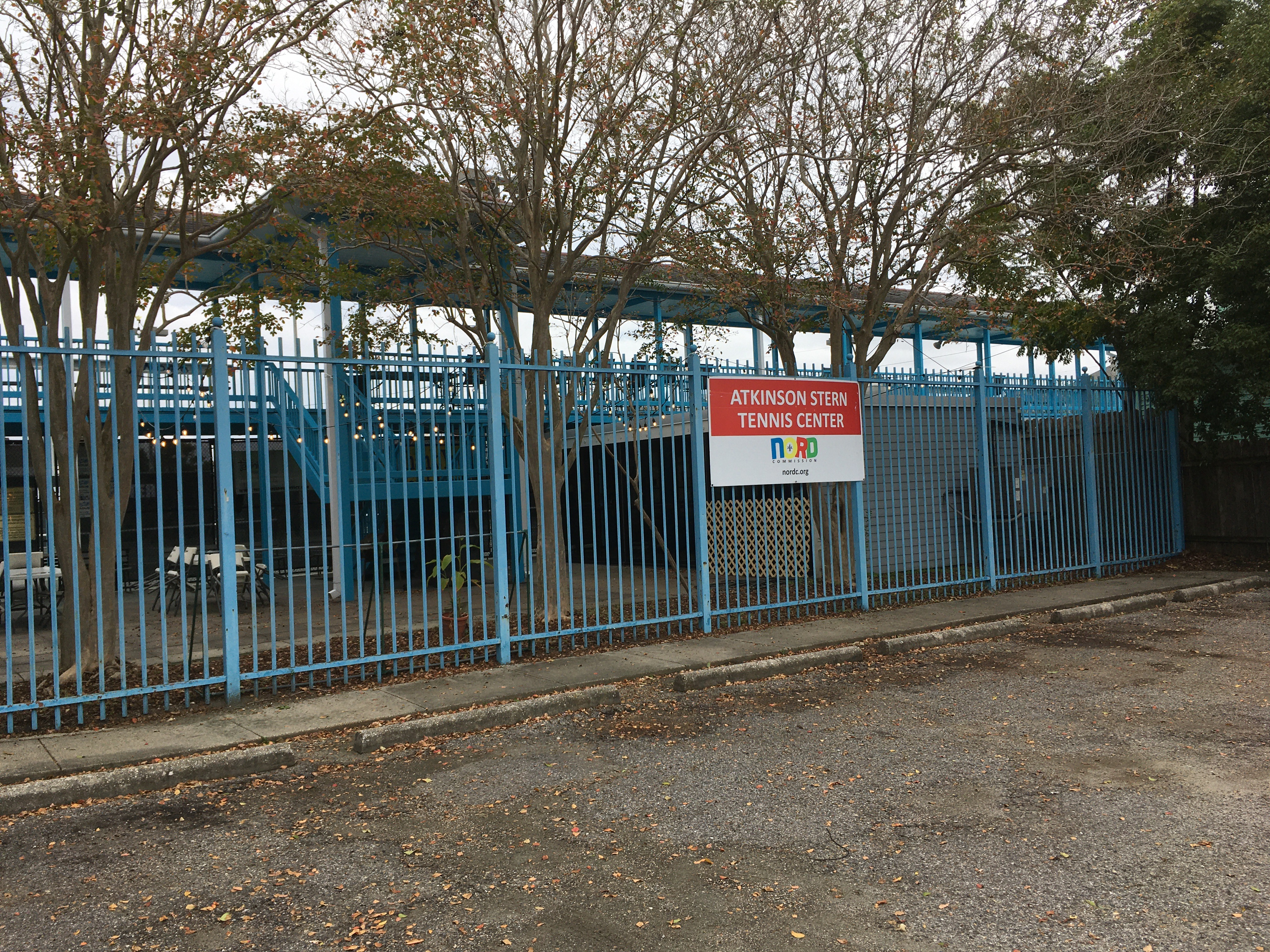
Atkinson - Stern Tennis Center, a NORD facility

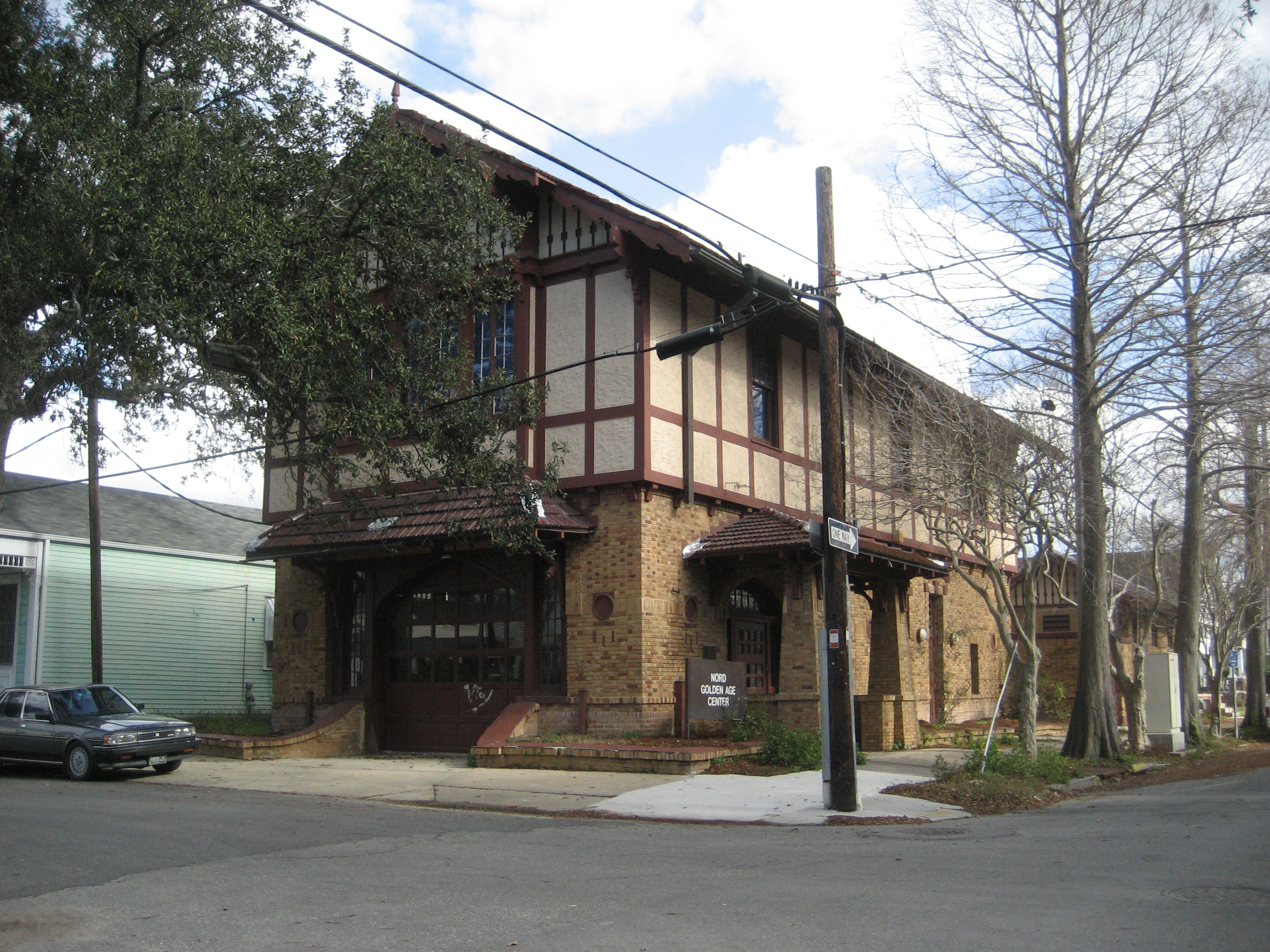
Mid-City Fire House that was converted into a NORD community center in the mid-1970s
