= New Orleans Jazz & Heritage Festival =

Annual music festival

- Genre: Jazz
- Dates: April/May
- Locations: New Orleans, Louisiana, U.S.
- Coordinates: 29.95°N 90.08°W
- Years active: 1970–2019, 2022–
- Founders: George Wein
- Website: nojazzfest.com

The New Orleans Jazz & Heritage Festival (commonly called Jazz Fest or Jazzfest) is an annual celebration of local music and culture held at the Fair Grounds Race Course in New Orleans, Louisiana. Jazz Fest attracts thousands of visitors to New Orleans each year. The New Orleans Jazz & Heritage Festival and Foundation Inc., as it is officially named, was established in 1970 as a 501(c)(3) nonprofit organization (NPO). The Foundation is the original organizer of the New Orleans Jazz & Heritage Festival presented by Shell Oil Company, a corporate financial sponsor. The Foundation was established primarily to redistribute the funds generated by Jazz Fest into the local community. As an NPO, its mission further states that the Foundation "promotes, preserves, perpetuates and encourages the music, culture and heritage of communities in Louisiana through festivals, programs and other cultural, educational, civic and economic activities". The founders of the organization included pianist and promoter George Wein, producer Quint Davis and the late Allison Miner.

In addition to the Festival, the organization's other assets include radio station WWOZ 90.7 FM, the Jazz & Heritage Foundation Archive and The George & Joyce Wein Jazz & Heritage Center. The Foundation also raises funds by holding the Jazz & Heritage Gala every year and provides several educational programs and a variety of more targeted festivals.

Because of concerns over the COVID-19 pandemic, 2020 marked the first year in the fifty-year history of Jazz Fest that the two-week festival has been cancelled. It was originally rescheduled to take place October 8–17, 2021, but later cancelled completely. 2022 saw its resumption after a two-year hiatus.

== Background ==
In 1962, Olaf Lambert, the manager of the Royal Orleans Hotel in the French Quarter contacted George Wein, a jazz mogul and founder of the Newport Jazz Festival and the Newport Folk Festival in Rhode Island and asked him to bring his festival model to New Orleans. Wein met with Mayor Victor H. Schiro, Seymour Weiss a hotel executive and civic leader, and a few members of the New Orleans Chamber of Commerce to discuss the proposition. They decided that New Orleans and the South were not ready for a jazz festival. It was a time in the city's history that was fraught with racism and segregationists reminiscent of the Jim Crow era. City ordinances were still in place that prohibited interaction between black and white musicians, tourists and locals and prevented revitalization of the economy in this manner.

Two years after their initial meeting, Lambert again contacted George Wein and asked him to plan what was to be called the New Orleans International Jazz Festival for the spring of 1965. Racial tensions were on the rise, and the non-profit community effort was postponed because of "integration tensions". In the meantime, the proposed Annual New Orleans International Jazz Festival moved ahead under the auspices of attorney Dean A. Andrews Jr. Community organizations such as the New Orleans Jazz Club were not invited, and the event failed to attract big names, which Andrews claimed was by design. "Our idea is not to bring in big-time musicians. We want to tell the story of the New Orleans sound, to show the evolution of New Orleans jazz."

In 1967, Durel Black, a local businessman and president of the New Orleans Jazz Club, convinced the local Chamber of Commerce that it was time to make another attempt at starting a jazz festival in New Orleans. The city would celebrate its 250th anniversary in 1968, and Black recognized it as an opportunity to promote the festival. Wein was asked again to develop the festival; however, when it was discovered that his wife Joyce was African-American, the offer was retracted, and events director Tommy Walker was hired instead. A jazz festival was planned, and evening concerts were held in 1968 under the billing The International Jazzfest with headliners that included Louis Armstrong, Duke Ellington and a variety of other artists.

In 1969, a second International Jazzfest took place, resulting in a negative return on investment, despite its big name lineup. Durel Black contacted Wein yet again, assured him that his interracial marriage was no longer an issue, and asked him to take charge of the festival. Wein agreed and was prepared and motivated to protect the culture and heritage in Louisiana. However, he also recognized the barriers that prevented the International JazzFest of '69 from flourishing. He concluded that the format of the festival had to be changed from the ground up, and that local collaboration was necessary for it to succeed. He contacted Allan Jaffe, director of Preservation Hall, who arranged the necessary connections with Allison Miner, Quint Davis and several other promoters.

== Foundation history and founding ==
The New Orleans Jazz & Heritage Festival was established in 1970 under the guidance and vision of George Wein. The Festival achieved instant artistic success, despite its initial attendance of only 350 people. Wein's vision was straightforward: he wanted a large daytime fair with multiple stages featuring a diverse range of locally produced music styles, Louisiana cuisine food booths, and arts and crafts booths, as well as an evening concert series that would appeal to everyone. Wein also sought to develop a new perspective that would add a level of excitement to the festival presentation, and appeal to both The Crescent City culture and those who simply wanted to learn more about the city's unique way of life. In addition to local customs, he emphasized African, Caribbean, and French culture, and was able to present the music, cuisine and crafts of various cultures to the world through Jazz Fest in a way that was enjoyable and exciting.

"This festival could only take place in New Orleans, because here and only here is America's richest musical heritage." ~George Wein

The first Jazz Fest took place in 1970 outside the French Quarter in a park "that was once the site of Congo Square – the space where, during the 18th century, enslaved people gathered to trade, dance, and play music from their countries of origin." In 1972, after relocating to the infield of the Fair Grounds Race Course, Jazz Fest expanded by utilizing the entire 145-acre (59 ha) site. By 1975, the inaugural year of the Festival's limited-edition, silkscreen poster series, attendance was expected to reach 80,000. From 1976 to 1978, Jazz Fest expanded to two full weekends in conjunction with the Heritage Fair, and in 1979, the Festival expanded to three weekends to celebrate its tenth anniversary.

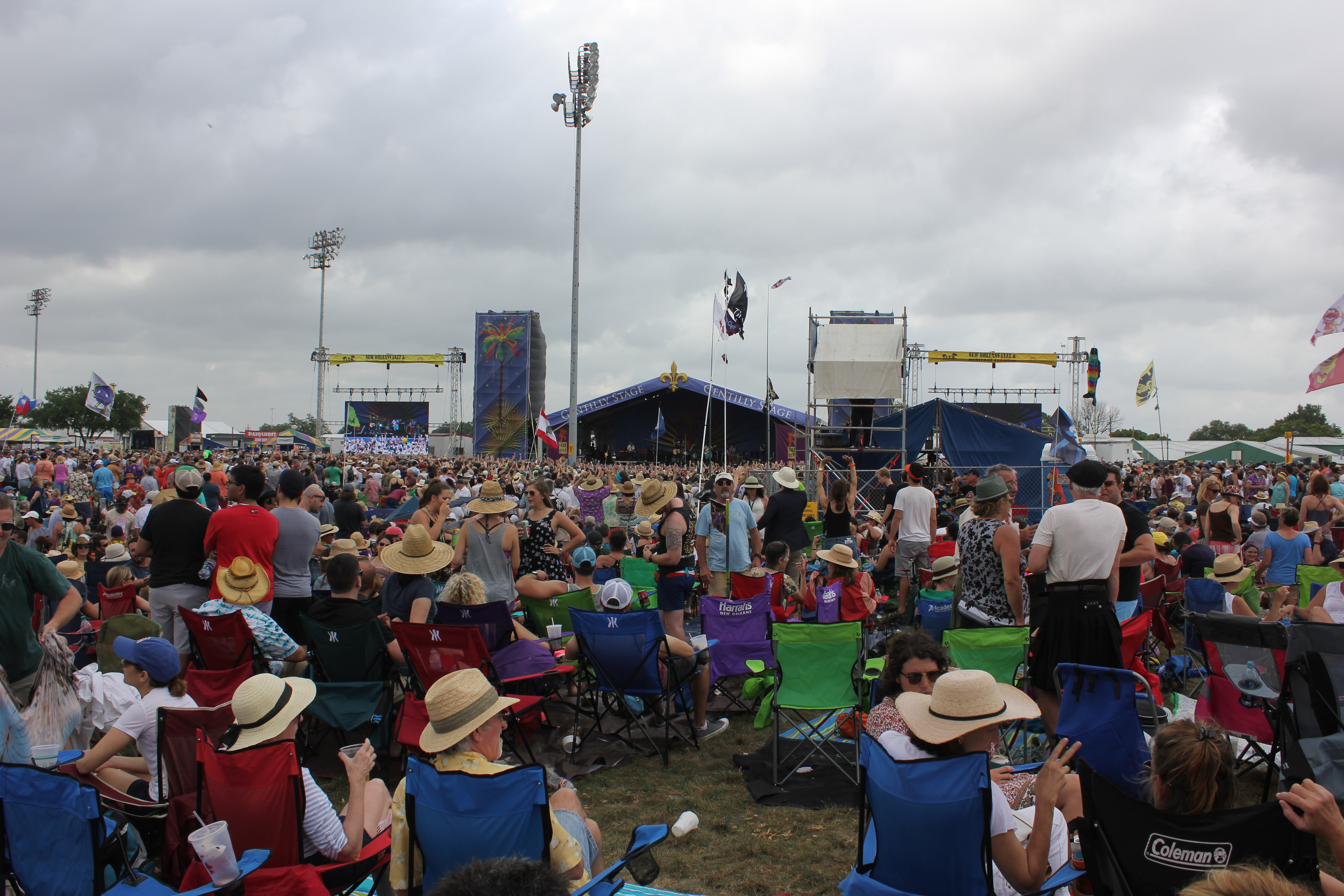
Crowds at the New Orleans Jazz & Heritage Festival.

By the early 1980s, the Festival continued growing in popularity, earning widespread recognition as one of the world's cultural celebrations. From the 1970s to the 1980s, Jazz Fest contributed to an unprecedented boom in tourism that earned Crescent City the moniker "Creole Disneyland". In 2017, total attendance for Jazz Fest was about 425,000 over seven days, exceeding the total population of Orleans Parish per prior census estimates. Pre-COVID-19, the attendance had grown to nearly 500,000.

Over the years, the Festival has had its share of financial difficulties, as well as an identity crisis on stage and in the tents. Local African-American activists accused the Festival of exploiting its performers and under-representing the communities that made Jazz Fest possible. Internal conflicts also arose which left the 1982 Festival temporarily without board member Quint Davis, who handled the Festival's production. In 1983, Davis returned and has produced it ever since.

The year 2020 marks the first year in the Festival's fifty-year history to be cancelled because of concerns over the COVID-19 pandemic. The event was rescheduled to take place in the Fall 2021, October 8–17, which is within the Atlantic hurricane season.

== Yearly posters ==
For every Jazz Fest from 1984 to 2020 & since 2022, there have been a series of posters released that are related to that year's event. These posters have become some of the most widely recognized pieces of art in the New Orleans/Louisiana area. They are sold at the festival and after the festival online and in many art stores around the area. Posters gain significant value as time goes on.

== Festival features ==
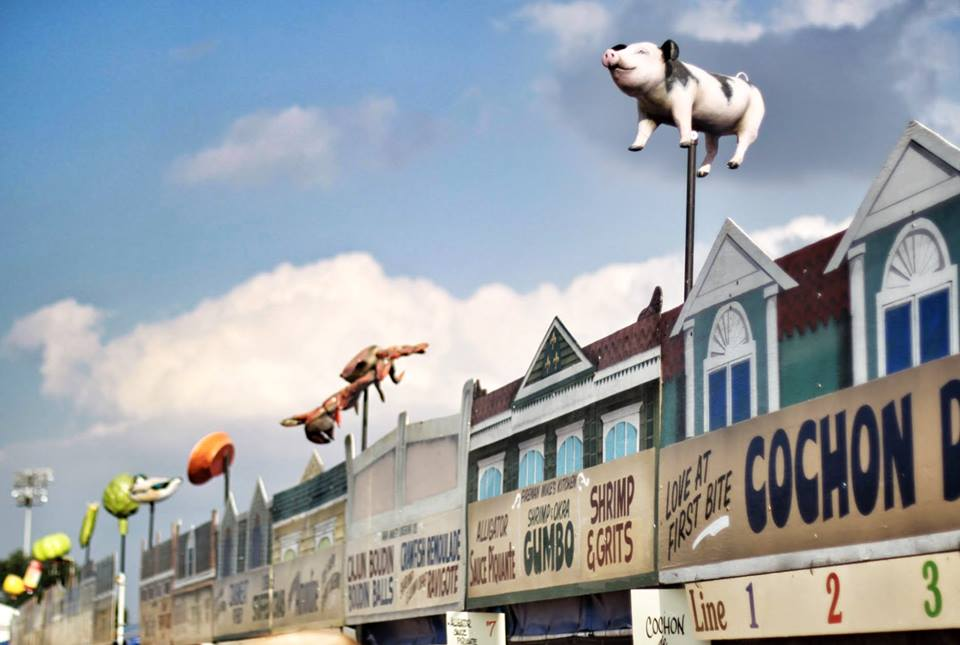
Food stands at the 2014 Jazz Fest

The Festival features a variety of local food and craft vendors. The official food policy of the Festival is "no carnival food". There are more than seventy food booths that include local dishes like crawfish beignets, cochon de lait sandwiches, alligator sausage po' boy (sandwich), boiled crawfish, softshell crab po'boy, Cajun jambalaya, jalapeño bread, fried green tomatoes, Oyster patties, muffulettas, red beans and rice, and crawfish Monica. Vegan and vegetarian options are also available. All food vendors are small, locally owned businesses. Jazz Fest ranks second to Mardi Gras in terms of local economic impact.

Craft vendors are set up throughout the grounds, as are craft-making demonstrations. There are three main areas including the Congo Square African Marketplace, which features crafts from local, national, and international artisans; the Contemporary Crafts area, which features handmade clothing, leather goods, jewelry, paintings, sculptures, and musical instruments; and the Louisiana Marketplace, which displays baskets, hand-colored photographs, jewelry and landscape-themed art.

The Festival allocates large areas dedicated to cultural and historical practices unique to Louisiana. There are depictions of the many cultures that exist in the state, such as the Cajun culture, and the Los Isleños, who are descendants of native Canary Islanders. Some of the areas include the Louisiana Folklife Village, which focuses on state art and culture, the Native American Village and the Grandstand. The National Endowment of the Arts has recognized many the work of many of the folk demonstrators.

Parades are also held throughout the event. They include parades by the Mardi Gras Indians, marching bands, brass bands, and social aid and pleasure clubs.

== Stages and tents ==
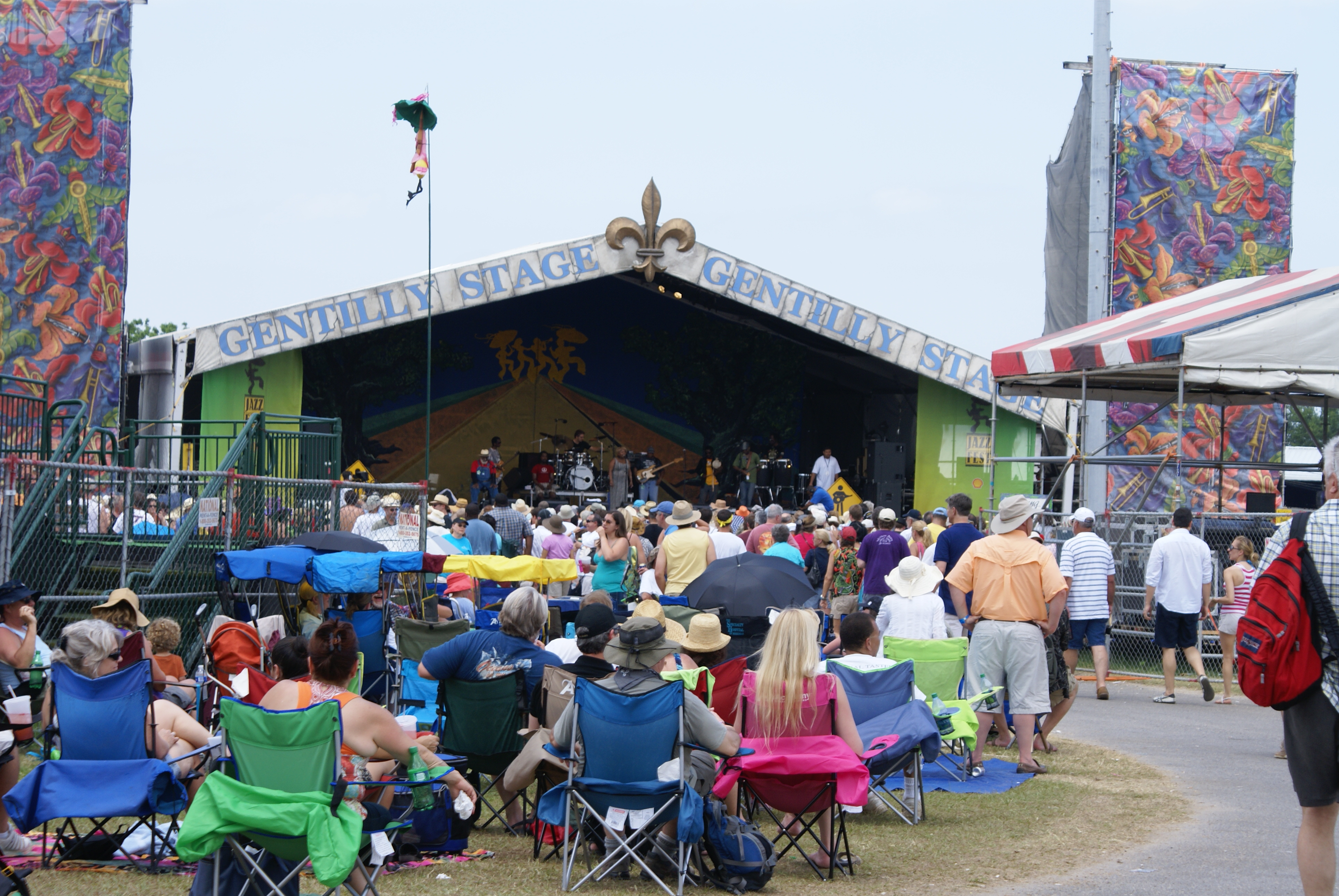
Gentilly Stage, 2011 Jazz Fest

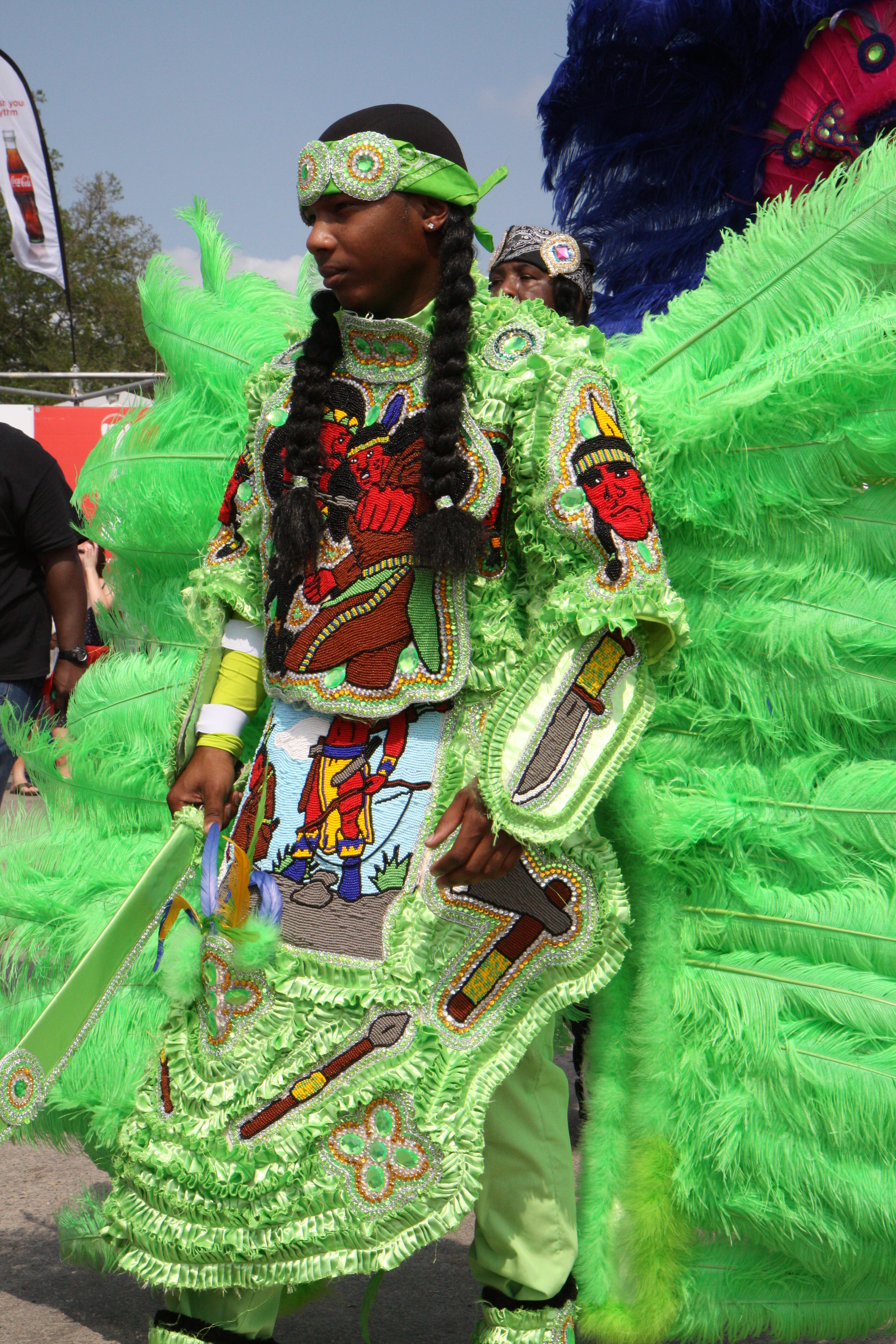
Mardi Gras Indian.

Jazz Fest grew to become one of the best festivals to watch local artists and musicians, such as the Rebirth Brass Band, Juvenile, and Fats Domino, in addition to well-known musicians like Ray Charles, Tina Turner and James Brown in the Tremé backyard. After 1972, the festival moved to the Gentilly community. By 2010, Jazz Fest had become more commercialized with headliners such as the Eagles, Foo Fighters and Christina Aguilera, shifting away from its jazz-dominated roots. At the 2026 festival, Stevie Nicks performed "Don't Stop", the first time in 15 years.

The festival has various performance stages including:

Stage Name	Description
Festival Stage	Largest stage featuring national and local headliners
Gentilly Stage	Secondary stage featuring national and local headliners
Congo Square Stage	Features music reflecting the African and multi-cultural heritage of New Orleans
Blues Tent	Focused primarily on blues artists
Jazz Tent	National and local contemporary jazz artists
Gospel Tent	Gospel musicians, performers, and choirs
Jazz & Heritage Stage	Features New Orleans brass bands and "Mardi Gras Indians"
Fais Do Do Stage	Zydeco and Cajun artists from Louisiana, along with national Americana acts
Economy Hall Tent	Traditional New Orleans jazz artists and performances
Lagniappe Stage	Eclectic mix of national and local artists
Allison Miner Music Heritage Stage	Panel discussions and interviews with national and local artists
Cultural Exchange Pavilion Stage	Features artists from each year's featured country
Rhythmpourium Tent	Performances primarily from local artists and book/record signings
Children's Tent	Performances aimed at young audiences
Food Heritage Stage	Live cooking demonstrations featuring Louisiana food

The Congo Square stage name pays homage to a gathering place where enslaved black people would meet to sell goods to buy their freedom, play instruments, and dance. Under the Code Noir, Catholic slavemasters allowed their slaves to have Sundays off. That day off helped to preserve the tradition and spirit of African dancing and drumming. The name of the gathering area was changed to Louis Armstrong Park, where drummers traditionally perform on Sundays in honor of their enslaved ancestors.

In 2015, Jazz Fest honored the 40th birthday of New Orleans Center for Creative Arts (NOCCA). Displays included student artwork; live performances of spoken word and musical theater were featured at the Cultural Pavilion. NOCCA Alumni showcased their musical talents at the Zatarains/WWOZ Jazz Tent, where they paid homage to the legacy of Ellis Marsalis Jr. The festival has an ongoing partnership with local schools like NOCCA to give young artists an opportunity to showcase their talents to a larger audience.

== Performers ==
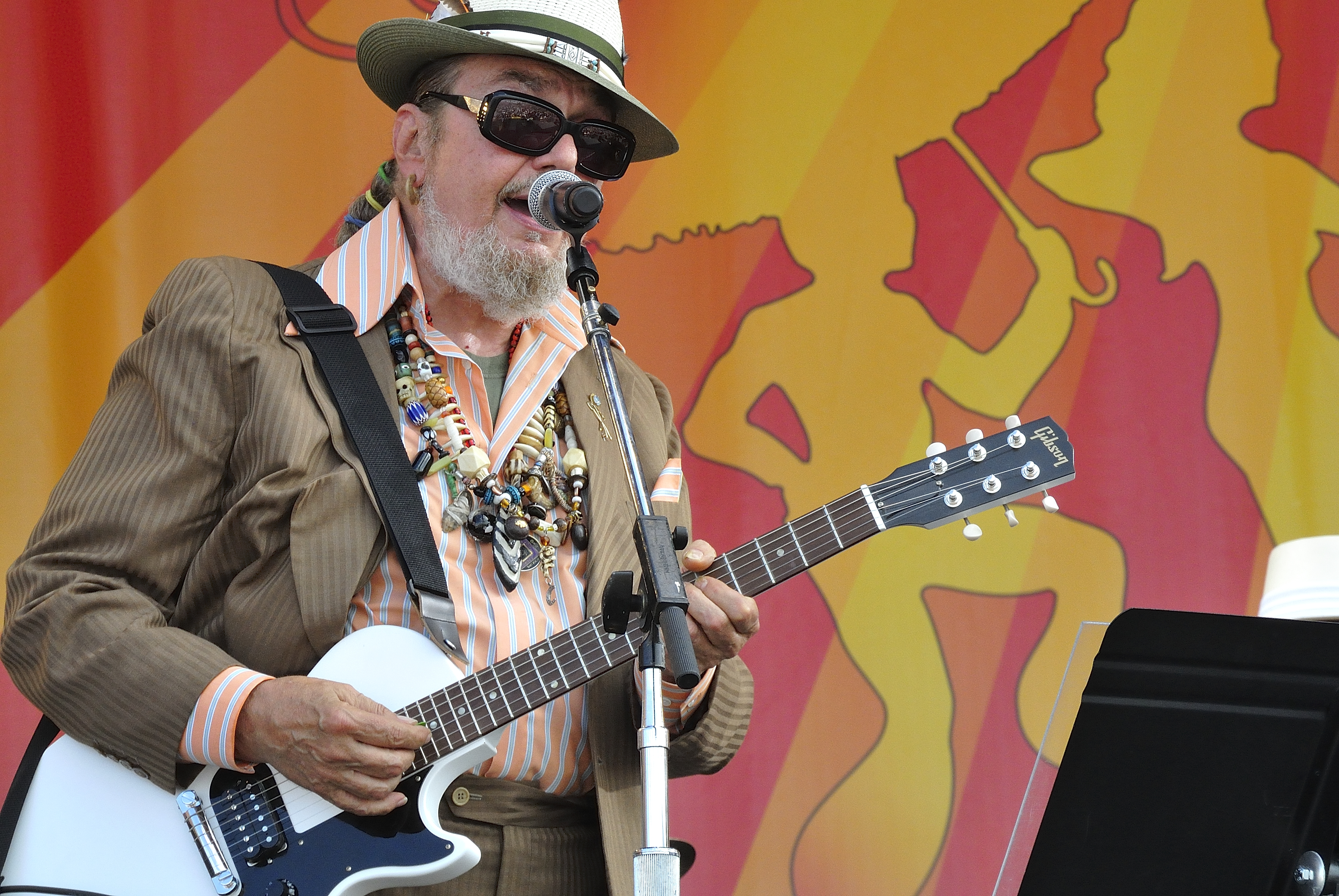
Dr. John performing at Jazz Fest

The festival has featured a variety of musicians and performers every year since its founding, ranging from Louisiana musicians to international pop stars. Many popular New Orleans musicians have played annually for long stretches over the history of the festival such as the Neville Brothers, Dr. John, Ellis Marsalis, and The Radiators.

Applications to perform (from the general public) are limited to bands from Louisiana to promote and preserve local culture.

== The New Orleans Jazz and Heritage Foundation ==
The New Orleans Jazz and Heritage Foundation is a 501(c)(3) organization that presents the New Orleans Jazz and Heritage Festival. The foundation was formed in 1970 as the festival's nonprofit arm. Festival founders George Wein, Quint Davis and Allison Miner trusted that Jazz Fest would be a success, despite a slow start in ticket sales. Their foresight led to the decision to establish the New Orleans Jazz and Heritage Foundation as a nonprofit, allowing the opportunity to give the proceeds back to the local community by way of cultural programming when revenue increased.

Over the years, festival revenue increased, but the Foundation struggled to cover costs associated with its programs. In 2004, Don Marshall was brought on board as the Foundation's executive director. Other sources of funding come from galas and special events, corporate donors, individual donations and public and private grants.

The Foundation operates with a full-time staff and a four-part board of directors that includes a voting board, advisory council, Past Presidents Senate and an Honor Council. Its mission statement says: "The New Orleans Jazz & Heritage Festival and Foundation, Inc. promotes, preserves, perpetuates and encourages the music, culture and heritage of communities in Louisiana through festivals, programs and other cultural, educational, civic and economic activities."

The Foundation maintains active involvement with the local community through its assets, programming and educational enrichment. The local programs range from teaching Jazz to local teens, to preserving recordings, artifacts and interviews. The programs aid in economic growth by providing jobs for local artists and entertainers while offering entertainment to citizens.

=== Foundation assets ===
The following resources were created by the Foundation as sources of funding to provide year-round programming that focuses on cultural education, economic development and cultural enrichment.

- The New Orleans Jazz & Heritage Festival
- WWOZ 90.7 FM – a local radio station based in the French Quarter with programs by volunteers whose mission is "to be the worldwide voice, archive, and flag-bearer of New Orleans culture and musical heritage". In 2020, the station celebrated its 40th anniversary and gained national news coverage after its efforts to provide a sense of "normalcy" in response to the COVID-19 pandemic. WWOZ 90.7 FM broadcasts live during Jazz Fest and provides local, cultural content year round.
- Jazz & Heritage Foundation Archive – an educational resource that acts as a repository for items of historical and cultural importance in Louisiana. The Archive consists mainly of recordings from the Festival, but also features magazines, posters, film and photographs. The artifacts are available for scholarly research, and fellowships are granted to encourage use of the archive.
- The George & Joyce Wein Jazz & Heritage Center – a performance and education venue that also serves as the location for the Don "Moose" Jamison Heritage School of Music and the Foundations year-round programming. The center is named after Jazz Fest founder George Wein and his wife, Joyce.
- The Jazz & Heritage Gala – a celebration that raises funds for free music education in New Orleans. The proceeds are donated to the Don "Moose" Jamison Heritage School of Music which provides music education to over 280 students in the city.

=== Educational programming ===
- Don "Moose" Jamison Heritage School of Music – The School of Music is the Foundation's unique cultural education program which began in 1990 as an after-school program. Initially, the school was tuition-free and taught only a few students on the campus of Southern University at New Orleans. In 2014, the George and Joyce Wein Jazz & Heritage Center opened in Tremé. The center is the permanent location of the School and instructs over 200 students each week. Classes now range from after-school to weekends and utilize instrumental techniques, ear training and composition to teach the art of music and performance.
- Tom Dent Congo Square Lecture Series – Tom Dent (1932–1998), born to Ernestine and Albert W. Dent. Dent was an African-American cultural activist and poet from New Orleans. He was influenced by cultural writers of African-American struggles. Dent served as the executive director of the Foundation from 1987 to 1990. While serving on the board, he founded the Congo Square Lecture Series. After his death, the name was changed to The Tom Dent Congo Square Lecture series in his honor. The series was created to engage local creatives in scholarly conversations surrounding culture and African-American history. Topics range from Jazz and Creole history, Carnival around the world and the evolution of jazz funerals in New Orleans.
- Class Got Brass Contest – a 'Battle of the Brass Bands' for all middle and high schools in Louisiana that was created to encourage school band programs to participate in the musical culture of New Orleans. The winner receives music education funds for their school. Prizes range from $1,000 to $10,000 and non-winners receive a $1,000 stipend for participating. Each band is limited to 12 members, and each member must be currently enrolled in the competing school. Judges consider originality, adherence to tradition, improvisation, tightness and overall presentation when deciding winners.
- Songwriting Workshops for Kids with PJ Morton – a series of songwriting workshops that are open to middle and high school students in New Orleans. The workshops and applications are free but are limited to 30 students. Students learn songwriting techniques from PJ Morton.
- Mardi Gras Indian Beading and African Drumming Workshops – a series of free workshops that take place at the George and Joyce Wein Jazz & Heritage Center. Beading workshops are led by Howard Miller, the chief of the Creole Wild West Mardi Gras Indian tribe. Miller teaches the workshops to students ages 10–17 in New Orleans. Drumming workshops are led by Luther Gray, head of the Congo Square Preservation Society. Gray provides drums to students who cannot provide their own.

=== Economic development programming ===
- Jazz & Heritage Music Relief Fund – a statewide relief fund to support musicians who have lost income due to the COVID-19 pandemic. The pandemic caused venue closures all around the world and left many New Orleans' musicians without a source of income. The Fund has provided emergency grants to over 2500 musicians in the city and the campaign for fundraising is ongoing. Donations continue to be received from organizations like Spotify, Michael Murphy Productions, the Goldring Foundation and the Bentson Foundation.
- Community Partnership Grants – proceeds from the Festival are invested back into the community. Over $8 million has been redistributed through community partnership grants to fund cultural projects, all of which must align with the Foundation's mission. Recent category additions include the Louisiana Cultural Equity Arts Grant which allows BIPOC creatives to focus on creating new works. Applications are accepted from all over Louisiana, and represent a wide range of diversity.
- Jazz & Heritage Film Festival – the Foundation works with the New Orleans Video Access Center to put on a festival that showcases documentaries about south Louisiana or that are produced by New Orleans filmmakers. The festival lasts three days and includes screenings and networking for film industry professionals. A majority of the featured films have been awarded funding from the Foundation's Community Partnership Grants. The festival takes place in February at the George and Joyce Wein Jazz & Heritage Center.
- The Catapult Fund – the Foundation supports the local restaurant industry by providing small business owners with funding and business training by way of the Catapult Fund. Funding partners of the Catapult Fund have included Capital One Bank, the Louisiana Small Business Development Center (LSBDC,) the Louisiana Cultural Economy Foundation (LCEF,) and the Ashé Cultural Arts Center. The Fund is open to small business owners in the food and beverage and culinary arts industry. These businesses can include LLC's, sole proprietorships, and incorporated businesses. Over a period of five months, accepted applicants attend 17 free instructional classes focused on business development. Those who participate in the course receive a food safety training certification and leave with new knowledge of key strategies for running a successful business by addressing solutions to the unique challenges the restaurant sector faces in New Orleans. Additionally, a grant pool of $50,000 is portioned and rewarded to participants who successfully complete the course.

=== Cultural enrichment programming ===
- Jazz & Heritage Concerts – the Jazz & Heritage Concert Series consists of concerts presented by the Foundation throughout the year, in the off-season of Jazz Fest. The concerts are admission free and held at the George and Joyce Wein Jazz & Heritage Center. The Foundation also presents two free concerts during Jazz Fest each year. The concerts not only highlight local favorites but artists from different parts of the country. The concert series has followed themes that highlight underrepresented populations. The most recent series, titled "Chanteuse: Celebrating New Orleans Women in Music", was scheduled for the weekend of March 13, 2020, but was postponed because of the COVID-19 pandemic. The series focuses on women and/or femme-identifying persons to bring attention to the lack of female representation in the music industry. Reports show that women accounted for 21.7% of all artists in 2019, and the ratio of male to female producers was 37 to 1. Cyrille Aimée, Germaine Bazzle and Maggie Koerner were among the artists initially scheduled to perform. A visual arts exhibit called Femme Fest, sponsored by the Women's Caucus for Art of Louisiana (WCALA,) was set to be featured at the Jazz & Heritage Art Gallery as a part of the series as well.
- Crescent City Blues & BBQ Festival – the Crescent City Blues & BBQ Festival is a free celebration of music, food and art presented by the Foundation. The festivities typically take place in Lafayette Square and showcase artists like Little Freddie King.
- Treme' Creole Gumbo Festival and Congo Square Rhythms Festival – the Treme’ Creole Gumbo Festival and the Congo Square Rhythms Festival are admission free festivals presented by the Foundation, and are typically held in Armstrong Park. In 2019 the Congo Square Rhythms Festival took place simultaneously; therefore, the two could work together to increase their impact on the city. African Drumming, Jazz, Funk and Gospel are among the performances that represent the African diaspora's cultural impact on New Orleans.
- Louisiana Cajun-Zydeco Festival – an admission free festival presented by the Foundation that focuses on Cajun and Zydeco music and takes place in the Spring at Armstrong Park. Much like other Foundation festivals, local art, food and entertainment are showcased at this annual two-day event. Vendors sell seafood, especially crawfish, while art markets and youth activities are available.
- Johnny Jackson Jr. Gospel Is Alive Celebration – an outreach program for senior citizens in New Orleans. The concert is admission free and held at the Franklin Avenue Baptist Church. Foundation board member, Johnny Jackson Jr. supported this specific concert from its onset in 1990. It was eventually named after him in honor of his support. Past performers have included the Gospel Soul Children and Rance Allen. Each year Gospel Is Alive! recognizes those who have contributed to the gospel community in a significant way.

== See also ==
- List of jazz festivals
- French Quarter Festival
- Satchmo SummerFest
