= Ernestine Jessie Covington Dent =

American musician and community leader

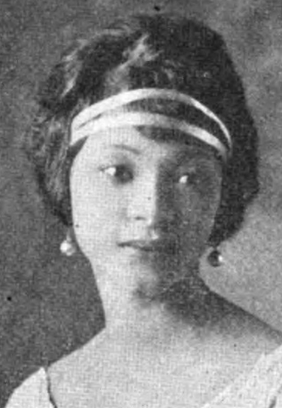
- Ernestine Jessie Covington, from a 1925 issue of The Crisis
- Born: Ernestine Jessie Covington; May 19, 1904; Houston, Texas
- Died: March 10, 2001 (aged 96); New Orleans, Louisiana
- Occupation: Pianist
- Spouse: Albert W. Dent
- Children: 3 (Thomas Dent, Benjamin Albert Dent, Walter Jesse Dent)

Ernestine Jessie Covington Dent (May 19, 1904 – March 10, 2001) was an American pianist, music educator, and community leader. She was the wife of Dillard University president Albert W. Dent, and the mother of poet and activist Thomas Dent.

== Early life and education ==
Ernestine Jessie Covington was born in Houston, Texas, the daughter of Benjamin Jesse Covington and Jennie Belle Murphy Covington. Her father was a medical doctor; both of her parents were college graduates, and known to be musical. As prominent African-Americans in Houston, the Covingtons hosted house guests including Marian Anderson and Booker T. Washington.

Covington began studying piano and violin as a little girl, with Madame Corilla Rochon, a neighbor. By the time she was a teenager, she was playing music in a local women's orchestra and at Baptist church services.

Covington graduated at the top of her class from Houston Colored High School, and attended Oberlin Conservatory of Music as a music student from 1920 to 1924, where she was a charter member of Pi Kappa Lambda honor society. After graduating from Oberlin, she pursued further studies on scholarships at the Juilliard Musical Foundation, where she worked with James Friskin and Olga Samaroff. Covington was the first African American and the first woman to attend Juilliard. She earned a master's degree in piano at Oberlin College in 1934, with a thesis on the compositions of Franz Liszt. Dent accomplished this with support from the Rosenwald Fund.

== Career ==
=== Music ===
Dent played piano in recitals and on radio in the 1920s and 1930s. During this time, she performed with opera singer Florence Cole Talbert. She taught music in Houston and at Bishop College in Marshall, Texas, where she chaired the piano department. She served on the board of the New Orleans Philharmonic from 1971–1976. Dent played a vital role in the desegregation of orchestra concerts in New Orleans, and she encouraged the increase of classical musicians of color in symphony orchestras and teaching positions. In 1985, she was the first recipient of the Fine Arts Award from the Amistad Research Center.

=== Community leadership ===
Dent retired from performing in 1936, but remained active as a clubwoman, and was a social presence as a university president's wife from 1941 to 1969. As official hostess at Dillard University, she welcomed into her home prominent guests, including Martin Luther King Jr., Duke Ellington, Thurgood Marshall, and Eleanor Roosevelt.

Dent was a founding member of the Flint-Goodridge Hospital Women's Auxiliary as well as the New Orleans chapter of the historically black sorority Delta Sigma Theta. She was credited for inspiring the creation of the Ebony Fashion Fair, a touring event that raised funds for college scholarships and other charities.

== Personal life and legacy ==
Ernestine Covington married college president Albert W. Dent in 1931, in a "brilliant wedding" in Houston. Composer and Howard University music professor Camille Nickerson played the organ at the ceremony, and Manet Harrison Fowler was a soprano soloist; biologist Samuel M. Nabrit stood as Dent's best man. They had three sons. Their eldest son, Thomas Covington Dent (1932) became a poet and civil rights activist. She was widowed when Albert Dent died in 1984, and she died in 2001, aged 96 years. The Albert and Jessie Covington Dent Papers are archived in the Amistad Research Center. There was a Jessie Covington Dent Music Festival in 1998, and there is a Jessie Covington Dent Memorial Scholarship in Music, both at Dillard University, named in her memory.
