= Clifton Johnson =

Clifton Johnson may refer to:

- Clifton Johnson (jurist) (1941–2009)
- Clifton Johnson (author) (1865–1940)
- Clifton H. Johnson (1921–2008), historian
