= Crawfish Monica =

Louisiana food tradition

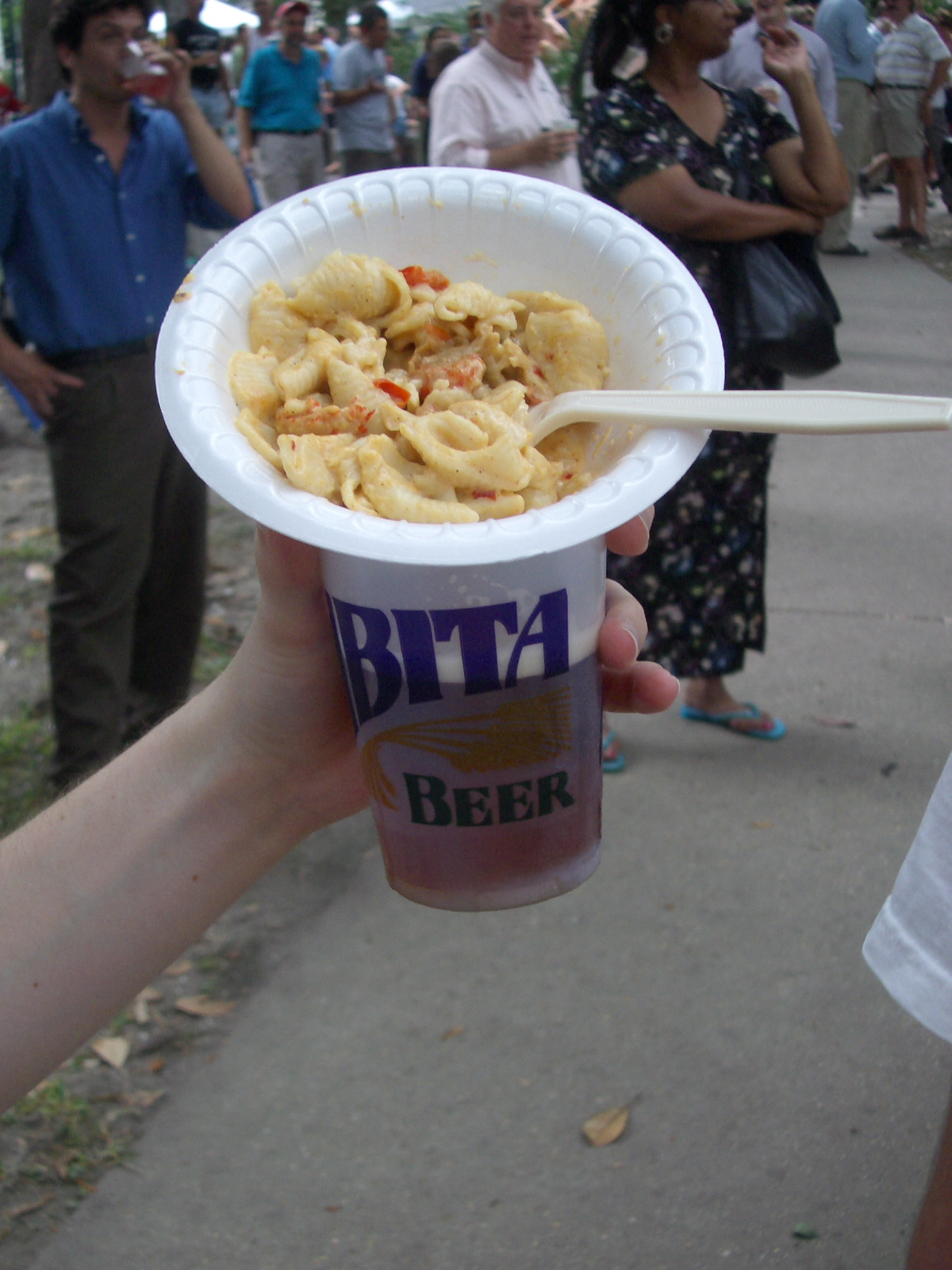
A bowl of crawfish Monica using shell pasta held over an Abita beer at a free Wednesday concert in Lafayette Square, New Orleans

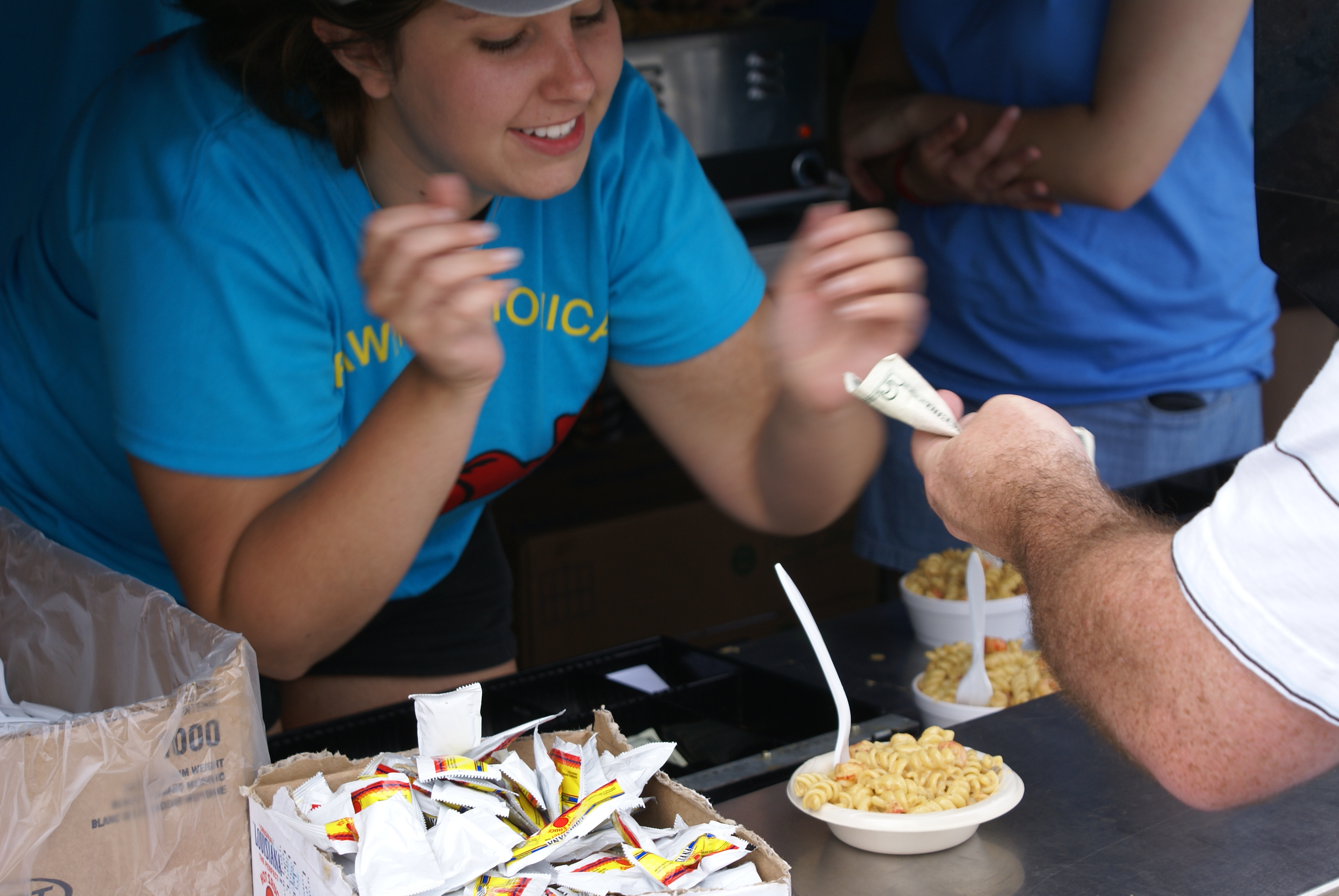
Crawfish Monica at the 2011 New Orleans Jazz Fest

Crawfish Monica is a Louisiana food tradition. Ingredients include pasta (often rotini), crawfish tail meat, onion, garlic, creole seasoning, cream, wine, salt, pepper, and butter. The dish was created by chef Pierre Hilzim who is the head of Kajun Kettle Foods. He named it after his wife Monica Davidson. Parsley can be used as a garnish. Shrimp, crabmeat and oysters can be substituted for crawfish.
