= Flint-Goodridge Hospital =

Defunct hospital in New Orleans, Louisiana, U.S.

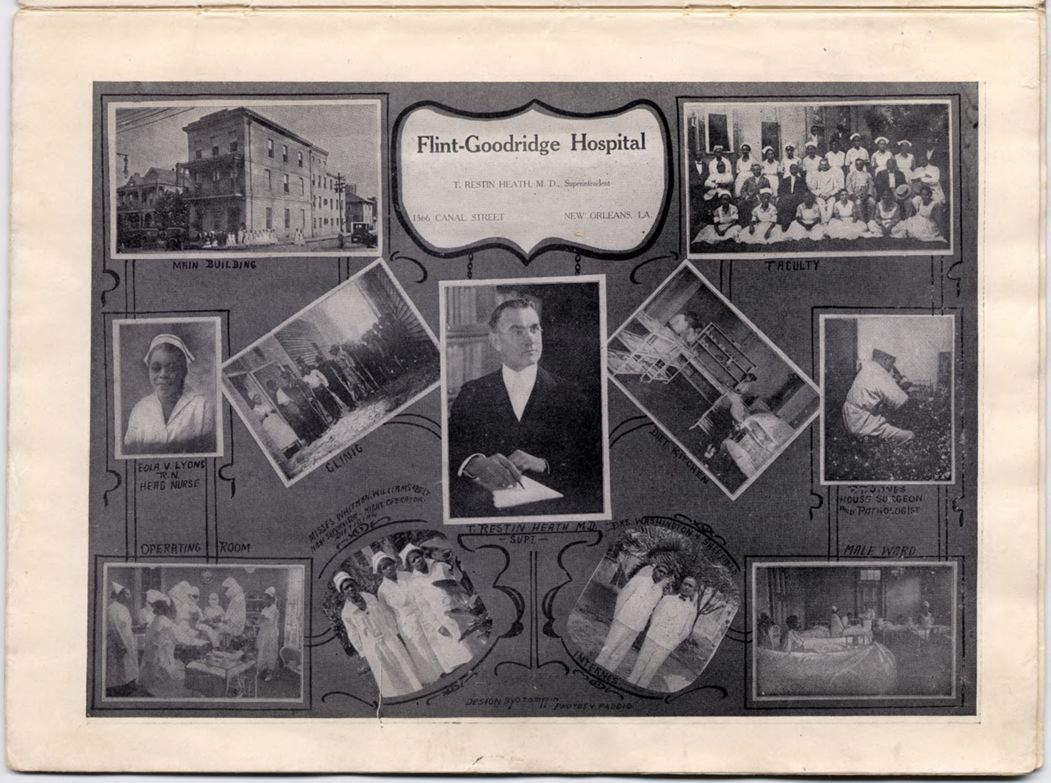

Geography
- Location: New Orleans, Louisiana, United States of America

Organisation
- Affiliated university: Dillard University

History
- Former names: Phyllis Wheatley Sanitarium and Training School for Negro Nurses
- Opened: 1896
- Closed: 1983

Links
- Other links: African-American history

- Flint-Goodridge Hospital
- U.S. National Register of Historic Places
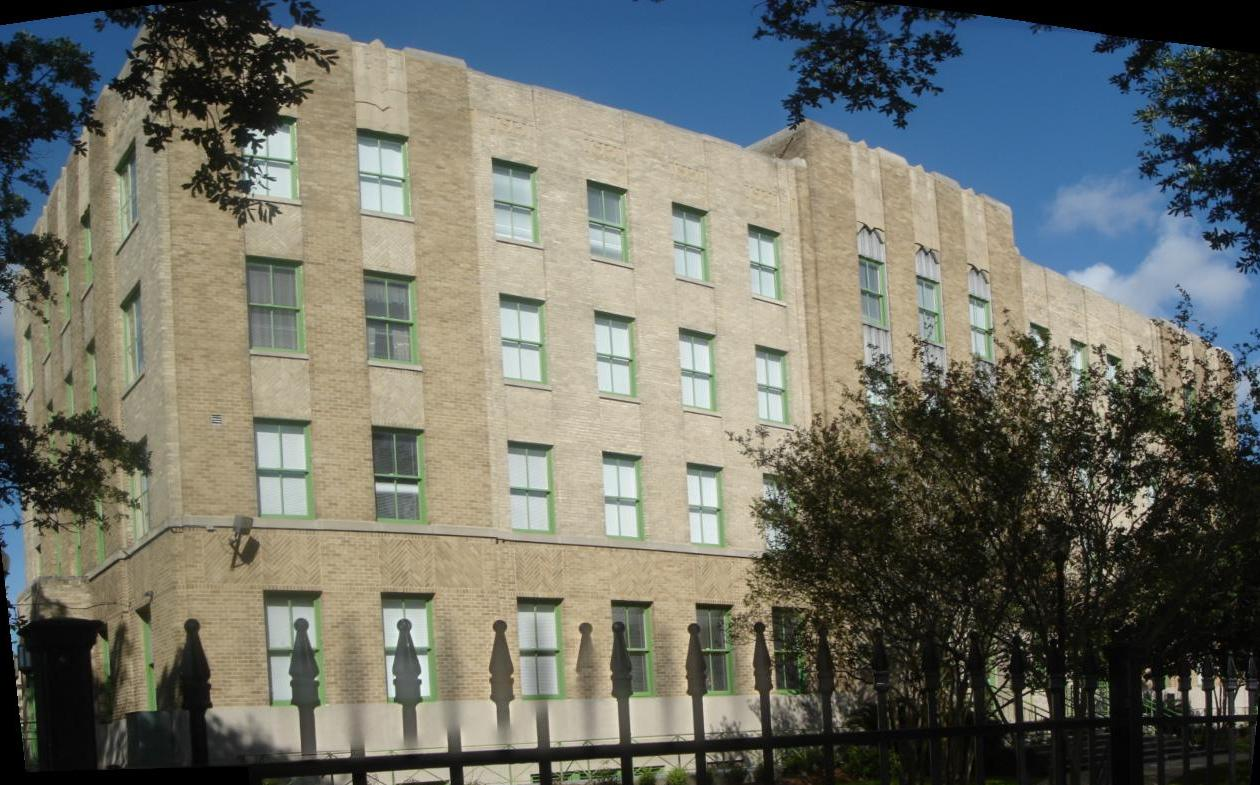
- Flint-Goodridge Hospital of Dillard University (Louisiana Ave. building)
- Location: 2425 Louisiana Ave, New Orleans, LA 70115
- Coordinates: 29.936602°N 90.094437°W
- Built: February 1, 1932 (Louisiana Ave. building)
- Architectural style: Art Deco
- NRHP reference No.: 73974326
- Added to NRHP: January 1, 1989

Flint-Goodridge Hospital was a hospital in New Orleans, Louisiana. For almost a century (1896–1983) it served predominantly African-American patients and was the first black hospital in the South. For most of these years, was owned and operated by Dillard University, a historically black university. From 1932 until its closing in 1983 it was located on Louisiana Avenue in uptown New Orleans. Its former Louisiana Avenue facility is now listed in the US National Register of Historic Places.

== History ==
=== Early years (1896–1928) ===
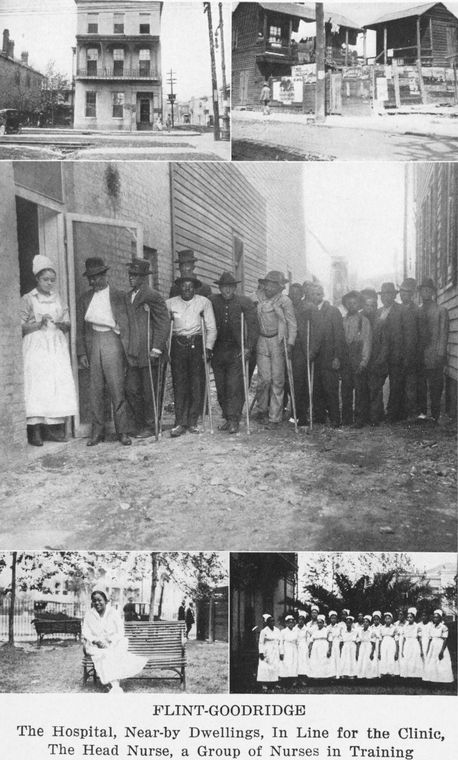
Flint Goodridge Hospital in 1922

According to Kevin McQueeney, after the Civil War thousands of African Americans who were formerly slaves migrated to New Orleans. By 1890, the black population in New Orleans approached 60,000. Many of the city's poor black population lived in squalid conditions, and the mortality rate was high in comparison to whites of the time, while access to adequate health care was limited. All of the existing private hospitals refused to treat black patients. In 1894, the New Orleans chapter of the Phyllis Wheatley Club set out to create a black hospital.

The hospital began as the Phyllis Wheatley Sanitarium and Training School for Negro Nurses and was run by the Phyllis Wheatly Club. It was the first black hospital in the South. The training school included hospital care and was founded in 1896, operating under the administration of the Phyllis Wheatley Club and located in the Medical College facility of New Orleans University, which was run by the Methodist Episcopal Church. Needing increased financing to maintain the hospital and because of a lack of financial support, the school was taken under the wing of New Orleans University and merged with the school's Medical College hospital. The efforts of Methodist Episcopal Church Bishop Willard Francis Mallalieu, the school was able to enlist the aid of John Flint of Fall River, Massachusetts, who donated $25,000 to the institution. Flint lobbied Caroline Mudge of Boston to donate money to buy a building for the hospital. In 1901, the name of the hospital was changed to Sarah Goodridge Hospital and Nurse Training School and the name of the medical college to Flint Medical College of New Orleans University, in honor of John Flint. Flint donated an additional $10,000 to purchase a new property at 1566 Canal Street, which would house the Flint Medical College. From 1901 to 1911, it graduated a total of 164 physicians and pharmacists.

The Flint Medical College closed in 1911, when the American Medical Association, under increasingly stringent guidelines, deemed its facilities unacceptable. (Note: McQueeney mentions that it closed in 1912. However the National Medical Association mentions 1911.) The school closed after being given a scathing evaluation by the Flexner Report that the school "was in no position to make any contribution of value" but recommended Howard and Meharry medical school remain open. In 1915 the School of Pharmacy closed. That year all of the buildings were placed under the use of the Sarah Goodridge Hospital, which continued to operate under the administration of the Methodist Episcopal Church. and in 1916 a renovation was done on the facilities, which had fallen into disrepair. The buildings at Canal and Robertson streets, which had been used by both the Flint Medical College and the Sarah Goodridge Hospital and Nurses Training School, were converted into a 50-bed hospital and a nurse' residence. The hospital merged with the Flint Medical College and was renamed Flint-Goodridge Hospital. The Nurse Training Department was reorganized and continued under the management of New Orleans University.

=== Dillard University governance (1929–1983) ===
In 1930 New Orleans University and Straight College merged to form Dillard University, a historically black university, which would own and operate the hospital henceforth. A campaign was initiated to raise $2,000,000 for a completely new facility for the hospital. After funds were secured, the new facility was erected in Uptown New Orleans at 2425 Louisiana Avenue, at the intersection of LaSalle Street. On February 1, 1932, the dedication ceremony was held. The hospital was located next to the Magnolia Housing Projects.

==== Under the directorship of Albert Walter Dent (1929–1949) ====
The board of trustees at Dillard, under the leadership of New Orleans businessperson and philanthropist Edgar B. Stern Sr, needed a dynamic and capable leader to serve as the superintendent of the hospital, so in 1929 they selected the twenty-seven-year-old Morehouse alumnus from Atlanta, Albert Walter Dent. Dent had to find a way to help his staff complete their residencies, which had been a challenge due to the lack of opportunities for African American doctors during segregation. He enlisted the aid of white doctors from Tulane and Louisiana State University to serve as consultants to the hospitals' various departments, conducting regular post-graduate seminars. Such actions were praised as models of black and white cooperation. Construction began on a new hospital facility designed by Dillard University architect Moise Goldsteinat at a cost of approximately one-half million dollars, which opened in 1932 at the address of 2425 Louisiana Avenue next to Howard Street and LaSalle.

During Dent's tenure the postgraduate course for physicians in the South was established. Dent expanded the number of hospital beds allotted to free care from twenty percent to fifty percent and reduced expenses, while taking advantage of New Deal programs such as the National Youth Administration, which provided training for nurses and orderlies. Because such programs were funded by the Federal government, it allowed the hospital to use money that would have gone into those expenses towards patient care and services, such as maternity care. Dent convinced the board to offer a flat rate of ten dollars for maternity expenses. In addition to increasing services for the indigent, he attempted to increase the number of paying patients, by offering a once cent pay-a-day plan, underwritten by a Rosenwald Fund donation. In 1941 Dent was asked by Dillard University's board of trustees to leave his post at the hospital in order to become the university's third president. He served in that position for the next twenty-eight years. His two successors as superintendent at the hospital were John L. Procope and Dr. S Tanner, however, their tenures were brief, made more troublesome with the prospect of Second World War. During this period the hospital became burdened with debt.

==== Clifton Caldwell Wiell era (1949–1970) ====
In 1949 Clifton Caldwell Weill, a protégé of Dent, became the superintendent and would serve in that capacity until 1970. In 1953 a separate board from that of the university was set up for the hospital. The previous superintendent's wife, Mrs. Albert Walker Dent, came up with a plan to hold fashion shows to raise funds for the hospital, and she contacted John H. Johnson the publisher and editor of Jet and Ebony magazines to enlist their sponsorship. The first Ebony fashion fair for the hospital was held in 1958. Over the years, the fair grew into a traveling event which raised funds for various causes, amongst which remained Flint Goodridge Hospital.

In 1958 Weill began a campaign to build a new addition onto the hospital. More than 1.3 million dollars were raised, and the four-story ninety-six bed wing was completed in 1960, adding 96 beds and allowing for the expansion of the Physical Therapy Department. The hospital was newly equipped with pipe air, room telephones, and a nurse-patient intercom system. An intensive care unit was built in 1963 and a coronary unit was added in 1968, which featured the latest cardiac devices such as heart monitors, defibrillators, and pacemakers. Also in 1968, a nurses' residence was built near to the hospital on Louisiana Ave. and Saratoga St. In 1970 Weill completed his twenty-first and final year as superintendent.

==== Decline and closure (1970–1983) ====
Though the hospital released a report in May 1969 anticipating growth, envisioning plans for expansion and modernization, as a result of the desegregation measures of the 1960s, Flint Goodridge experienced a decline in patients over the intervening years, which eventually brought about its closure. Investment banker Keith Butler waged an effort to sell the hospital to a group of African American physicians, but failed. In 1983 the hospital was sold to National Medical Enterprises, however, they opted not to use the facility as a hospital—Flint-Goodrige closed. The building that once housed the hospital still stands today at 2425 Louisiana Avenue and is now the Flint-Goodridge Apartments.

Concerning the demise of the hospital, archivist Florence Borders commented:

... it comes at a time ... when we have called ourselves having made certain gains, therefore having more black doctors to practice and now with no black hospital to control. I find it sad that when the hospital was struggling in the Depression it was successful and now, after a period of affluence, it was not.

== Legacy ==
For much of the twentieth century Flint Goodridge functioned as an African American-owned hospital serving the needs of the black community in New Orleans. Many prominent black physicians spent all or parts of their careers working at Flint-Goodridge. According to Kevin McQueeney:

Hospitals, when considered as health centers and not just as health-care providers, are revealed to be driving engines of twentieth-century urban life, affecting education, labor, and land usage. Flint Goodridge certainly played an important and innovative role in black health care through its clinics, postgraduate courses, and nationally known “Penny a Day” insurance plan; it was also recognized as the largest black employer in the state.

The former Louisiana Avenue facility of Flint-Goodrige Hospital erected in 1932 is listed in US National Register of Historic Places (NRHP) and was entered on January 1, 1989.
