= Florence Borders =

American archivist, historian, and librarian (1924–2018)

- Born: February 24, 1924; New Iberia, Louisiana, U.S.
- Died: September 7, 2018 (aged 94); New Orleans, Louisiana, U.S.
- Education: Southern University (BA); Rosary College; Louisiana State University
- Occupations: Archivist; historian; librarian
- Spouse: James B. Borders III
- Children: 3

Florence Edwards Borders (February 24, 1924 – September 7, 2018) was an American archivist, historian, and librarian. She specialized in the preservation of African American historical artifacts, especially those related to Afro-Louisianans.

== Early life and education ==
Florence Borders was born on February 24, 1924, in New Iberia, Louisiana. 18 months later, she and her family moved to New Orleans. She graduated from McDonogh #35 High School and attended Southern University in Baton Rouge, her father's alma mater, for a BA in English. She attended Rosary College, now Dominican University, for a second bachelor's degree and a master's in Library Science.

Borders completed her post-master's study at Louisiana State University's Graduate Library Sciences School, and continued to study at several universities and institutions across the country, including the Library and Archives Institute of the Ohio Historical Society, Atlanta University, Case-Western Reserve University, the Ford Foundation Institute at Hofstra University, the National Archives, the Library of Congress Institute in Philadelphia, and the Society of Southwest Archivists Institute in Dallas.

She and husband James B. Borders III had two sons, James IV and Sylvanus Edwards, and one daughter, Thais.

== Career ==
In the 1940s, Borders worked as a library assistant at the University of Chicago; she was the first African-American librarian hired by the school.

She laterbecame a librarian at Bethune-Cookman College, where she met her husband, a musician and educator named James B. Borders III.

She held other similar positions at Tennessee State University and Grambling State University before she trained to become an archivist. In 1970, she returned home to New Orleans.

From 1970 to 1989, Borders served as the senior archivist and "pioneer staff member" of the Amistad Research Center before retiring. However, only five months after retiring, she returned to work as head archivist for the Center for African and African-American Studies at Southern University (SUNO) from 1989 until her retirement almost 20 years later. As a scholar, she was active in engaging and promoting New Orleans and South Louisiana culture.

The Amistad Research Center holds the Florence Borders papers, 1933-2007, which includes many of her personal papers, essays, archival aids, interviews, and research.

She curated and organized many exhibits over her career through Amistad, Chicory, and SUNO. One of her projects at Amistad was as sole processor of the Thomas C. Dent Papers, 1972-1000.

She began attending meetings of the Society of American Archivists in the 1970s and in the 1980s, she helped establish the SAA Task Force on Minorities, now the Archivists and Archives of Color.

=== Publications and media ===
Borders co-founded the scholarly journal Chicory Review, which focuses on African-American history and culture. She published many of her own articles in Callaloo, the Black Music Research Journal, Louisiana Library Bulletin, and her own journal, Chicory Review, where she served as editor.

She frequently lectured at events and conferences, and served as research consultant for several films and oral histories. She worked as a researcher for The Rise and Fall of Jim Crow, and appeared in Liberty Street Blues. Marlon Riggs drew on her expertise for his documentary Black Is, Black Ain't, she was consulted for the film House Divided, and she coordinated many interviews for the oral history project "Behind the Veil: The Jim Crow Era."

== Death ==
Borders died on September 7, 2018, in New Orleans.

== Affiliations ==
- Charter member of the Society of American Archivists since 1970s
- Zeta Phi Beta sorority
- President of the New Orleans' chapter of the B Sharp Music Club
- Founder of Chicory Society of Afro-Louisiana History and Culture
- Vice President of Our Lady of Lourdes School Board
- Grants review committee of the Arts Council of New Orleans
- Consultant for the Neighborhood Revitalization Project of the Claiborne Corridor
- Consultant for Louisiana World Exposition Afro-American Pavilion
- Executive Board of Directors for Louisiana Archives and Manuscripts Association
- Greater New Orleans Archivists
- Charter Member of the Academy of Certified Archivists
- Third World Archivists

== Awards and honors ==
- Unsung Heroes Plaque awarded by the Crescent City Chapter of Links, 1987
- Mayor's Certificate of Merit awarded by the City of New Orleans, 1987
- The Callaloo Award from the University of Virginia, 1988
- Vital as a Heartbeat Award from the Urban League, 1988
- Certificate of Appreciation awarded by the Society of American Archivists, 2000
