= Pierre Hilzim =

American chef

Pierre Hilzim is a chef in New Orleans and head of Kajun Kettle Foods. He created crawfish Monica, named after his wife Monica Davidson.
