= Amistad Research Center =

African-American studies organisation

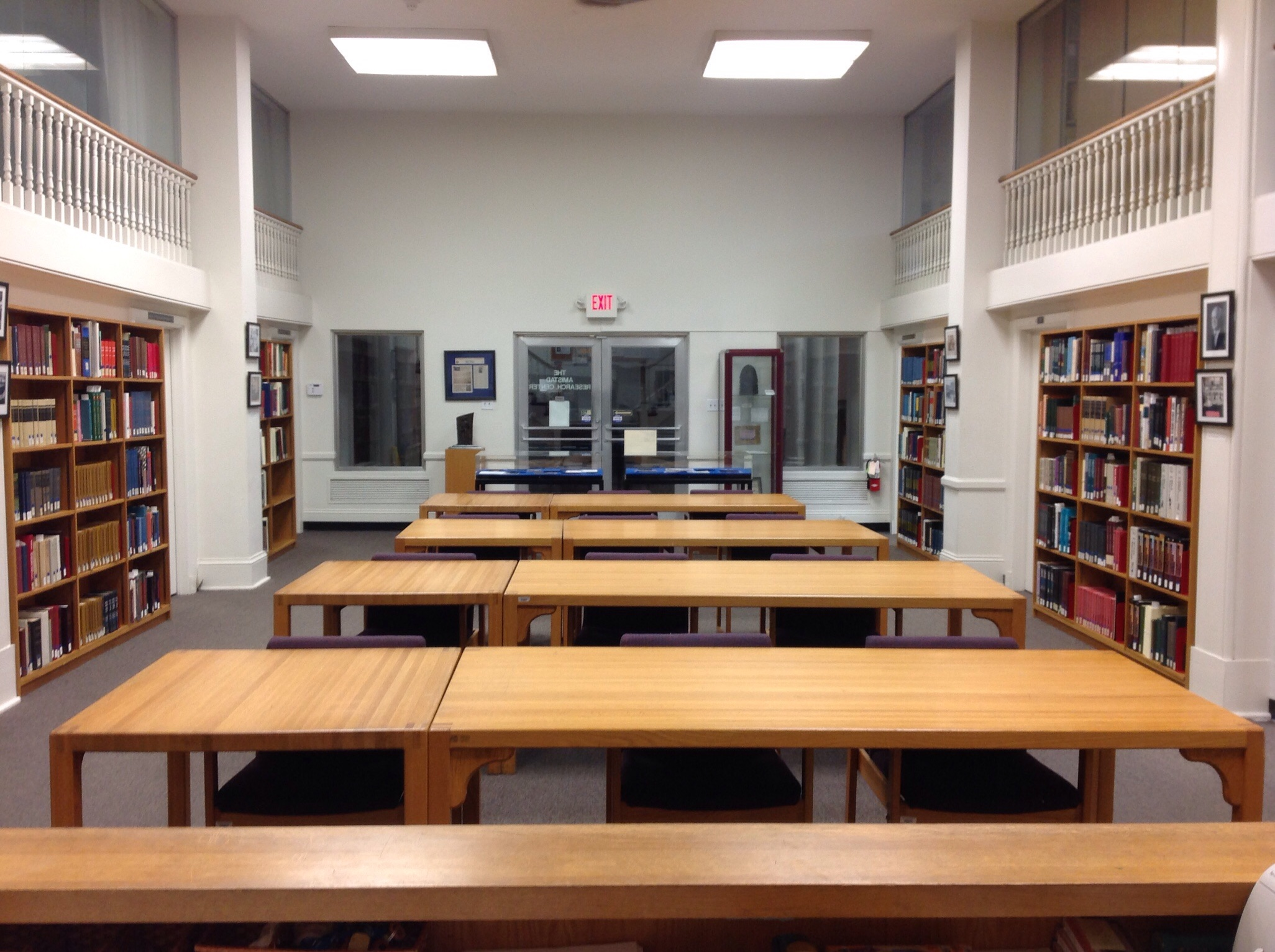
- The reading room at the Amistad Research Center
- Location: New Orleans, Louisiana, United States
- Type: Research library and archive
- Established: 1966

Collection
- Items collected: Manuscripts, books, and art
- Size: approx. 15 million

Other information
- Website: www.amistadresearchcenter.org

The Amistad Research Center (ARC) is an independent archives and manuscripts repository in the United States that specializes in the history of African Americans and ethnic minorities. It is one of the first institutions of its kind in the United States to collect African American ethnic historical records and to document the modern Civil Rights Movement.

The ARC has approximately 15 million holdings, emphasizing documents, and also including books, pamphlets, periodicals, photographs, and fine arts. It additionally has digitized holdings to enable research and education by scholars and students at locations distant from the ARC. Although the ARC documents history and race relations in the United States its holdings extend beyond African-American history and also include the ethnic heritage of Latinos, Asian Americans, Native Americans, Appalachian whites, and the LGBTQ community.

== Early history ==
=== Fisk University ===
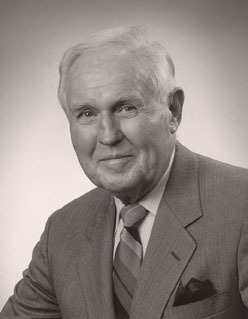
Clifton H. Johnson, founding director

The ARC traces its history to the events leading to the 1841 U.S. Supreme Court case United States v. The Amistad. The abolitionists who aided the Amistad Africans in their defense in that court case eventually helped to found the American Missionary Association (AMA), as an anti-caste, integrated abolitionist group. During and following the United States Civil War, the AMA founded hundreds of schools for the freedmen and other ethnic communities across the United States, including common schools, colleges and universities.

The AMA became a division within the Board of Home Missions of the Congregational Churches following a 1927 merger. It continued to work toward causes of civil rights, race relations, and the educational work of the church throughout the mergers of the Congregation, Christian, Evangelical and Reformed churches that occurred in 1931 and in 1956. It eventually fell under the umbrella of the United Church Boards of Homeland Ministries (UCBHM) of the United Church of Christ (UCC). As the AMA division's awareness of the problems of discrimination and segregation of African-Americans became evident, a two-day seminar on "racialism" was held at the Broadway Tabernacle Church in New York City in October 1941. The seminar was attended by AMA officers, presidents of the historically black colleges and universities, representatives of philanthropic organizations, and U.S. government officials. The results of the seminar was the establishment of the Race Relations Department of the UCBHM at Fisk University, Nashville, Tennessee, in 1942. The Amistad Research Center was established within the Race Relations Department to house the historical records of the American Missionary Association in 1966.

Clifton H. Johnson was appointed as director of the Race Relations Department in 1966, making him the ARC's first administrator. Johnson was a suitable choice for the ARC because of his experience with the AMA archives. He wrote his dissertation on the AMA while a doctoral candidate at the University of North Carolina, organized the AMA archives, and initiated a proposal to the AMA suggesting that they use their archives as a nucleus to collect primary documents on the history of ethnic minorities in the United States. Johnson's initial intent for Amistad Research Center was that it would supply primary resources for scholars interested in any aspect of African American history. The UCBHM eventually closed the Race Relations Department but chose to keep the ARC and it was incorporated into an independent non-profit archive in 1969.

=== Dillard University ===
After incorporation in 1969, the first meeting of the ARC's board members was held in the New York City office of the AMA. Dr. Albert W. Dent, retired president of Dillard University, approached Johnson, with an open invitation from Dr. T. S. Lawless, chairman of the university's board of trustees, about moving the ARC to the campus of Dillard University. In 1970, the ARC moved to Dillard University. The university housed the ARC free of charge in its library with a promise to donate land for the construction of a permanent home on its campus. The funds for a new building at Dillard never crystallized and the center was forced to seek a new location to house its collections that had grown beyond the space it occupied in Dillard's Library.

=== New Orleans Mint ===
The Amistad Research Center moved to the New Orleans Mint in 1980, after its collection became too large for its space at Dillard University. The United States government had given the Old U.S. Mint building to the State of Louisiana, which in turn had given it to the Louisiana State Museum. Johnson reached agreement with the director of the museum about re-locating the ARC to the Old U.S. Mint building. The terms including renting the floor space to the ARC for $1 per year. The ARC spent $500,000 on renovations to the new space, anticipating that the Old U.S. Mint building could accommodate its collections for the next 15 years. Johnson underestimated the growth of the ARC's collections, and after five years the ARC ran out of space again. Johnson and the ARC's Board of Trustees searched for another location that would accommodate the institution in its continued growth.

=== Tulane University ===
By the mid-1980s, the ARC was in need of adequate space and invitations came from various universities to house the ARC. Harvard University, Rutgers University, the University of North Carolina, the University of Georgia, Howard University, Hampton University, the University of Mississippi, Tulane University and Prairie View A&M sent delegations to make presentations to the ARC's board. There was strong opposition to both Mississippi and Tulane housing the Center because of their histories of denying Black students admission to their schools. However, there was strong support from the local community to keep the Center in New Orleans. The local chapter of the Friends of Amistad collected hundreds of signatures from Black residents in favor of Tulane. Rosa Keller, Tulane University President Eamon Kelly, the Tulane University Board of Administrators, and New Orleans Mayor Ernest Morial advocated for the ARC to be located at Tulane University. The board voted to relocate to Tulane University, and the ARC has been on its campus in Uptown New Orleans since 1987. In 1996, Donald DeVore became the first African American to serve as director of the ARC and the third director in its history.

== Holdings ==
=== Archives and manuscripts collection ===
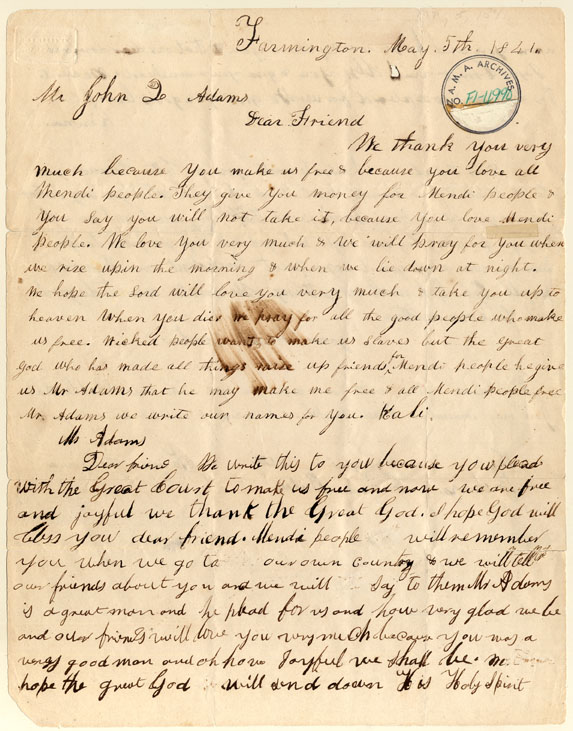
Correspondence from the Amistad captives to John Quincy Adams

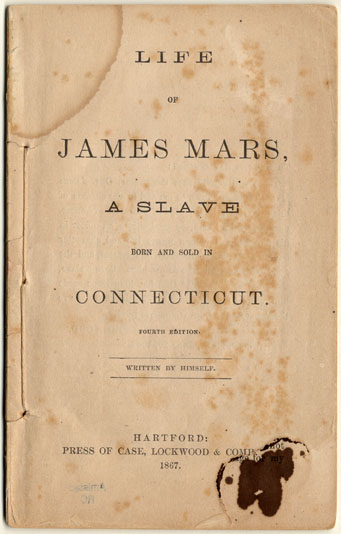
The Slave Narrative of James Mars

The ARC has approximately 800 manuscript collections that document cultural movements, civil rights, race relations, education, politics, and art. It has 250,000 photographs dating from 1860 in various formats including tintypes and glass plate negatives. Microfilm holdings of collections at the ARC and from other repositories total approximately 14,000 reels. The moving image and sound recordings holdings include nearly 8,000 items on video and audiotape, motion picture film, phonographic and optical discs. Featured within the collections are oral histories with civil rights activists, community leaders, artists, and musicians. The center also has archival materials related to W.E.B. DuBois, Mary McLeod Bethune, Langston Hughes, Alain Locke, Zora Neale Hurston, Homer Plessy, Frederick Douglass and Claude McKay.

Archival and manuscript holdings include the papers and records of:

- American Committee on Africa
- American Home Missionary Society
- American Missionary Association
- Larry Bagneris Jr.
- Richmond Barthé
- Carol Brice
- Anne Wiggins Brown
- John Allen Buggs
- Elizabeth Catlett
- Countee Cullen
- Thomas Dent
- Free Southern Theater
- Fannie Lou Hamer
- Chester Himes
- Ellis Marsalis Jr.
- Ernest Morial
- Marc Morial
- John O'Neal
- Operation Crossroads Africa
- A.P. Tureaud
- William Warfield
- Camilla Williams
- Marian Hamilton Spotts
- Hale Woodruff

=== Library collection ===
The ARC's library serves as a complement to the manuscripts collection and serves to document the ethnic experience in the United States by housing pamphlets, broadsides, reports, literary first and notable editions, newspapers and monographs related to its focus. The ARC contains a diverse collection of approximately 45,000 books including rare and first editions, more than 2,000 runs of periodicals dating from 1826, 1.5 million newspaper articles, and 30,000 pamphlets.

In addition to significant holdings in the area of African American literature, Amistad holds works from the personal libraries of authors Countee Cullen, Chester Himes, and Thomas Dent and a Comics and Graphic Novels Collection, in addition to a growing collection of zines. Of significance to the Amistad Case, the ARC's collections include Lewis Tappan's bound volume of contemporary pamphlets on the legal proceedings with his handwritten notes. Other highlights include 18th century slave ordinances in French Louisiana, an edition of Black Majesty by John W. Handercock with an unpublished handwritten poem titled "Black Majesty" by Countee Cullen on the title page verso, and Lewis Tappan's annotated copy of the 1839 edition of American Slavery as It Is: Testimony of a Thousand Witnesses by Theodore Dwight Weld.

=== Art collection ===
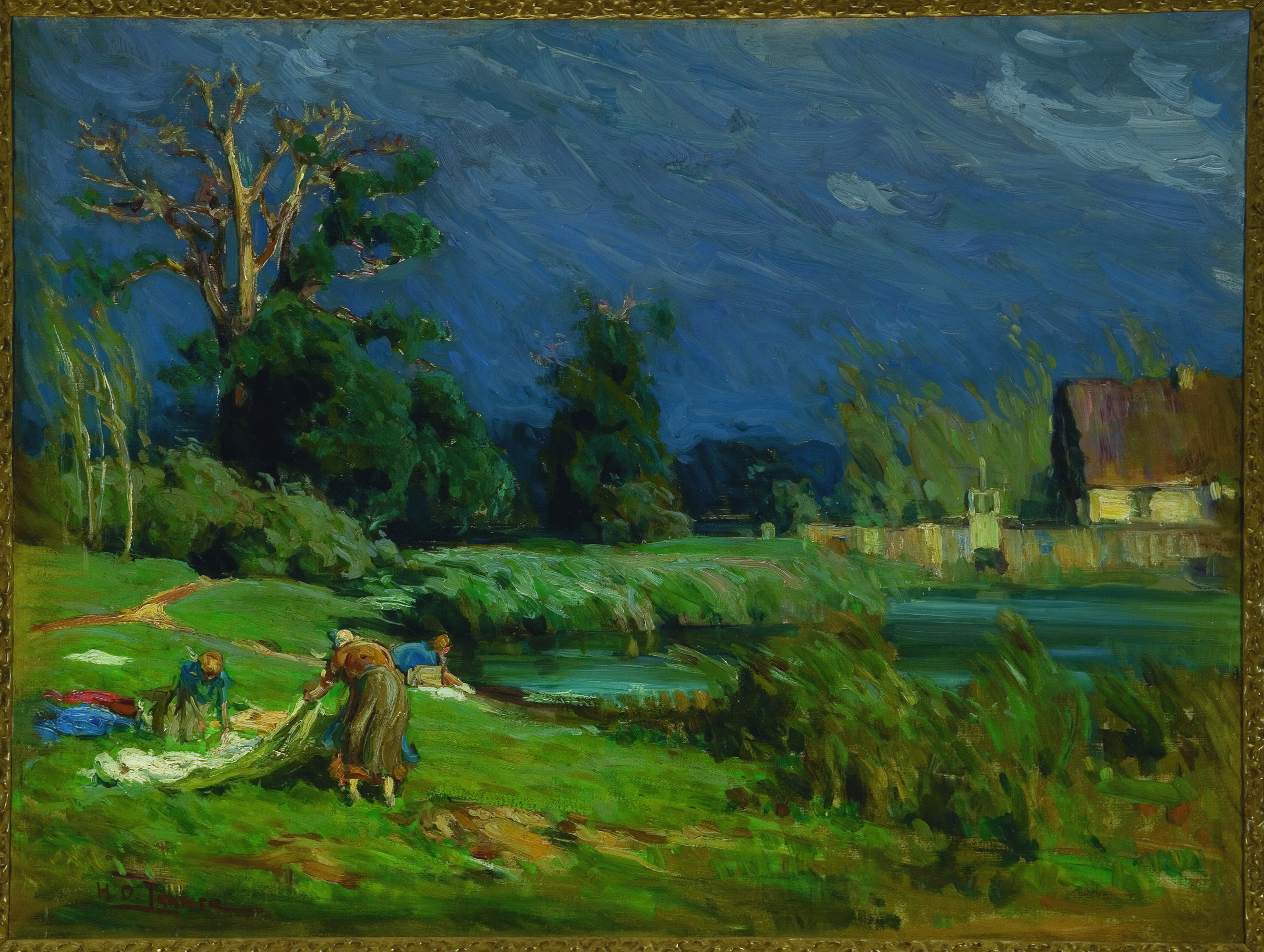
The Laundress, by Henry Ossawa Tanner

The ARC owns a significant collection of African American art consisting of approximately 400 works. Many of the artworks were a part of the collection formed by the William E. Harmon Foundation and include examples from the growing African American visual arts movement of the mid-twentieth century. The works fall within the traditional fine art categories of portraiture, landscape, and genre. Many of these are available in digital form.

Because of space limitations, the ARC's artworks are often displayed at major museums, including the Ogden Museum of Southern Art, the Cleveland Museum of Art, the DuSable Museum of African American History, El Museo del Barrio, and the Perez Art Museum Miami.

Among the prominent works in the collection are the 41 paintings in the Toussaint L'Ouverture series, completed in 1938 by Jacob Lawrence (1917–2000), a celebrated American artist of the 20th century. Toussaint was Lawrence's first series, completed when he was a 21-year-old student. The paintings document the historic events of the Haitian Revolution.

Ellis Wilson's oil painting entitled Funeral Procession is a collection highlight, especially since it was the subject of an episode of a popular television show in the 1980s.

The ARC's art holdings include works from

- Edward Mitchell Bannister
- Richmond Barthé
- Romare Bearden
- Margaret Burroughs
- Elizabeth Catlett
- Claude Clark
- Aaron Douglas
- David Driskell
- William Johnson
- Jacob Lawrence
- Richard Bruce Nugent
- William Edouard Scott
- Henry Ossawa Tanner
- Ellis Wilson
- Hale Woodruff

== See also ==
- Rural African American Museum, Opelousas
