= Clifton H. Johnson =

American historian

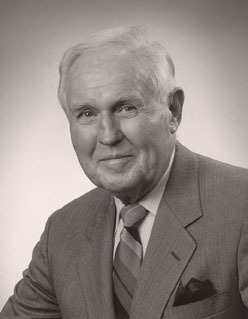
- Born: September 13, 1921; Griffin, Georgia, US
- Died: May 21, 2008 (aged 86); Eugene, Oregon, US
- Resting place: Willamette National Cemetery
- Occupation: Historian
- Organization(s): Amistad Research Center; Founding director
- Known for: Documentation of African-American History

Clifton Herman Johnson (1921–2008) was an American historian noted for founding the Amistad Research Center and for his work on documenting African-American history.

== Early life and education ==
Johnson was born in Griffin, Georgia, on September 13, 1921. He served in the United States Army in World War II. Subsequently, he enrolled in the University of North Carolina where he earned his Bachelor of Arts in 1948. He completed a Master of Arts degree at the University of Chicago in 1949 and ultimately a Doctor of Philosophy (PhD) in American history at the University of North Carolina in 1959. Johnson was an instructor at LeMoyne College while pursuing his PhD.

== Career ==
From 1950 to 1966, Johnson was a history instructor and professor at LeMoyne College, and East Carolina College. He was also an archivist at Fisk University. Later, Johnson was recruited by the American Missionary Association to organize in archival fashion the large collection of documents housed by the American Missionary Association at Fisk University. Johnson was a logical choice for this role since his doctoral dissertation had been on the history of the American Missionary Association. He was for two years on leave of absence from Fisk University for this task. Their collection numbered some 300,000 items at the time, and Johnson further extended their collection in addition to preserving it. By 1963 the collection was sufficiently well organized that Johnson opened it for public use. In 1966, the United Church Board of Homeland Ministries, part of the American Missionary Association, created the Race Relations Department, with Johnson as director. Initially the Race Relations Department provided the financial support for the Amistad Research Center. He continued his work on what would be the Amistad Research Center under the auspices of the Race Relations Department. In 1969, the Amistad Research Center became an independent entity, and it relocated to Dillard University in New Orleans, Louisiana, the following year. Johnson remained director, and he succeeded in continuing to build the collection and the finances of the Amistad Research Center.

Johnson served as director of the Amistad Research Center until 1992, at which time he acquired emeritus status, continuing to publish scholarly articles on African-American History. He additionally served as interim director from May 1995 to May 1996 as the Amistad Research Center recruited a new director. Johnson was a consultant for the Steven Spielberg movie Amistad.

In a publication describing the significance of the Amistad Research Center, Johnson stated:

Traditionally, historians, especially white American historians, have chosen to exclude the positive contributions of African Americans and other ethnic minorities to our history and culture; they have been treated not as actors in history but as part of the historical landscape upon which whites were the history makers. This has often been justified by portraying the minorities as inferior in intelligence and culture. Thus, the writers of history have played an important role in perpetuating racism.

=== Selected publications ===
Johnson's scholarly articles pertained to abolitionism, African-American history and archives administration.

- Clifton H. Johnson, Albert J. Raboteau, editors, God Struck Me Dead: Voices of Ex-Slaves, The Pilgrim Press; Second edition (July 1, 1969), ISBN 0829809457.
- Clifton H. Johnson, "The First Afro-American History", The Crisis, October 1970, pp. 296–299.
- Clifton H. Johnson, "The Amistad Case and Its Consequences in U.S. History", Journal of the New Haven Colony Historical Society, Spring 1990.
- Clifton H. Johnson, "Critics of Yale Slavery Report Wrong", Yale News, January 25, 2002.

== Personal life ==
Johnson was married to Rosemary Johnson with whom he had sons Charles Johnson and Robert Johnson and daughter Virginia Johnson. He resided in Eastern New Orleans for the majority of his tenure as director of the Amistad Research Center. He died at his home in Eugene, Oregon, on May 21, 2008.
