= Albert W. Dent =

Academic leader and community leader in New Orleans, Louisiana USA

- Born: September 25, 1904; Atlanta, Georgia, U.S.
- Died: February 13, 1984 (aged 79); New Orleans, Louisiana, U.S.
- Occupations: University administrator Hospital administrator
- Known for: Community leader Education and health care for African-Americans

Albert Walter Dent (September 25, 1904 – February 13, 1984) was an academic administrator who served initially as business administrator of Flint-Goodridge Hospital and later as president of Dillard University (1941–1969), a predominantly black liberal arts college in New Orleans, Louisiana. In these roles, he was a community leader who improved education and health care for African-Americans and impoverished people in the American South.

== Early life and education ==
Dent was born on September 25, 1904, in Atlanta, Georgia, of African-American heritage. His father was a day laborer who died shortly before Albert's birth. His mother worked as a domestic servant to support Albert and his two sisters. The Dents had a family friend who mentored young Albert, important in a fatherless family.

In 1926 Dent graduated from Morehouse College in Atlanta with a degree in accounting. While matriculating at Morehouse College, Dent was extensively involved in campus activities and student affairs while also working at the Atlanta Life Insurance Company. Upon graduation, Dent took a job as branch office auditor for the Atlanta Life Insurance Company.

Shortly thereafter, Dent became vice president of the Safety Construction Company in Houston, Texas, where he worked for four years. However, he was subsequently recruited by John Hope, then president of Morehouse College, to return to Atlanta to serve in fundraising and alumni relations roles at the college. During his tenure at Morehouse College, Dent met Will W. Alexander who was serving as acting president of Dillard University in New Orleans. Dillard University already had a relationship with Flint-Goodridge Hospital in New Orleans, and financial backers of both Dillard University and Flint-Goodridge Hospital were constructing a new campus and hospital building in 1932. Flint-Goodridge Hospital hired Dent to be superintendent of the new, well-equipped hospital facility, which Dent accepted despite the hardship created by the $700 annual pay-cut that the position entailed. During this time of Jim Crow Laws in the Southern United States, this hospital and its administration were particularly important to African-Americans in southeast Louisiana.

== Career ==
=== Leadership at Flint-Goodridge Hospital ===
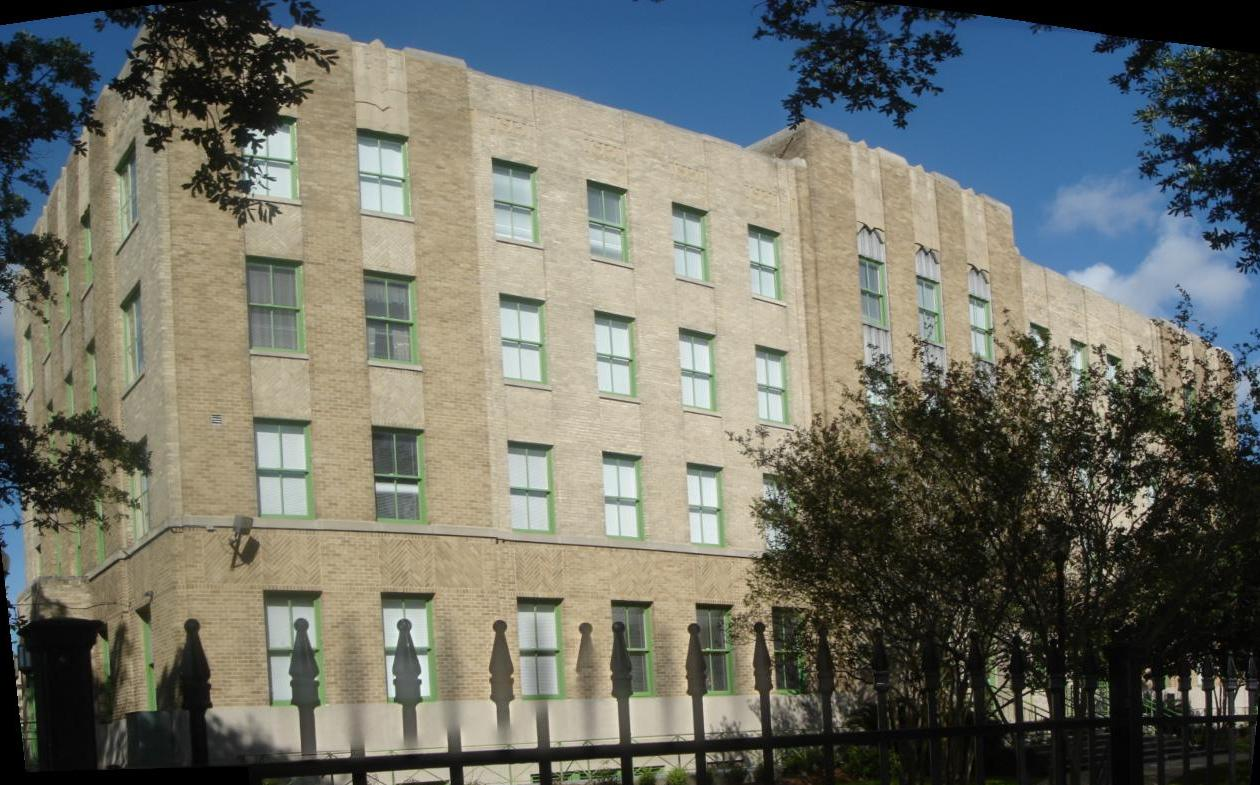
Flint Goodridge Hospital of Dillard University

In 1935 Dent assumed the dual role of business manager and superintendent of Flint-Goodridge Hospital, effectively making him the hospital's chief executive, a role he fulfilled until 1941. As part of preparing Dent for these responsibilities, Alexander arranged for Dent to work for a two-month period at nearby Touro Infirmary Hospital. During Dent's tenure as executive at Flint-Goodridge, the hospital significantly improved patient care and education for health care providers. He also significantly influenced quality of health care in the local community and beyond. Additionally he led successful fund-raising efforts for the hospital. Early in his term at Flint-Goodridge Hospital, Dent cultivated a close working relationship with New Orleans businessman and philanthropist Edgar B. Stern. Stern was an influential member of the Board of Trustees for both Flint-Goodridge Hospital and Dillard University, since the two institutions had shared governance. The relationship was useful to Dent in his fundraising efforts, since hospitals and universities for African-Americans were chronically short of money at the time of the Jim Crow South. His fund-raising success included such institutions as the Rosenwald Fund and the General Education Board, in addition to the United States Public Health Service.

Dent used funds that he raised to provide advanced training for physicians at the hospital of African-American ethnicity, including training at major medical centers in East Coast of the United States and in Europe. As a result, with time, all of the Department Heads at the hospital were physicians of African-American ethnicity. The hospital maintained a residency training program for physicians, and, with the improvements in equipment and in quality of the staff, the hospital was approved for residency training by the American College of Surgeons and by the American Medical Association. By 1937, twenty physicians had completed post-graduate training at Flint-Goodridge Hospital. Additionally, as hospital superintendent, Dent developed summer programs for the continuing education of African-American physicians in the region. These involved training at other New Orleans area hospitals and medical schools. Outreach of these programs extended to fifty-seven communities. Edgar B. Stern personally financed much of the cost of the summer programs.

Hospital superintendent Dent also developed health outreach programs for the local African-American community to address their high rates of morbidity and mortality. He established pre-natal health care plans, to provide pre-natal care and the cost of delivery for a premium of 50 cents per week for the duration of the pregnancy. Dent established "Mother's Clubs" to encourage good pre-natal and post-natal care, and the clubs included a social worker whose salary was paid by Edgar B. Stern. in 1935, Dent established a well baby clinic. Additionally the hospital during this time established a six-month training program in midwifery.

Beginning in 1936 at Dent's direction, the hospital offered the "Penny-A-Day" hospitalization insurance plan. For an annual premium of $3.65, the insured was guaranteed up to 21 days of hospitalization each year. The plan was heavily subscribed, and it served as a prototype for low-coast health insurance for African-Americans at the time. It was eventually replaced in 1943 with an insurance plan offered by the city of New Orleans.

Dent addressed tuberculosis and syphilis, diseases that were endemic in New Orleans at the time. He established a weekly seminar series on these diseases for local African-American physicians who, in turn, agreed to test patients for the diseases. Dent arranged for funding for the tests and for subsequent treatment of the patients if the tests proved positive. In 1933, through an agreement that Dent arranged, the American Social Hygiene Association and the United States Public Health Service provided staffing at the hospital for clinical work on these diseases. For social workers and public health nurses as well as the general public, Dent developed a lecture series on venereal diseases. The National Medical Association recognized Flint-Gooddridge Hospital as being a leader in public education on these diseases.

=== Leadership at Dillard University ===
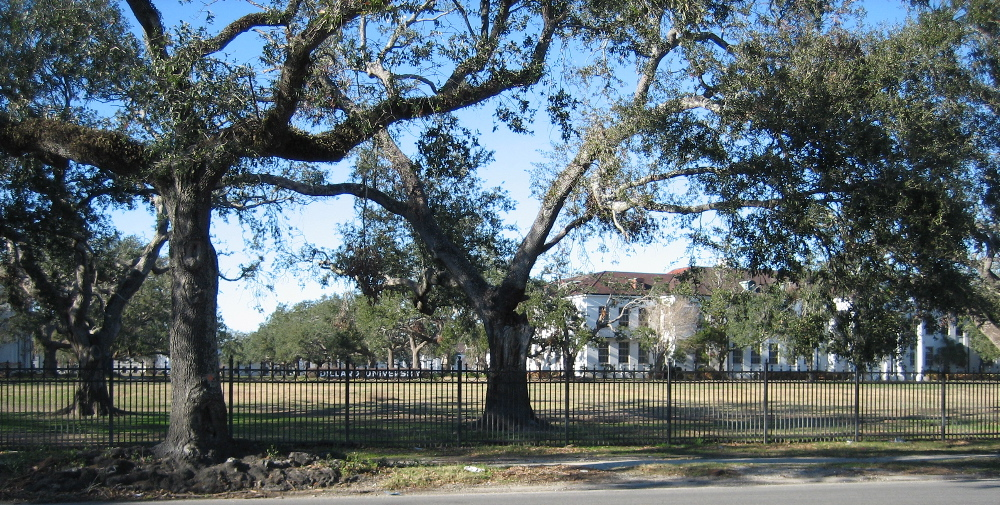
Dillard University campus as seen from Gentilly Road in New Orleans

Dent was named president of Dillard University on May 31, 1941, a selection resulting from his success at Flint-Goodridge Hospital and from the shared governance of Dillard University and the hospital. Dent's appointment initiated a period of significant advancement of Dillard University. Under his leadership, the university improved its standards for faculty and increased its academic offerings, including establishment of a college nursing program, the first nationally accredited college nursing program in Louisiana. As at Flint-Goodridge Hospital, Dent raised funds to significantly enlarge Dillard University's financial endowment which continued to grow, and he accomplished the fundraising in part by developing relationships with philanthropic organizations. Dent applied some of these funds for building improvements and new buildings on the university's campus. Buildings constructed during Dent's term included the science building, the chapel, the library, and the physical education building, in addition to others that were renovated or enlarged. Enrollment grew from about 300 students in 1941 to more than 1100 students in 1969.

In the 1950s, Dent organized the Edwin R. Embree Memorial Lecture series at Dillard University, which he created to further the university's commitment to public discourse. Noted speakers included: Eleanor Roosevelt, Thurgood Marshall, Mary McLeod Bethune, Martin Luther King Jr., Roy Wilkins, and Jackie Robinson. These were later known as the Dillard Presidential Lecture Series.

A member of Omega Psi Phi fraternity, Dent was instrumental in forming the fraternity's Theta Sigma Chapter at Dillard in May 1936. He served as the organization's 16th Grand Basileus from 1937 to 1940.

=== National and community involvement ===
Dent acquired a reputation for fund-raising, and he had cultivated relationships with philanthropists. For this reason, he participated in the committee that formed the United Negro College Fund in 1944 and subsequently served as the fund's chairmanchairman, from 1965 to 1970. Additionally he served as president of the Southern Association of Colleges and Secondary Schools for Negroes in 1948.

Dent's board memberships included the National Merit Scholarship Program, the Committee on Faculty Fellowships of the Ford Fund for the Advancement of Education, and the American Council of Education. He served in advisory capacities for the Research Advisory Council of the U.S. Office of Education and for the Danforth Teacher Study Grants, in addition to being a trustee for Meharry Medical College. His local board memberships included the United Fund, the Delgado Art Museum, the YMCA, the New Orleans Council of Social Agencies, the Red Cross, the Boy Scouts, and Flint-Goodridge Hospital. On retirement from Dillard University, Dent maintained his community involvement, continuing his board memberships and new ones, including the Louisiana Board of Regents of Higher Education, the New Orleans Sewerage and Water Board, and the New Orleans Times-Picayune Publishing Corporation, and he consulted for the Health Education Authority of Louisiana.

=== Influence on race relations ===
Dent crossed racial boundaries to make steady progress on causes that mattered to him. It was written that his imposing demeanor combined with a soft-spoken style commanded attention regardless of ethnicity. Dent interacted with people of different races and economic backgrounds equally. Dent, working with Edgar B. Stern, developed strong working relationships with leading physicians in New Orleans, critical to advancing Dent's cause at Flint-Goodridge Hospital. This was part of his style in which he influenced people regardless of race or socio-economic status. Although he participated in the March on Washington in 1963, he otherwise did not participate in sit-ins or pickets and instead provided influence on racial matters.

Dent was president of the New Orleans CItizens Committee on Race Relations, vice-president of the Louisiana Advisory Committee to the United States Civil Rights Commission, and a member of the board of directors of the Commission on Interracial Cooperation.

=== Awards and honors ===
For his accomplishments at Flint-Goodridge Hospital and for actively promoting better health standards more generally, Dent was the first African-American to be named a Fellow of the American College of Hospital Administrators. Dillard University awarded Dent the honorary degree of Doctor of Humane Letters, only the second honorary award given by the university. His other honorary degrees were from Morehouse College, Bishop College, and Tulane University, as well as honorary membership in Phi Beta Kappa. Dent was also the 1976 winner of the New Orleans Times-Picayune Loving Cup award, and he was the first African-American to receive this award. The award ceremony was conducted in the chapel at Dillard University on the occasion of Dent's birthday. Dent Hall on the campus of Dillard University is named in his honor.

The Foundation of the American College of Healthcare Executives maintains the Albert W. Dent Graduate Student Scholarship, to promote graduate studies of minority students in the field of health care management.

Dent also received the Whitney Young Brotherhood Award, the Weiss Brotherhood Award from the National Conference of Christians and Jews, and the Silver Beaver Award of the Boy Scouts.

The Amistad Research Center maintains a collection of papers, the "Albert and Jessie Dent Papers", documenting approximately 100 years of family and civil rights history.

== Personal life ==
In 1927 Albert W. Dent married Ernestine Jessie Covington Dent, a concert pianist. Their first born child was poet and writer Thomas Dent. Their other children were Benjamin Albert Dent and Walter Jesse Dent.

Dent died in his New Orleans home on February 13, 1984. At the time of his death, he and his wife had two grandchildren in addition to the three sons. Memorial services were held for Dent at the chapel on the campus of Dillard University.

=== Ernestine Jessie Covington Dent ===
Dent's wife Ernestine Jessie Covington Dent (née Ernestine Jessie Covington) was notable in her own right. She was born in 1904 to a prominent African-American family in Houston, Texas. Her father was physician Benjamin Jesse Covington and her mother was Jennie Belle Covington (née Murphy), and she was their only child. Known to friends and family as Jessie, she graduated from the Oberlin Conservatory of Music and subsequently attended the Juilliard Graduate School of Music, on a fellowship from 1924 to 1928. During this time, she studied with noted pianist Olga Samaroff. While at Juilliard, Jessie Dent organized the first African-American choir to sing at the Southern Baptist Convention. For a brief time, Jessie Dent taught private piano lessons in Houston after completing her studies at Juilliard.

Although she gave up her musical career to be a wife and mother, Jessie Dent continued to perform at occasional concerts, including ones at Spelman College and various venues in Texas, North Carolina and South Carolina. She also maintained personal relationships with several African-American musicians of the time, most notably Marian Anderson. During this time, she served on the board of directors of the New Orleans Philharmonic Symphony. Jessie Dent was also a member of the B-Sharp Music Club of New Orleans, the Dillard University Women's Club, and the Women's Auxiliary at Flint-Goodridge Hospital. In her work with the Women's Auxiliary, she helped create the Ebony Fashion Fair, a fashion show primarily for African-Americans which helped support Flint-Goodridge Hospital in the early days of the fair. The fair came into being through a contact that Jessie Dent had with John H. Johnson of Johnson Publishing Co. in 1956 about organizing a fashion show to benefit the Women's Auxiliary. The success of this initial show lead to the formation of the Ebony Fashion Fair.

Jessie Covington Dent was a charter member of the New Orleans Alumnae Chapter, formerly the Alpha Eta Sigma chapter, of Delta Sigma Theta. Chartered in June 1936, it was the second alumnae chapter in the state of Louisiana and Mrs. Dent served as its second president. Mrs. Dent was also instrumental in establishing the sorority's Beta Gamma Chapter at Dillard University in 1937 and the Gamma Alpha Chapter at Xavier University of Louisiana in 1940.

Jessie Dent died in New Orleans in 2001 at age 96.

Dillard University awards the Jessie Covington Dent Memorial Scholarship in Music.
