= Thomas Dent (writer) =

American poet (1932–1998)

Thomas Covington Dent
- Born: March 20, 1932; New Orleans, Louisiana, U.S.
- Died: June 6, 1998 (aged 66)
- Education: Morehouse College (BA, Political Science) Syracuse University (Graduate Studies in Political Science) Goddard College (MFA)
- Known for: Work in the Civil Rights Movement as well as literary works
- Parents: Albert W. Dent (father); Ernestine Jessie Covington Dent (mother)

Thomas Covington Dent (March 20, 1932 – June 6, 1998) was an African-American poet and writer. Dent came from a prominent and socially aware family. Due to this, he was able to receive multiple levels of education at differing institutions. He attended college at Morehouse College and served as editor-in-chief of the college newspaper, The Maroon Tiger. Upon graduation, Dent enrolled in graduate studies at Syracuse University, before joining the army for a two-year stint. He then moved to New York and worked towards the advancement of civil rights. Later, he returned home to New Orleans and began cultivating and mentoring young African-American writers.

== Early life and education ==
Thomas Dent was born on March 20, 1932, in New Orleans, Louisiana, to Albert W. Dent, president of Dillard University, and Ernestine Jessie Covington Dent, a concert pianist. He was the oldest of three sons.

Although his mother and father were prominent societal members, they were not the only members of his family who were influential in the African-American community. His grandfather, Dr. Jesse Covington, worked extensively in the Negro Business League to promote the economic venues and advancements for African Americans. He also did work in the medical field and helped build the first medical center for African Americans in Houston, the Riverside General Hospital.

His grandmother, Belle Covington, is recognized for her efforts to prompt interracial relations. Furthermore, she was instrumental in the creation of the Blue Triangle YWCA. Through this organization, Belle was able to develop social programs to support the African-American community as well as advocate against white mob violence. On top of these achievements, she also advocated heavily for Dent's education and schooling. Dent's upbringing in this prominent African-American family allowed for him to be educated at both private and public schools. Ultimately, he graduated from a Black college preparatory school in New Orleans, Gilbert Academy, in 1947.

== Collegiate career ==
After graduating from Gilbert Academy in 1947, Dent decided not to attend Dillard University where his father was president, and instead chose to attend Morehouse College in Atlanta. Coming from such a prominent family, Dent was socially reflective and aware of the situations around him. His choice to attend Morehouse was a direct consequence of his efforts at cultivating his strengths to benefit his future work in the civil rights movement.

While at Morehouse, Dent worked with the school's newspaper, The Maroon Tiger, and during his senior year became the editor-in-chief. Early on during his tenure as editor-in-chief, it was evident that his social awareness allowed him to see reality for what it truly was and showcased his understanding of a complex system of playfulness. He was able to dabble into the larger issues at hand, while also keeping the playful tone that became a prominent element in his later writings.

Some of the editorials that Dent produced while working with The Maroon Tiger include "Who Is To Blame? For Fixes and Scandals", "Danger! For Students in Philosophy Only", "Younger Generation Sad Representative of American Youth", "When Professors Object We Must Always Yield", and "The Summing Up and Moving On". Each of these editorials focused on a different issue that was present in society. For example, in "Who Is To Blame? For Fixes and Scandals", Dent discussed the expulsion of 90 West Point cadets for cheating in exams. He touched upon the idea that these athletes were not solely to blame for their academic misconduct. The blame should instead be place on the institutions that promote athletic ability over academic honesty and prowess. In "Danger! For Students in Philosophy Only", Dent switches gear to discuss how dangerous it is to ask certain question in a campus class taught by Sam Williams. In Dent's major editorial, "Younger Generation Sad Representative of American Youth", he agreed with a Time magazine article that his generation was complacent and had a large sense of apathy. He argues this is a bad thing because his generation makes no attempt to leave behind the confusion of the times. In "When Professors Object We Must Always Yield", he made light of Professor N. P. Tillman and his anger over lines from Tillman's poem being quoted without citation in a 1917 edition of The Maroon Tiger. In Dent's last editorial, "The Summing Up and Moving On", he called for more support across the entire college for extracurricular activities. He also argued that "education is a broad process, and that by refusing to cooperate with other activities that students are interested in beside their assignments they [the faculty] are failing to fully educate."

== Later life and death ==
Upon graduating from Morehouse College with a Bachelor of Arts degree in Political Science, Dent decided to continue his education in Political Science at Syracuse University, taking a special interest in International Relations. He attended Syracuse from 1952 to 1956 before decided to join the U.S. Army for a short two-year stint from 1957 to 1959. While in the U.S. Army, Dent served as a Private First Class at the Ireland Army Hospital in Fort Knox, Kentucky. Dent also participated in a Writer's Digest story through the mail during this time.

After two years in the Army, Dent decided to discontinue his studies at Syracuse and moved to New York. Not long after he arrived in New York, he became involved in the political activities and literary elements that coincided to the emergence of Black Nationalism. From 1959 to 1960, he worked as a reporter with The New York Age. After a year serving in this position, he began working as a social worker in the New York Welfare Department. Thurgood Marshall then appointed Dent as the press liaison for the National Association for the Advancement of Colored People (NAACP) in 1960. This was a position Dent served in for three years up until 1963. Through this position, Dent was able to travel the Southeast and work hands-on in the Civil Rights movement. This traveling throughout the Southeast allowed him to provide help in attempts at getting James Meredith admitted as the first Black student at the University of Mississippi.

After James Meredith was successfully admitted to the University of Mississippi, Dent continued his activism work. With the help of others in the community of Harlem, Dent helped to produce a journal titled On Guard for Freedom. This journal was a Black nationalists literary organization that included the likes of LeRoi Jones (Amiri Baraka), Harold Cruse, and Calvin Hicks. This community in Harlem inspired Dent and he began meeting with other African-American poets including Calvin Hernton and David Henderson to discuss the formation of poetry workshops. The more they discussed this idea, the more poets joined, wanting to offer their assistance. In 1962, along with the help of other poets, Dent founded the Umbra Writers' Workshop. This was a very influential workshop that focused on poetry and the arts, while also publishing literary works such as the Umbra Magazine in 1963. This organization took a special focus on political activism and the advancement of the African-American people. In this workshop, Dent helped mentor younger African-American poets, including Ishmael Reed, who attributed much of his writing style to Dent. The organization eventually disbanded in 1964 after many disagreements over the true purpose of the workshop.

In 1965, after the disbandment of the Umbra Writers' Workshop, Dent returned home to New Orleans. This trip was originally intended to only be a visit, but found the change that had taken place in New Orleans since his departure to be fascinating. One of the main elements that kept Dent in New Orleans was the Free Southern Theater (FST). The FST was a theater group that was closely allied with the civil rights movement. In 1966, Dent became the associate director, and he held this position until 1970. While associate director, Dent produced many different plays that were showcased through the FST.

Also during his tenure as associate director, Dent established the FST Writers' Workshop, also known as BLKARTSOUTH. This was a mentorship program through which Dent worked towards cultivating the artistic skills and literary devices of the young writers around him including Kalamu ya Salaam. In 1973, Dent transitioned and formed a new mentorship program titled the Congo Square Writers Union in which he worked to bolster the young authors around him. Members of this Union included Chakula cha Jua, Tommy Watson, Quo Breaux, and many others. Dent offered extensive help to the individuals in this Union by introducing them to writers such as Edward Kamau Brathwaite, Keorapetse Kgositsile, Niyi Osundare, and Al Young.

In the mid- to late 1970s, Dent transitioned to a new type of work. He began working to document events that occurred through oral history projects. He was issued several grants for his work including a grant to conduct oral history projects of Mississippi civil rights workers from 1978 to 1985. Dent continued this creativity on into the 1980s, producing many literary works during this time. He developed numerous literary works including screenplays, poetry books, journals, and notebooks. Dent was then named executive director of the New Orleans Jazz & Heritage Foundation from 1987 to 1990. He continued his oral history projects into the 1990s and conducted more than a hundred interviews towards the end of his life.

Dent died on June 6, 1998, at the age of 66 in New Orleans.

== Literary works ==
- Magnolia Street (1976)
- Blue Lights and River Songs (1982)
- Southern Journey: A Return to the Civil Rights Movement (1997)
- Negro Study No. 34A (1970)
- Riot Duty (1970)
- Snapshot (1970)
- Features and Stuff (1970)
- Ritual Murder (1976)
