= Evangeline Made: A Tribute to Cajun Music =

Studio album by Various Artists
- Released: March 5, 2002
- Genre: Cajun, Zydeco
- Length: 44:06
- Label: Vanguard
- Producer: Ann Savoy

Evangeline Made: A Tribute to Cajun Music is an album of Cajun music released in 2002. It reached number 6 on the Billboard Top World Music chart and was nominated for Best Traditional Folk Album at the 45th Grammy Awards.

== History ==
Producer Ann Savoy's goal for Evangeline Made was to demonstrate the affection of popular artists for Cajun music, and to "renew and extend Cajun tradition rather than simply re-create it".

Each song is sung in French even though most of the artists do not speak the language. Savoy later reunited with Ronstadt to record the 2006 album Adieu False Heart, which would be Ronstadt's final album before her retirement.

== Reception ==
Professional ratings
Review scores
Source	Rating
AllMusic	4/5 stars
No Depression	(Favorable)

Music critic Richie Unterberger, writing for AllMusic, gave the album 4 of 5 stars, writing: "The production is understated and sympathetic, as it's neither hardcore Cajun music nor Cajun music that's been bleached into pop… Purists might find this something of a sellout, a dilution of the real and rawer thing for ears unaccustomed to the real deal. Perhaps they have viable points, but here's a fact which might be hard for them to face: this simply has much more variety, skillful singing, and thoughtful, pleasing production than most Cajun records do, without compromising the spirit of the music."

Writing for No Depression, Don McLeese called the album "musical interplay so soulful and vibrant it transcends the language barrier." and avers the collection "honors the music not as a folk purist’s artifact, but as a living dynamic. Not one of the fourteen cuts seems less than a labor of love"

Music critic Mike Warren reviewed the album for The Pitch and of the songs, wrote, "Because they're in French, and because they're sexy as hell, the songs have an air of sultry mystery that's part of the best Cajun music."

== Track listing ==
1. An All-Star Band Of Cajun Musicians – "Vagabond Special"
2. Ann Savoy & Linda Ronstadt – "La Chanson D'Une Fille De Quinze Ans (Song of a Fifteen Year Old Girl)"
3. John Fogerty – "Diggy Liggy Lo"
4. Linda Thompson – "Je Veux Plus Te Voir (I Don't Want You Anymore)"
5. Patty Griffin – "Pa Janvier, Laisse Moi M'En Aller (Pa Janvier, Let Me Go)"
6. Richard Thompson – "Les Flammes d'Enfer (The Flames of Hell)"
7. David Johansen – "Ma Mule (My Mule)"
8. Maria McKee – "Ma Blonde Est Partie (My Blonde Left)"
9. Rodney Crowell – "Blues de Bosco (Bosco Blues)"
10. Ann Savoy & Linda Ronstadt – "O, Ma Chère 'Tite Fille (Oh, My Dear Little Girl)"
11. Linda Thompson – "Valse de Balfa (Balfa Waltz)"
12. An All-Star Band Of Cajun Musicians – "Two Step de Prairie Soileau"
13. Nick Lowe – "Arrêtte Pas la Musique (Don't Stop the Music)"
14. Maria McKee – "Tout un Beau Soir en Me Promenant (On a Beautiful Evening While ...)"

== Personnel ==
- Guitar: Christine Balfa, Sam Broussard, David Doucet, Steve Riley, Jane Vidrine
- Steel Guitar: Brian Koonin, Rodney Miller. Slide Guitar: Sonny Landreth
- Bass: Blaine Gaspard, Dirk Powell, Mitch Reed
- Piano: David Egan, Wilson Savoy
- Accordion: Jimmy Breaux, Steve Riley, Marc Savoy
- Fiddle: Michael Doucet, Stephan Galdi, David Greely, Andrew *Nicodema, Steve Riley, Kevin Wimmer
- Drums: Austin Broussard, Mike Burch, Kevin Dugas
- Percussion: Christine Balfa, Kevin Dugas, Brian Koonin, Dirk Powell
