= Bayou Ruler =

Studio album by Steve Riley and the Mamou Playboys
- Released: 1998
- Genre: Cajun
- Label: Rounder
- Producer: C.C. Adcock, Tarka Cordell

Steve Riley and the Mamou Playboys chronology
Friday at Last (1997)	Bayou Ruler (1998)	Happytown (2001)

Bayou Ruler is an album by the American band Steve Riley and the Mamou Playboys, released in 1998. A couple of its English-language songs were regional hits, although they proved controversial to some Cajun traditionalists. The band supported the album with a North American tour. "Let Me Know" was promoted to radio stations all over the United States, a rarity for a Cajun single.

== Production ==
The album was produced by C.C. Adcock and Tarka Cordell. The band continued to incorporate into their sound rock and blues styles; in their spare time the band listened more to rock than Louisiana music. "Mama Told Papa" is a cover of the Clifton Chenier song. "My True Love (Voyage d'amour)" is a cover of the Dewey Balfa tune; "je suis pas un couillon" is a cover of the Belton Richard song. Jimmy Domengeaux played guitar on the album, his last with the band; he died in a motorcycle accident in January 1999.

== Critical reception ==
Professional ratings
Review scores
Source	Rating
AllMusic	4/5 stars
MusicHound World: The Essential Album Guide	4/5 stars

The Los Angeles Times called Bayou Ruler "a scattered-sounding, misdirected album that Riley describes as 'swamp pop'... Its layers of brass, electric guitar, pedal steel guitar, Hammond B3 organ and other pop-friendly devices are murky indeed." The Star Tribune opined that "'Tough Get Going' is a particularly anemic rocker, and the swamp pop stuff just needs to be greasier."

The Washington Post praised the "convincing" Cajun-rock fusion, writing that "one has to go back to the swamp-pop glory days of Tommy McClain and Cleveland Crochet to find such a convincing hybrid." The Province determined that the title track possessed a "Foreigner-goes-Cajun sound." The Albuquerque Journal noted that the album "expands the group's horizons with a mixture of rock 'n' roll, R&B, and zydeco."

AllMusic wrote that the band, "purveyors of traditional Cajun music, range far out of the bayous to incorporate most all the musical styles of Southern Louisiana."

== Track listing ==
No.	Title	Length
1.	"Bayou Ruler"
2.	"Laisse-moi connaître"
3.	"My True Love (Voyage d'amour)"
4.	"Tough Get Going"
5.	"King Zydeco"
6.	"La rosée"
7.	"All for the Better"
8.	"j'ai été-z-au bal"
9.	"Chez personne"
10.	"Clin d'oeil (The Wink)"
11.	"je suis pas un couillon"
12.	"Mama Told Papa"
13.	"Let Me Know"
