= If Dreams Come True =

Studio album by Ann Savoy
- Released: May 15, 2007
- Studio: Studio Savoy Faire, Eunice, LA
- Genre: Traditional Pop Standards, jazz
- Length: 45:36
- Label: Memphis Records
- Producer: Ann Savoy, Joel Savoy, The Sleepless Knights

Ann Savoy chronology
Adieu False Heart (2006)	If Dreams Come True (2007)	Black Coffee (2010)

If Dreams Come True is an album by American singer and musician Ann Savoy, released in 2007.

== History ==
Prior to recording her first solo album, Savoy performed professionally for many years with her husband accordionist Marc Savoy and fiddler Michael Doucet in the Savoy Doucet Cajun Band, an all-woman band The Magnolia Sisters and with the Savoy Family Band. As The Zozo Sisters, she recorded the Grammy Award nominated album Adieu False Heart with Linda Ronstadt.

If Dreams Come True is credited to Ann Savoy & Her Sleepless Knights. It includes blues and jazz standards Savoy listened to as a child in Richmond, Virginia. She was encouraged to record the album by her musician/producer son Joel Savoy. In an interview, Savoy commented, “A lot of the reviewers think it’s a Cajun record. I’ve made Cajun records, but this is another kind of music.” The album was recorded on analog tape at Joel Savoy's Studio Savoy Faire. His brother Wilson and several members of the Red Stick Ramblers also played on the album as the "Sleepless Knights".

== Reception ==
Professional ratings
Review scores
Source	Rating
Allmusic	3.5/5 stars
No Depression	(Favorable)

Music critic Michael Berick, writing for Allmusic, praised selected tracks, writing that overall "Sometimes the performances do suggest an excellent lounge band to the extent that you can almost hear the audience applause after a solo. Still, If Dreams Come True offers a delightful, charming musical excursion of Paris' romantic Left Bank." Critic Tom Wilk called the album "a well-executed set of jazz-tinged standards that demonstrates her versatility as a vocalist." and noted the "all-acoustic setting provides a vibrant, intimate backdrop for the songs."

== Track listing ==
No.	Title	Writer(s)	Length
1.	"If Dreams Come True"	Benny Goodman, Irving Mills, Edgar Sampson	3:45
2.	"The Very Thought of You"	Ray Noble	4:24
3.	"Melodie au Crepuscule"	Django Reinhardt	2:59
4.	"Getting Some Fun out of Life"	Joe Burke, Edgar Leslie	3:32
5.	"If You Don't I Know Who Will"	Clarence Williams, Bessie Smith, Tim Brymn	4:20
6.	"Ces Petites Choses"	Holt Marvell, Jack Strachey	3:56
7.	"Bewitched, Bothered and Bewildered"	Lorenz Hart, Richard Rodgers	4:44
8.	"If Your Kisses Can't Hold the Man You Love"	Vivian Ellis, Jack Yellen	4:08
9.	"It's Like Reaching for the Moon"	A. J. Lewis, Gerald Marqussee, Al Sherman	4:37
10.	"Si Tu Savais"	Georges Ulmer	4:50
11.	"The Way You Look Tonight"	Dorothy Fields, Jerome Kern	4:21

== Personnel ==
- Ann Savoy – vocals
- Glenn Fields – drums
- Eric Frey – upright bass
- Joel Savoy – guitar, fiddle
- Chas Justus – guitar
- Tom Mitchell Jr. – guitar
- Wilson Savoy – piano
- Kevin Wimmer – fiddle

Production notes:

- Ann Savoy – producer, mixing
- Joel Savoy – producer
- Sleepless Knights – producer
- Tom Mitchell Jr. – mixing
- Brad Blackwood – mastering
- Jillian Johnson – photography
- Brooke Barnett – cover design
