= Adieu False Heart =

Studio album by Linda Ronstadt with Ann Savoy
- Released: July 25, 2006
- Recorded: 2006
- Studio: Dirk Powell’s Cypress House Studio (Breaux Bridge, Louisiana): Minutia Studios (Nashville, Tennessee); The Plant Studios (Sausalito, California)
- Genre: Folk rock, Cajun, acoustic
- Length: 42:57
- Label: Vanguard
- Producer: Steve Buckingham

Linda Ronstadt chronology
Hummin' to Myself (2004)	Adieu False Heart (2006)	Duets (2014)

Professional ratings
Review scores
Source	Rating
Acoustic Music	4.5/5 stars
AllMusic	4/5 stars
PopMatters	4.5/5 stars

Adieu False Heart is a collaborative album by American singer, songwriter, and producer Linda Ronstadt featuring Cajun music singer Ann Savoy. It peaked at #146 on the Billboard album chart and nominated at the 2006 Grammy Awards for Best Traditional Folk Album and Best Engineered Album, Non-Classical. This was Ronstadt's final studio album before her retirement in 2011 and the revelation of her affliction with Parkinson's disease (later revealed to actually be progressive supranuclear palsy) in 2013, leaving her unable to perform or sing.

== Production ==
Ronstadt, a soprano, and Savoy, an alto, had previously recorded duets for the Savoy-produced album Evangeline Made: A Tribute to Cajun Music; here, they sing together as The Zozo Sisters on the album, which brings together a mixture of Louisiana Cajun sounds, popular music of the 20th century, and folk/rock classics. The album includes an interpretation of The Left Banke's 1966 hit "Walk Away Renée", Harry Belafonte's 1950s hit by John Jacob Niles "Go Away From My Window" and the French classic "Parlez-Moi D'Amour". Ronstadt takes lead on Julie Miller's "I Can't Get Over You," with Julie's husband Buddy Miller on guitar and Savoy takes lead on Richard Thompson's "Burns' Supper."

On her collaboration with Savoy, Ronstadt remarked: "We could have made a quilt, I guess, except we're musicians, so we're making a record together instead. She sings in French — I don't speak French — but there's traditional love in this bond."

The album was recorded at Dirk Powell’s Cypress House Studio in Louisiana. It features local musicians, including Chas Justus, Eric Frey and Kevin Wimmer of the Red Stick Ramblers, Sam Broussard of The Mamou Playboys, Dirk Powell and Joel Savoy, as well as Nashville performers, like fiddler Stuart Duncan, mandolinist Sam Bush and guitarist Bryan Sutton.

== Critical response and accolades ==
The Ronstadt/Savoy album received good reviews and landed on several year-end Top Ten lists. It peaked at #146 on the Billboard album chart. The recording earned two Grammy Award nominations, including Best Traditional Folk Album and Best Engineered Album, Non-Classical.

== Track listing ==
1. "Opening" – 0:32
2. "Adieu False Heart" (Arthur Smith) – 3:34
3. "I Can't Get Over You" (Julie Miller) – 3:07
4. "Marie Mouri" (David Greely) – 3:31
5. "King of Bohemia" (Richard Thompson) – 3:04
6. "Plus Tu Tournes" (Michel Hindenoch) – 2:45
7. "Go Away From My Window" (John Jacob Niles) – 3:01
8. "Burns' Supper" (Thompson) – 3:43
9. "The One I Love Is Gone" (Bill Monroe) – 2:37
10. "Interlude" – 0:24
11. "Rattle My Cage" (Chas Justus) – 2:48
12. "Parlez-Moi D'Amour" (Jean Lenoir) – 4:06
13. "Too Old To Die Young" (Scott Dooley, John Hadley, Kevin Welch) – 3:17
14. "Interlude" – 0:31
15. "Walk Away Renée" (Michael Brown, Bob Calilli, Tony Sansone) – 3:26
16. "Closing" – 1:08

== Personnel ==
- Linda Ronstadt – harmony vocals (2, 4–6, 8, 10, 12, 13), lead vocals (3, 5, 7, 11, 13 (3rd verse), 15)
- Ann Savoy – lead vocals (2, 4, 6, 8, 9, 12, 13, 15) (on choruses and 3rd verse) harmony vocals (3, 7, 11), acoustic guitar (6, 12)
- Tim Lauer – accordion (3)
- Sam Broussard – acoustic guitar (2, 5, 7, 8, 15)
- Buddy Miller – acoustic guitar (3)
- Chas Justus – acoustic guitar (4, 6, 9, 12)
- Joel Savoy – acoustic guitar (4, 9), lead guitar (6), fiddle (9)
- Bryan Sutton – acoustic guitar (13)
- Dirk Powell – fretless banjo (2, 11, 16), upright bass (5), accordion (8, 9)
- Sam Bush – mandolin (7, 8, 11)
- Bryon House – upright bass (2, 3, 7, 8, 11, 13, 15)
- Eric Frey – upright bass (4, 6, 9, 12)
- Christine Balfa – triangle (6)
- David Schnaufer – bowed dulcimer (2, 10, 13), dulcimer (11, 13, 14)
- Stuart Duncan – fiddle (2, 11, 13)
- Kevin Wimmer – fiddle (4, 6, 9)
- John Catchings – cello (5, 7, 8, 15)
- Andrea Zonn – resophonic viola (1, 16), viola (3), violin (5, 7, 8, 12, 15)
- Kristin Wilkinson – viola (5, 7, 8, 15), string arrangements (5, 7, 8, 15)

=== Production ===
- Steve Buckingham – producer
- Gary Paczosa – recording, mixing
- Robert Gatley – assistant engineer
- Brandon Bell – additional engineer
- Doug Sax – mastering
- Sangwook Nam – mastering
- The Mastering Lab (Ojai, California) – mastering location
- Lesli Halingstad – production assistant
- Georgette Cartwright – creative services
- Amy L. Von Holzhausen – creative director
- Ann Savoy – design concept, all other photography
- Rocky Schenck – front and back cover photography
- Barry Ridge Graphic Design and Drew Cartwright – back cover composite

== Charts ==
Chart (2006)	Peak position
Australian Albums (ARIA)	189

== Release history ==
Release history and formats for Adieu False Heart
Region	Date	Format	Label	Ref.
North America	June 25, 2006	Compact disc	Vanguard Records	
