= The Balfa Brothers =

American music ensemble

- Ray Abshire playing with The Balfa Brothers at the Festival Acadian in Lafayette, 1974

Background information
- Origin: Louisiana, United States
- Genre: Cajun
- Labels: Swallow, Sonet, Valcour
- Past members: Dewey Balfa, Will Balfa, Rodney Balfa, and Hadley Fontenot

The Balfa Brothers (or Les Frères Balfa) were an American cajun music ensemble. Its members were five brothers: Dewey on fiddle; Will on fiddle; Rodney on guitar, harmonica, and vocals; Burkeman on triangle and spoons; and Harry on Cajun accordion.

== History ==
The brothers first played together at family gatherings in the 1940s. Their father, Charles Balfa, a sharecropper, had played fiddle and was a singer. Along with Hadley Fontenot, an accordionist and acquaintance of the family, they made their first recordings in 1951. The 78rpm single was "La Valse de Bon Baurche" b/w "Le Two Step de Ville Platte", recorded at their house. After this Dewey went on to a successful solo career, recording on his own and with many ensembles.

Adopting the name Balfa Brothers in 1967, Dewey, Rodney, Will, Hadley Fontenot, and Dewey's daughter Nelda started touring folk festivals and European venues, playing Cajun music at a time in which its impact on American music had largely been forgotten. They made their first new recordings that year, and played at the 1968 Summer Olympics in Mexico City.

They released several albums and appeared in the 1972 documentary Spend it All. Over time they experimented with blending traditional Cajun music with more modern orchestral sounds. They continued together until 1979; that year Rodney and Will died in an auto accident. In 1980, Dewey's wife died of trichinosis. Following further lineup changes, the group continued under the name a few years later, and an ensemble continued to perform even after Dewey died in 1992.

The Balfa Brothers, performing with Marc Savoy, made notable film appearances in two Hollywood productions: the 1981 Walter Hill film Southern Comfort, where they perform "Parlez-nous à Boire", and the 1986 film The Big Easy, where Dewey Balfa appears in an uncredited role performing "La valse de Balfa" during a backyard barbecue scene. Their song "La Danse de Mardi Gras" appears on the soundtracks for the 1992 film Passion Fish, the 2012 film Beasts of the Southern Wild, and Serenity. It also appeared in a commercial for Carling Black Label Lager.

Two of the Balfa Brothers, along with the late Cajun accordionist Danny Poulard, are briefly in the movie Garlic Is As Good As Ten Mothers, a 1980 documentary film about garlic directed by Les Blank.

== Discography ==
Allie Young, Dewey Balfa, Dick Richard and Rodney Balfa at the Library of Congress, 1977.

- The Balfa Brothers Play Traditional Cajun Music (Swallow Records, 1967)
- The Cajuns (Sonet Records, 1972)
- The Good Times are Killing Me (Swallow Records, 1972)
- The Balfa Brothers Play Traditional Cajun Music Vol. 2 (1974)
- J'ai Vu le Loup, Le Renard et la Belette (1976, re-released Rounder Records, 1988)
- The Balfa Brothers and Nathan Abshire: The 1970 NYC Cajun Concert (Field Recorders Collective, 2008)
- The Balfa Family: A Retrospective - Festivals Acadiens et Créoles 1977-2010 (Valcour Records, 2012)

== See also ==
- List of people related to Cajun music
- History of Cajun music
