= The Revelers (Louisiana) =

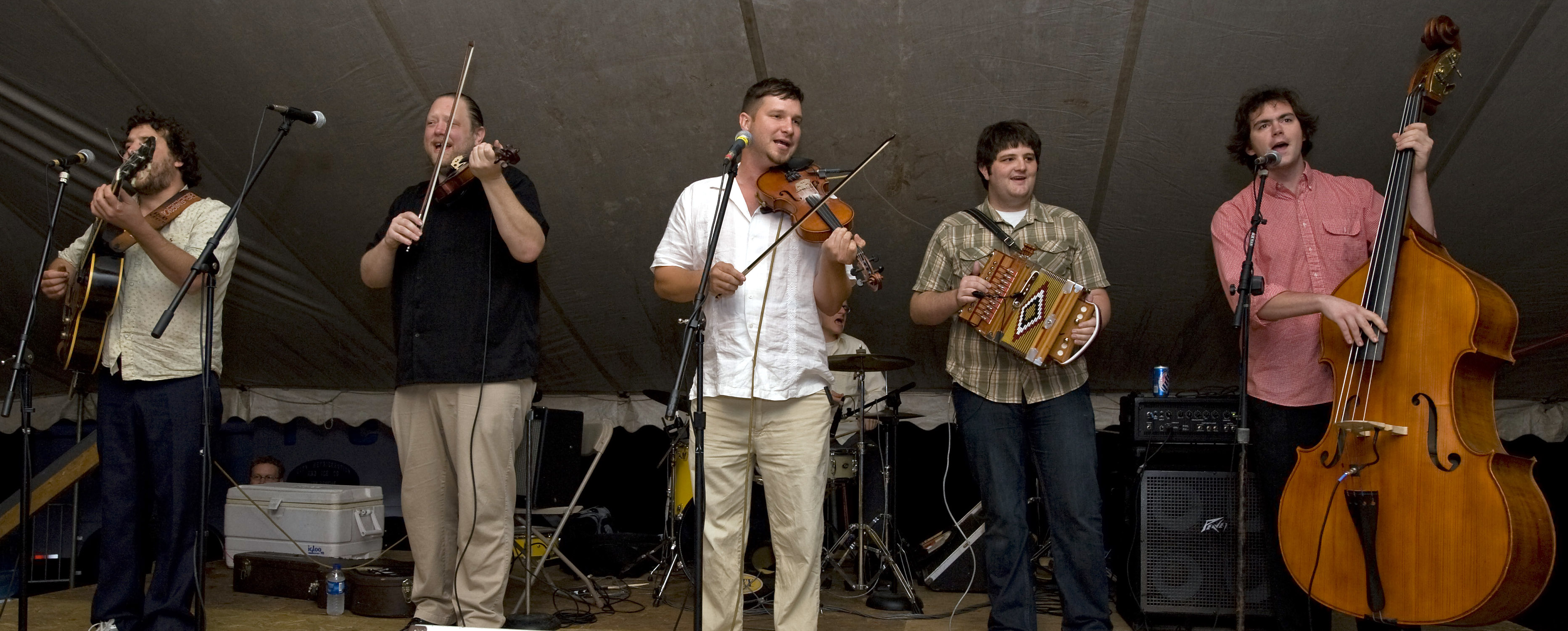
- The Revelers

Background information
- Origin: Louisiana, United States
- Genres: Cajun; Swamp Pop; Zydeco; Americana
- Years active: 2010–present
- Members: Trey Boudreaux; Daniel Coolik; Glenn Fields; Chas Justus; Blake Miller; Chris Miller; Kelli Jones
- Past members: Eric Frey
- Website: revelersband.com

The Revelers are a Louisiana music group, composed of founding members of the Red Stick Ramblers and the Pine Leaf Boys. They play in the styles of Cajun, zydeco, Swamp Pop, and Americana. There is no leader and everyone sings and writes music.

== Origin ==
The Revelers were founded in 2010. Longtime collaborator Chris Miller joined the band full-time in January 2013 and Trey Boudreaux joined the band in 2017. The band relocated from Lafayette to Breaux Bridge, Louisiana in 2018.

== Career ==
The Revelers have toured the United States and Canada extensively, the UK, Ireland, and Denmark. They are a festival mainstay having played at the Blackpot Festival, Tønder, Shakori Hills, both Rhythm and Roots, Wheatland, Sugar Maple Fest, Festival International de Louisiane, Grey Fox, Clearwater's Hudson River Revival, the Red Wing Roots Music Festival and countless others. They are also in-demand in the music education scene, having been on staff at Ashokan Fiddle & Dance, Balfa Week, Miles of Music Camp, FiddleTunes, and Blackpot Camp.

== Awards ==
In 2016, the Revelers received a Grammy Award nomination for Best Regional Roots Music Album for Get Ready.

The Revelers have been named "The Best Thing to come out of Louisiana in Recent History" by the Cajun Creole Culture Preservation International™.

== Discography ==
The Revelers

- Released: 2012
- Format: CD, digital download, music streaming
- Label: not on label (independent)
- Tracks:
  - "Des fois (Sometimes)"
  - "If You Ain't Got Love"
  - "Cry for You"
  - "Kidnapper"
  - "Jukebox Songs"
  - "J'avais l'habitude (I Used To)"
  - "Wang Wang Blues"
  - "La valse de Cadien"
  - "Blues Take a Holiday"
  - "Asteur je peux voir (Now I Can See)"
  - "I'm Glad for Your Sake (But I'm Sorry for Mine)"
  - "La jolie fleur du bois (The Beautiful Flower of the Wood)"
  - "I Don't Wanna Go Home"

Play the Swamp Pop Classics, Volume 1 [EP]

- Released: 2014
- Format: CD, digital download, music streaming
- Label: not on label (independent)
- Tracks:
  - "Let the Good Times Roll"
  - "Before I Grow Old"
  - "The Lonely Room"
  - "Who's Afraid of Virginia Woolf?"

Get Ready

- Released: 2015
- Format: CD, digital download, music streaming
- Label: not on label (independent)
- Tracks:
  - "Toi, tu veux pus me voir (You don't want to see me anymore)"
  - "Play It Straight"
  - "Outta Sight"
  - "In The Proof"
  - "Pus whiskey (No More Whiskey)"
  - "Please Baby Please"
  - "Just When I Thought That I Was Dreaming"
  - "Single Jeans"
  - "Juste un 'tit brin (Just a Little Bit)"
  - "Being Your Clown"
  - "Ayoù on va danser (Where are We Going to Dance)?"

Play the Swamp Pop Classics, Volume 2 [EP]

- Released: 2016
- Format: CD, digital download, music streaming
- Label: not on label (independent)
- Tracks:
  - "A Trip To The Moon"
  - "If It’s Really Gotta Be This Way"
  - "Nobody Would Know"
  - "Lonely Women Make Good Lovers"

At the End of the River (Au bout de la rivière)

- Released: 2019
- Format: CD, digital download, music streaming
- Label: not on label (independent)
- Tracks:
  - "Au bout de la rivière (At The End Of The River)"
  - "Please Please, Like We Did Last Summer"
  - "Les blues à Blake (Blake's Blues)"
  - "Who Who, Yea You"
  - "She's a Woman"
  - "I Wouldn't Do That to You"
  - "Pendant je suis loin de toi (While I am Far from You)"
  - "You're Not To Blame"
  - "Bonsoir, petit monde (Good Night, Little World)"
  - "Southside Stomp"
  - "La bague diamante (The Diamond Ring)"
