= Foghorn Stringband =

American old-time string band

Foghorn Stringband is an old-time string band from Portland, Oregon, United States. They are considered one of the finest old-time string bands on the West Coast. They are noted for "intense dedication to the sources" of the old time tradition. Their music is billed as "a blend of high-spirited Appalachian dance music tying in sounds of traditional mountain fiddle tunes." Their interpretation of old time is played with the energy and edginess of punk rock, while at the same time showing a tremendous degree of technical finesse.

The group has performed at festivals all over the world, including at the Shetland Folk Festival in Shetland, UK, the Orkney Folk Festival in Orkney, UK, and in Ireland, Denmark, Finland and Malaysia. U.S. appearances include the Berkeley Old Time Music Convention, the Alaska Folk Festival, and the Sacajawea Bluegrass Festival.

Members of the group also perform as the Foghorn Duo (mandolin and fiddle) and the Foghorn Trio (mandolin, fiddle, and Nadine Landry on guitar). Foghorn Stringband also performs with Dirk Powell as the Dirk Powell Band.

== History ==
The founding members of the band met at The National Oldtime Fiddlers' Contest in Weiser, Idaho in 2000. The band was originally named Foghorn Leghorn and the lineup consisted of Stephen "Sammy" Lind on fiddle and vocals, P. T. Grover, Jr., on banjo, Caleb Klauder on mandolin and vocals, and Brian Bagdonas on bass. Rhythm guitarist and singer Kevin Sandri joined later, replacing the original part-time fifth member of the group, guitarist Jesse Withers. This lineup was in place from 2001 to approximately 2008, and is featured on albums: Rattlesnake Tidal Wave (2002), Reap What You Sow, Weiser Sunrise, and Boombox Square Dance. In 2008 - 2009 Lind and Klauder toured as a duo and released the album Lonesome Song under the name Foghorn Duo. The lineup changed back to a full string band from 2009 - 2011, with Patrick Lind on rhythm guitar and vocals, Peter Leone on banjo and vocals, and Nadine Landry on bass and vocals. While the full string band recorded during this era there are no released albums. At times, Lind, Klauder, and Landry toured together as a trio and released the album Sud de la Louisiane under the name Foghorn Trio in 2011. In the winter of 2011, Reeb Willms joined the band on vocals and guitar. The current lineup of the band from 2011 to present is Stephen "Sammy" Lind on fiddle, banjo, and vocals, Caleb Klauder on mandolin, fiddle, and vocals, Nadine Landry on bass and vocals, and Reeb Willms on rhythm guitar and vocals. There are three recordings from this current iteration: Outshine the Sun (2012), Devil in the Seat (2015), and Rock Island Grange (2018).

== Discography ==
In September 2002, the group changed its name to Foghorn Stringband and recorded an album Rattlesnake Tidal Wave, which they self-released on their own Foghorn Music label in November 2002. Another self-released album, Reap What You Sow, came out in August 2004. Like many other modern string bands, Foghorn moved to a major label, releasing its third album, Weiser Sunrise, on pop label Nettwerk America in August 2005. Boombox Squaredance is a collection of outtakes from the Reap What You Sow sessions released in spring 2007. Lonesome Song by the Foghorn Duo was released in 2008. Sud de la Louisiane by the Foghorn Trio was released in October 2011. Outshine The Sun was released by The Foghorn Stringband in September 2012 and Devil in the Seat was released in January 2015. Rock Island Grange was released in 2018.

== Solo work ==
Caleb Klauder also performs country music with his Caleb Klauder Country Band, and has released three albums: Dangerous Mes and Poisonous Yous (2007) Western Country (2010), and Innocent Road was released in 2016 and features Reeb Willms on guitar and vocals. Klauder is also a member of Jesse Lége, Joel Savoy & The Cajun Country Revival. Nadine Landry and Stephen "Sammy" Lind tour occasionally as a duo, and released an album under their names called Grandad's Favorite. Lind also released two educational old-time fiddle DVDs. Reeb Willms and Caleb Klauder also tour occasionally as a duo and have released an album called Oh Do You Remember in 2012.
