= Wilson Savoy =

American musician and singer

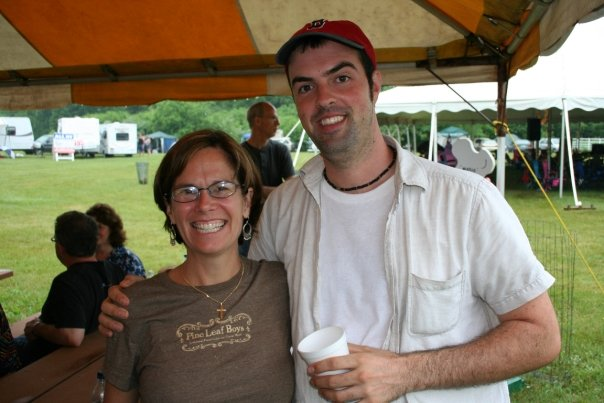
- A fan with Savoy in June 2008

Background information
- Born: February 1, 1982 (age 44)
- Origin: Eunice, Louisiana, United States
- Genres: Cajun, folk
- Occupation: Musician
- Instruments: Cajun accordion, keyboards, fiddle, vocals
- Years active: 2000–present
- Labels: Rounder, Swallow, Valcour

Wilson Allen Savoy (born February 1, 1982, in Eunice, Louisiana) is a Grammy-winning accordionist, keyboard player, fiddler and singer with the Cajun bands Pine Leaf Boys and The Band Courtbouillon, as well as a local filmmaker in Lafayette, Louisiana. His father Marc Savoy, famous accordion builder and musician, and his mother, Ann Savoy, musician, author and music producer, are well known ambassadors and supporters of preserving the Cajun culture.

== History ==
Wilson Savoy was born in Eunice and began his musical career in 2000 with the Savoy Family Band (consisting of his father Marc, mother Ann, and brother Joel Savoy). Since 2000 he has also operated Almena Pictures, a film company specializing in band documentaries and music videos. In 2004 he joined the Red Stick Ramblers from Baton Rouge, Louisiana and in 2005 formed his own band, the Pine Leaf Boys. In 2006 he and his brother Joel (a fiddle player, cofounder of Valcour Records and also a former member of the Red Stick Ramblers) were instrumental in starting the annual Faquetigue Courir de Mardi Gras as an alternative to the main Eunice event. They felt that the other local runs had gotten too rowdy and lost too much of their authentic traditions. The run has become one of the most musically based on the various versions of the courir. Also in 2006, he recorded a collection of 1930's era songs and classic Cajun Swing music with fellow traditional Cajun act the Lost Bayou Ramblers titled Mello Joy Boys: Une Tasse Cafe. In 2008 the Pine Leaf Boys were nominated for a Grammy Award for their 2007 album Blues de Musicien, released on Arhoolie Records. Fellow nominees that year were Geno Delafose, Roddie Romero, Lost Bayou Ramblers, the Racines and the winner of the Grammy Terrance Simien and the Zydeco Experience. In 2010 and 2011, Savoy appeared as himself in three episodes of the HBO series Treme. In 2013 the eponymous debut album of The Band Courtbouillion, featuring Savoy, Steve Riley and Wayne Toups won the Grammy Award in the Best Regional Roots Music Album category.

== Discography ==
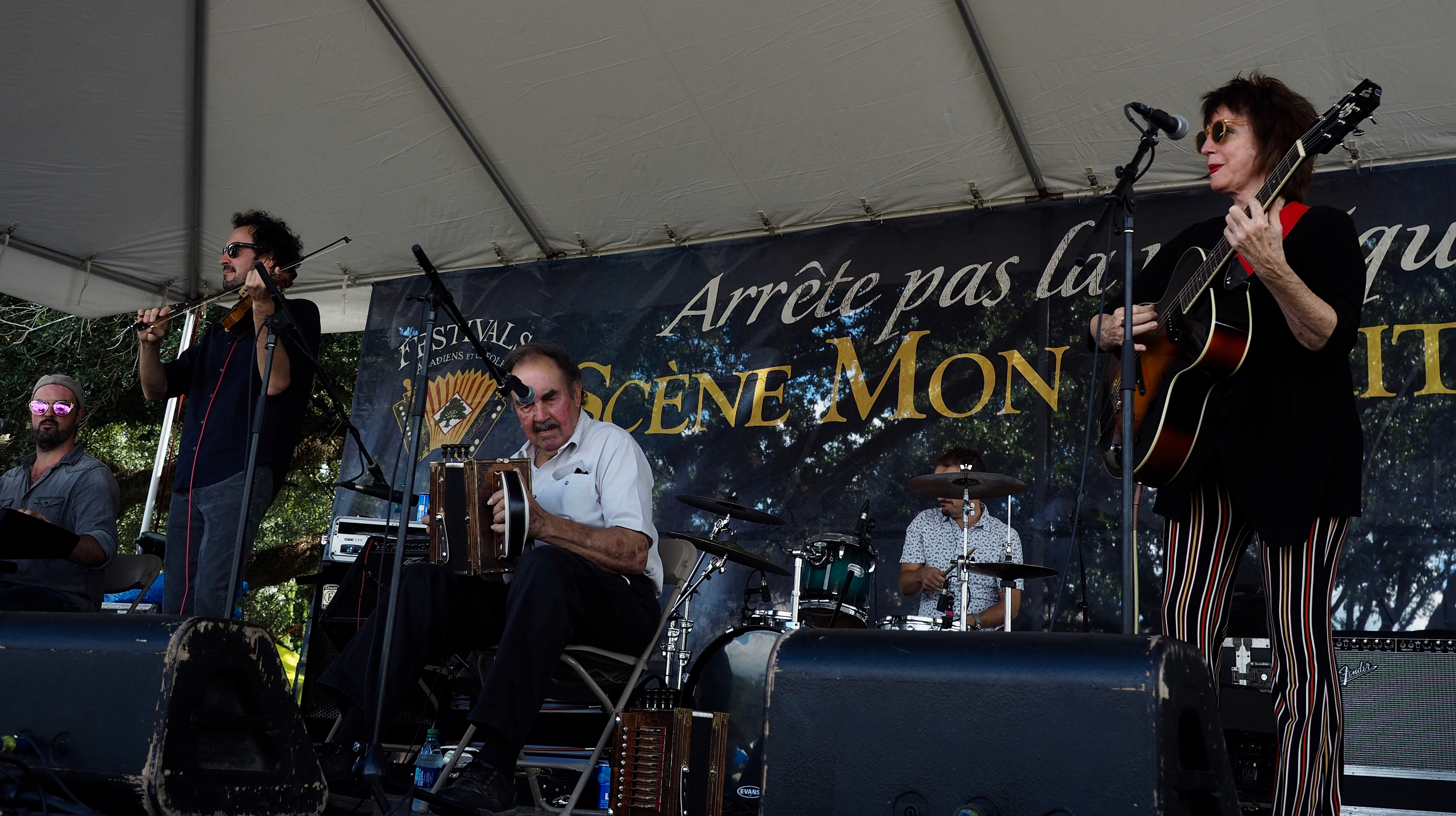
The Savoy Family Band, with Wilson on keyboards, performing at Festivals Acadiens et Creoles, October 2018

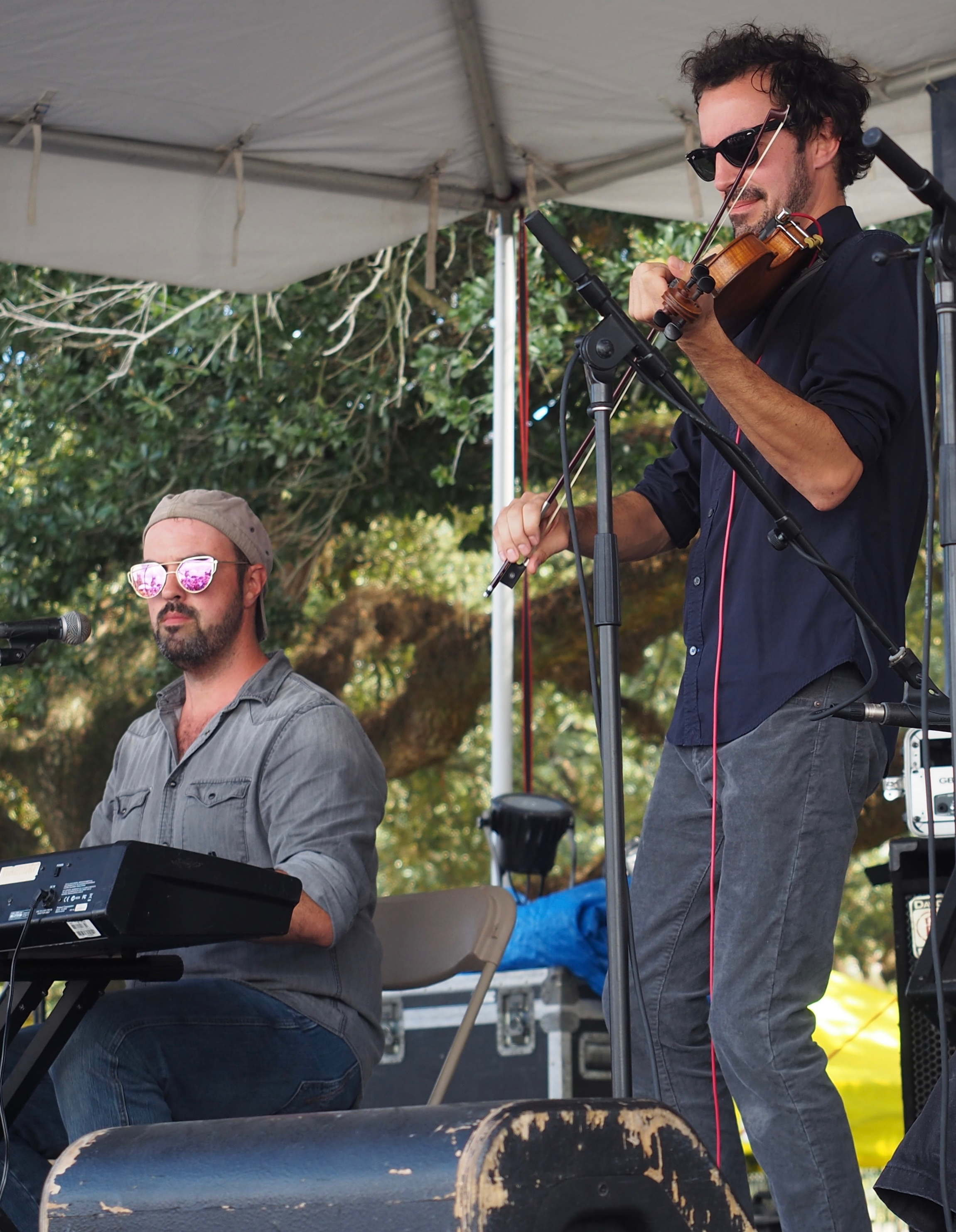
Wilson (left) and Joel (right) Savoy, October 2018.

- 2004: Savoy-Michot Cajun Band: L'autre bord de l'eau
- 2004: Church Point Aces avec Paul Daigle et Mitch Reed: Together At Last for the Last Time
- 2004: Red Stick Ramblers: Right Key, Wrong Keyhole (Rounder Records)
- 2006: Lost Bayou Ramblers: Mello Joy Boys: Une Tasse Cafe (Swallow Records)
- 2007: Ann Savoy & Her Sleepless Knights: If Dreams Come True (Memphis Records)
- 2011: The Band Courtbouillion: The Band Courtbouillion (Valcour Records)
- 2013: Joel Savoy: Joel Savoy's Honky Tonk Merry-Go-Round (Valcour Records)
- 2015: various artists: I Wanna Sing Right: Rediscovering Lomax in the Evangeline Country four-EP set (Valcour Records)

See also

- Pine Leaf Boys§Discography.
- Savoy Family Band§Discography

== Awards ==
=== Grammy Awards ===
Year	Nominated work	Award	Result	Ref.
2008	Blues de Musicien	Best Zydeco or Cajun Music Album	Nominated	
2009	Homage Au Passé	Best Zydeco or Cajun Music Album	Nominated	
2010	Live At 2009 New Orleans Jazz & Heritage Festival	Best Zydeco or Cajun Music Album	Nominated	
2011	Back Home	Best Zydeco or Cajun Music Album	Nominated	
2013	The Band Courtbouillon	Best Regional Roots Music Album	Won	

== See also ==
- Pine Leaf Boys
- Savoy Family Band
- History of Cajun Music
- List of Notable People Related to Cajun Music
