= Till I'm Too Old to Die Young =

Single by Moe Bandy

from the album You Haven't Heard the Last of Me
- B-side: "You Can't Straddle the Fence Anymore"
- Released: February 1987
- Genre: Country
- Label: MCA/Curb
- Songwriters: Scott Dooley; John Hadley; Kevin Welch
- Producer: Jerry Kennedy

Moe Bandy singles chronology
"One Man Band" (1986)	"Till I'm Too Old to Die Young" (1987)	"You Haven't Heard the Last of Me" (1987)

"Till I'm Too Old to Die Young" is a song recorded by American country music artist Moe Bandy. It was released in February 1987 as the second single from his album You Haven't Heard the Last of Me. The song peaked at number 6 on the Billboard Hot Country Singles chart.

The song was also released on the 2004 album You Can't Save Everybody by Kieran Kane and Kevin Welch with Fats Kaplin; and was released under the title "Too Old to Die Young" on the 2006 album Adieu False Heart by Linda Ronstadt with Ann Savoy.

== Charts ==
=== Weekly charts ===
Chart (1987)	Peak position
US Hot Country Songs (Billboard)	6
Canadian RPM Country Tracks	10

=== Year-end charts ===
Chart (1987)	Position
US Hot Country Songs (Billboard)	37
