= Black Coffee =

Black coffee is coffee without creamer or milk.

Black coffee or Black Coffee may also refer to:

== Music ==
- Chorny Kofe (Russian for Black Coffee), Russian heavy metal band

=== Albums ===
- Black Coffee (Peggy Lee album), 1956
- Black Coffee (Johnny "Hammond" Smith album), 1962
- Black Coffee (Ann Savoy album), 2010
- Black Coffee (Beth Hart and Joe Bonamassa album), 2018

=== Songs ===
- "Black Coffee" (1948 song), written by Sonny Burke, the lyrics by Paul Francis Webster
- "Black Coffee" (All Saints song), 2000
- "Black Coffee" (Heavy D & the Boyz song), 1994
- "Black Coffee" (Lacy J. Dalton song), 1990
- "Black Coffee" (Ike & Tina Turner song), a 1972 song covered by Humble Pie and Rival Sons
- "Black Coffee", a 1984 song by Black Flag from the album Slip It In
- "Black Coffee", a 1995 song by Less Than Jake from their album Pezcore

== People ==
- Black Coffee (DJ) (born 1976), a South African DJ

== Literature, theater, and film ==
- Black Coffee (play), a 1930 play by Agatha Christie
  - Black Coffee (1931 film), a British detective film based on Agatha Christie's play
  - Black Coffee (novel), a 1998 novelisation by Charles Osborne of Agatha Christie's play
- Black Coffee (2014 film), an American romantic comedy film
- Black Coffee (2021 film), a Malayalam drama film

== See also ==
- Black Coffee Blues, a 1992 book written by Henry Rollins
