= Duets (Linda Ronstadt album) =

Compilation album by Linda Ronstadt
- Released: April 8, 2014
- Genres: Adult contemporary, country-pop, soft rock, country-rock
- Length: 50:10
- Label: Rhino

Linda Ronstadt chronology
Linda Ronstadt Greatest Hits I & II (2007)	Duets (2014)	Opus Collection (2014)

Duets is a compilation album by Linda Ronstadt. It was released on the Rhino Records label in April 2014, a few days before Ronstadt's induction into the Rock & Roll Hall of Fame.

The album peaked at number 32 on the Billboard album chart - Ronstadt's highest charting album in 24 years. The songs on the album were all previously released with the exception of "Pretty Bird", a duet with bluegrass singer Laurie Lewis. In his review for AllMusic critic Stephen Thomas Erlewine states that "generally, this Duets emphasizes the sweeter, softer, and slower side of Ronstadt, a move that makes for pleasant listening".

== Track listing ==
No.	Title	Writer(s)	Duet with	Length
1.	"Adieu False Heart"	Arthur Smith	Ann Savoy	3:34
2.	"I Can't Get Over You"	Julie Brown	Ann Savoy	3:06
3.	"Walk Away Renée"	Mike Brown, Bob Calilli, Tony Sansone	Ann Savoy	3:24
4.	"The New Partner Waltz"	Charlie Louvin, Ira Louvin	Carl Jackson	2:50
5.	"I Never Will Marry"	traditional	Dolly Parton	3:13
6.	"Pretty Bird"	Hazel Dickens	Laurie Lewis	2:38
7.	"I Can't Help It (If I'm Still in Love with You)"	Hank Williams	Emmylou Harris	2:46
8.	"Hasten Down the Wind"	Warren Zevon	Don Henley	2:42
9.	"Prisoner in Disguise"	JD Souther	JD Souther	3:53
10.	"It's Gonna Work Out Fine"	Rose Marie McCoy, Sylvia McKinney	James Taylor	4:01
11.	"Don't Know Much"	Barry Mann, Tom Snow, Cynthia Weil	Aaron Neville	3:34
12.	"All My Life"	Karla Bonoff	Aaron Neville	3:31
13.	"Somewhere Out There"	James Horner, Barry Mann, Cynthia Weil	James Ingram	3:59
14.	"Sisters"	Irving Berlin	Bette Midler	2:54
15.	"Moonlight in Vermont"	John Blackburn, Karl Suessdorf	Frank Sinatra	4:05

== Charts ==
Chart (2014)	Peak position
Australian Albums (ARIA)	131

== Release history ==
Release history and formats for Duets
Region	Date	Format	Label	Ref.
North America	April 8, 2014	CD	Rhino Records	
