= Cedric Watson =

American musician (born 1983)

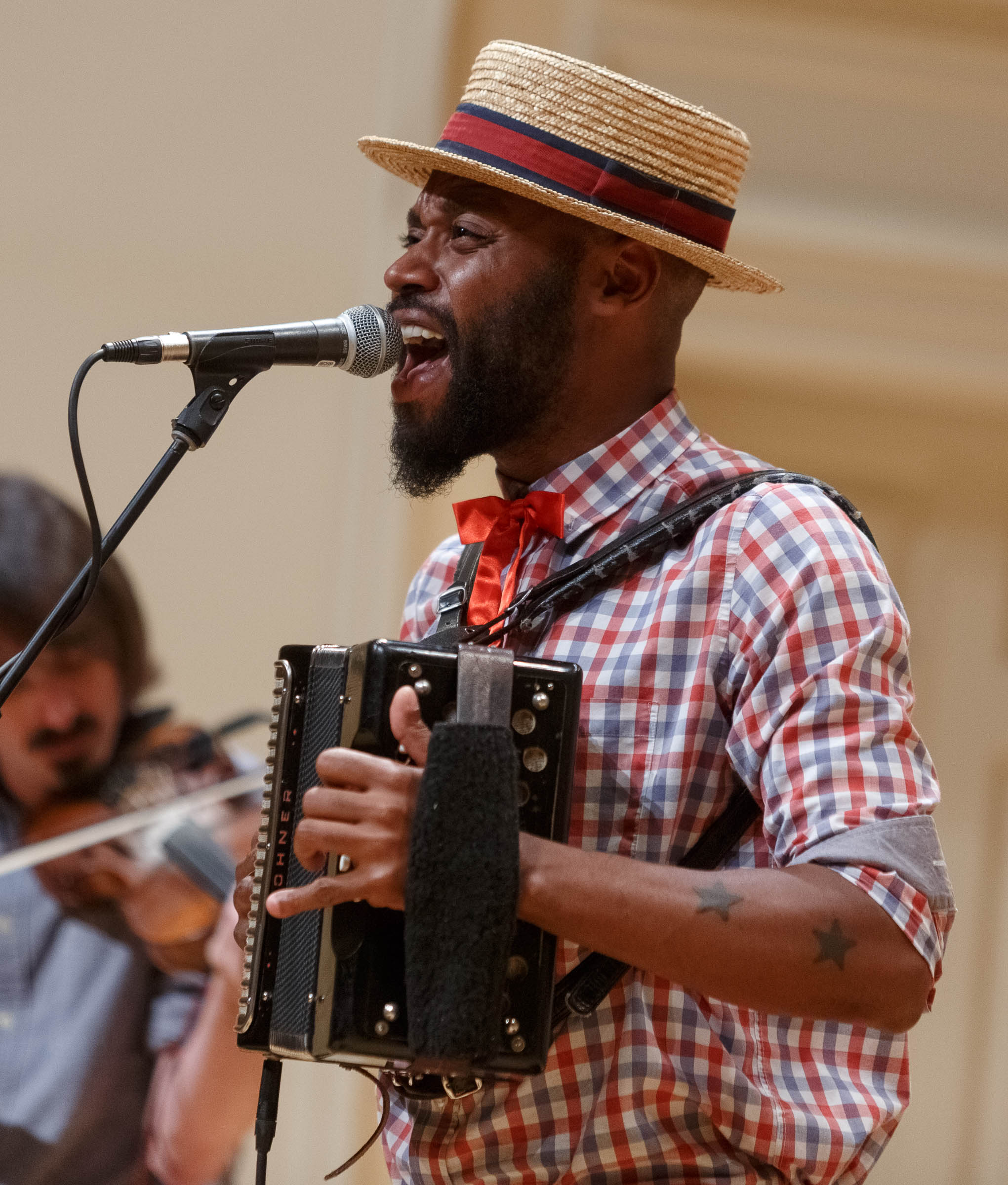
- Watson performs at the Library of Congress in 2019

Background information
- Born: Cedric Watson; 1983 (age 42–43)
- Origin: San Felipe, Texas
- Genres: Cajun, Creole
- Instruments: fiddle, Cajun accordion, vocals
- Label: Valcour Records
- Formerly of: Bijou Creole; Pine Leaf Boys

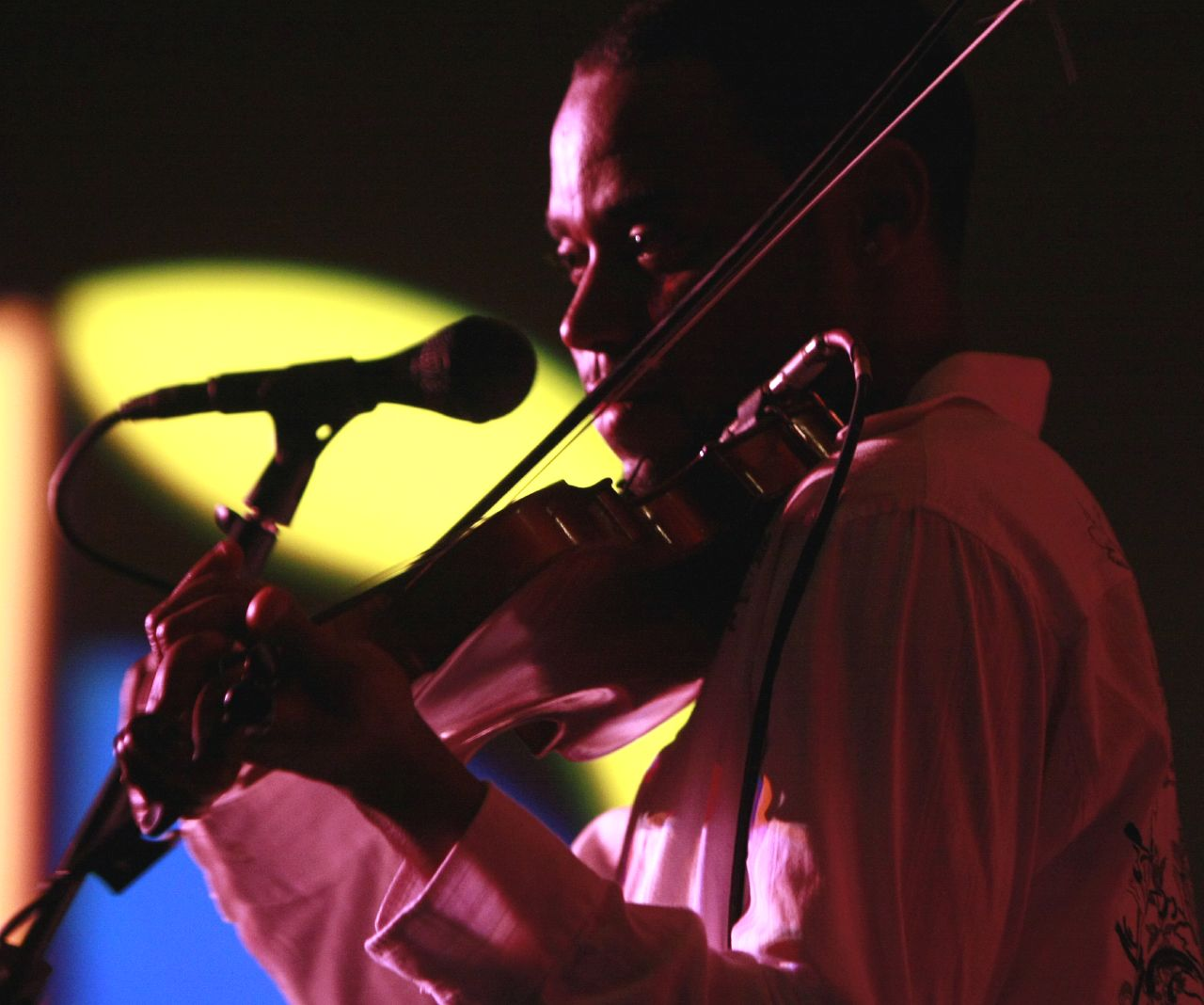
Watson plays fiddle with Bijou Creole at the Savannah Music Festival, 2009

Cedric Watson (born 1983) is an American musician. He has been nominated four times for Grammy Awards.

== Career ==
Born in 1983, Cedric grew up in San Felipe, Texas surrounded by the blues, old soul, country, and zydeco music. Though hip-hop was then popular amongst his peers, Cedric developed an affinity for the old-style French songs of Southwest Louisiana and the greater Houston area. He soon found himself in Lafayette, Louisiana where he became part of the musical community and began contributing to the continuity of Creole music.

He has played with some of the great names in Creole music, such as Dexter Ardoin and the Creole Ramblers and Jeffrey Broussard and the Creole Cowboys. With the Pine Leaf Boys, Cedric added a Creole and zydeco foundation to the group's roots Southwest Louisiana sound. Cedric continues to explore the roots of Louisiana's Creole music with his own band, Bijou Creole.

He has performed in places across the United States as well as in France, Nova Scotia, Haiti, and Spain. He has said he wants "to present the Creole Nation of Louisiana to the Creole Nations in other parts of the world, to make these Creole cultures aware of the one in Louisiana, and vice versa."

In 2010 Watson appeared in season 1 episode 7 of the HBO series Treme with Wilson Savoy and Watson's replacement in the Pine Leaf Boys Courtney Granger. The scenes depict Annie (Lucia Micarelli) trying out to join the Pine Leaf Boys on a Canadian tour as Watson's replacement, but choking at the audition. Watson actually left the band to form Bijou Creole in 2006, not 2005 as depicted in the show.

== Musical style ==
Cedric Watson plays a variety of old-school zydeco styles, original material, and Creole traditionals. The polyrhythmic and syncopated sounds of Africa and the Caribbean echo in his ensemble. He plays old La-La French music (traditional Creole music) in accordion, fiddle, and guitar with mentors Edward Poullard and James Adams in Les Amis Creole . With accordionist Corey "Lil' Pop" Ledet, he displays the more blues and R&B influence of Clifton Chenier, John Delafose, Canray Fontenot, Beau Jocque (Andrus Espree ) and Bebe Carrier. "Cedric's creative style and obvious joy in playing make him an engaging and exciting performer. Moving with ease between fiddle and accordion, his natural playfulness on stage makes him just plain fun to watch." More recently with Bijou Creole, he is "developing an expansive modern take on his adopted state's already hybridized Creole sounds, flavoring it with hearty injections of soul and Caribbean influences as well as whiffs of bluegrass and string-band music—an approach that reached its fullest expression yet on [2013's] Le Troubadour Creole."

== Discography ==
- Les Amis Creole Les Amis Creole (sic) (2006) Arhoolie Records
- Goin' Down to Louisiana Cedric Watson and Corey Ledet (2006) Valcour Records—ASIN: B000GBE8EM
- Cedric Watson (2008) Valcour Records—ASIN: B00151HZYW
- Homage Au Passe with Pine Leaf Boys (2009) Lionsgate Records—ASIN: B0023BZ64E
- L'Esprit Creole with Bijou Creole (2009) Valcour Records—ASIN: B0030E7PZ6
- Creole Moon: Live From Blue Moon Saloon (2010) Valcour Records
- Le Soleil Est Leve with Bijou Creole (2011) Lache Pas Records [Watson's own label]
- Le Troubadour Creole with Bijou Creole (2013) Lache Pas Records

=== Compilations ===
- Allons Boire un Coup: A Collection of Cajun and Creole Drinking Songs Various (2006) Valcour Records
- En Francais: Cajun 'n' Creole Rock 'n' Roll Various (2011) Bayou Teche Brewing/CD Baby

=== On Others' Recordings ===
- L'autre bord de l'eau Savoy-Michot Cajun Band (2004)
- Transatlantic Sessions: Songs of Death, Divorce, Drinking and Dancing Cajun Roosters (2011) Whoopee Records-Pine Groove Sound/CD Baby
- Movin' On Ilana Katz Katz (2016)
