= C. C. Adcock =

American musician

- Born: Charles Clinton Adcock; 1971 (age 54–55); Lafayette, Louisiana, U.S.
- Genres: Electric blues, swamp blues, cajun, zydeco, folk rock
- Occupations: Musician, songwriter, record producer, film and television composer
- Years active: 1980s–present
- Member of: Lil' Band O' Gold
- Website: www.yeproc.com/artists/c-c-adcock

C. C. Adcock (born Charles Clinton Adcock, 1971) is an American singer, songwriter, guitarist and blues rock musician, noted for his cajun, zydeco, electric blues and swamp pop-influenced sound and for his efforts to preserve and promote swamp pop music. He is also a Grammy-nominated music producer and film and TV composer.

== Biography ==
Adcock was first signed to Island Records at the age of 22 by noted record producer and A&R man Denny Cordell, who also produced Adcock's debut album. The two met when they were both working at a Hollywood soundstage in Lafayette, Louisiana. Adcock has worked with Academy-Award-winning composer and record producer Jack Nitzsche, and he has produced his own recordings as well as the work of artists including Robert Plant, Florence + The Machine, Nick Cave and Neko Case, Steve Riley & the Mamou Playboys and Doyle Bramhall. He has also worked as a composer and music supervisor for motion pictures and television shows, including Academy Award-winning director William Friedkin's Killer Joe, 30 Beats and The X Factor.

He writes, records and tours with his band The Lafayette Marquis as well as swamp pop supergroup Lil' Band O' Gold. He has performed and toured with Bo Diddley, Buckwheat Zydeco, as well as alongside his mentor, Lafayette, Louisiana guitarist Paul "Lil' Buck" Sinegal in Cowboy Stew Blues Revue.

His music and productions have also been prominently featured in the HBO television shows True Blood and Treme.

== Recording artist ==
Adcock has recorded two solo albums: the self-titled C. C. Adcock (produced by Tarka Cordell), issued in 1994 on the Island label, mixed at Chris Blackwell's Compass Point Studios by Terry Manning, and reissued in 2000 on the Evangeline label under the title House Rocker; and Lafayette Marquis, issued in 2004 on the Yep Roc label.

Adcock is also a co-founder of the south Louisiana supergroup Lil' Band O' Gold, which also includes swamp pop pioneer Warren Storm on drums, accordionist Steve Riley, pianist David Egan and saxophonist Dickie Landry. Together, they have released three albums: their eponymous debut on Shanachie Records; The Promised Land (2010, Dust Devil Music, and 2011, Room 609 Records); and Plays Fats, which features Lil' Band O' Gold performing the music of Fats Domino with guests including Robert Plant and Lucinda Williams, and which was released in 2012 on the Dust Devil Music record label.

Adcock has also made guest appearances on other artists' albums, including several by Steve Riley & the Mamou Playboys, Ani DiFranco and Doyle Bramhall.

== Record producer ==
In addition to his solo recordings and work with Lil' Band O' Gold, Adcock has also produced the Grammy-nominated albums Grand Isle by Steve Riley & the Mamou Playboys and Is It News by Doyle Bramhall.

In 2011, Adcock produced Florence + The Machine’s version of Buddy Holly's "Not Fade Away" for the tribute compilation Rave On. Adcock has also produced Neko Case, Nick Cave and Jace Everett for soundtrack albums for the HBO television series True Blood.

In 2012, Adcock produced "We Can't Make It Here Anymore" by Steve Earle, Joan Baez and James McMurtry for Occupy This Album.

In 2022 he teamed with veteran swamp pop entertainer Tommy McLain, then in his eighties, to produce McLain's I Ran Down Every Dream. The album, Rolling Stone magazine noted, is "his first pop album in decades" whose title track is "a duet and co-write with [Elvis] Costello. . . ."

== Film and television composer ==
Adcock's songs have been featured in the motion pictures Blaze, Heaven's Prisoners and Black Snake Moan, and he has worked as a music supervisor and composer for the films Killer Joe, 30 Beats, Macumba, Dirty Politix and Night Orchid.

His original songs and productions have also been featured on the Grammy-nominated soundtrack of the HBO series True Blood, and Adcock has appeared on the series' inaugural season performing with his group The Lafayette Marquis.

In March 2009, a documentary co-produced by Adcock, Promised Land: A Swamp Pop Journey, looked at life on the road with Lil' Band O' Gold. The film premiered at the South by Southwest (SXSW) festival in Austin, Texas.

== Discography ==
- C.C. Adcock (1994)
- Lafayette Marquis (2004)
