= Tarka Cordell =

English musician, writer, record producer, and model

Tarka Clay Cordell-Lavarack (28 July 1966 – 28 April 2008) was an English musician, writer, record producer, and model.

The son of record producer Denny Cordell, Cordell was born in Westminster, Greater London, and was educated at Harrow School.

His debut studio album was titled Wide Awake in a Dream, self-released on his own label, Room 609 Records.

An enthusiast of South Louisiana music, Cordell produced C. C. Adcock's eponymous debut album, and co-produced (with Adcock) the Bayou Ruler album by the Cajun band, Steve Riley and the Mamou Playboys.

On 28 April 2008, he was found dead at his apartment in Westminster, having committed suicide by hanging.

In March 2009, a documentary co-produced by Cordell, Promised Land: A Swamp Pop Journey, made its premiere at the South by Southwest (SXSW) festival in Austin, Texas. Cordell was listed posthumously on promotional material as one of the documentary's makers.
