= Pine Leaf Boys =

4 Members

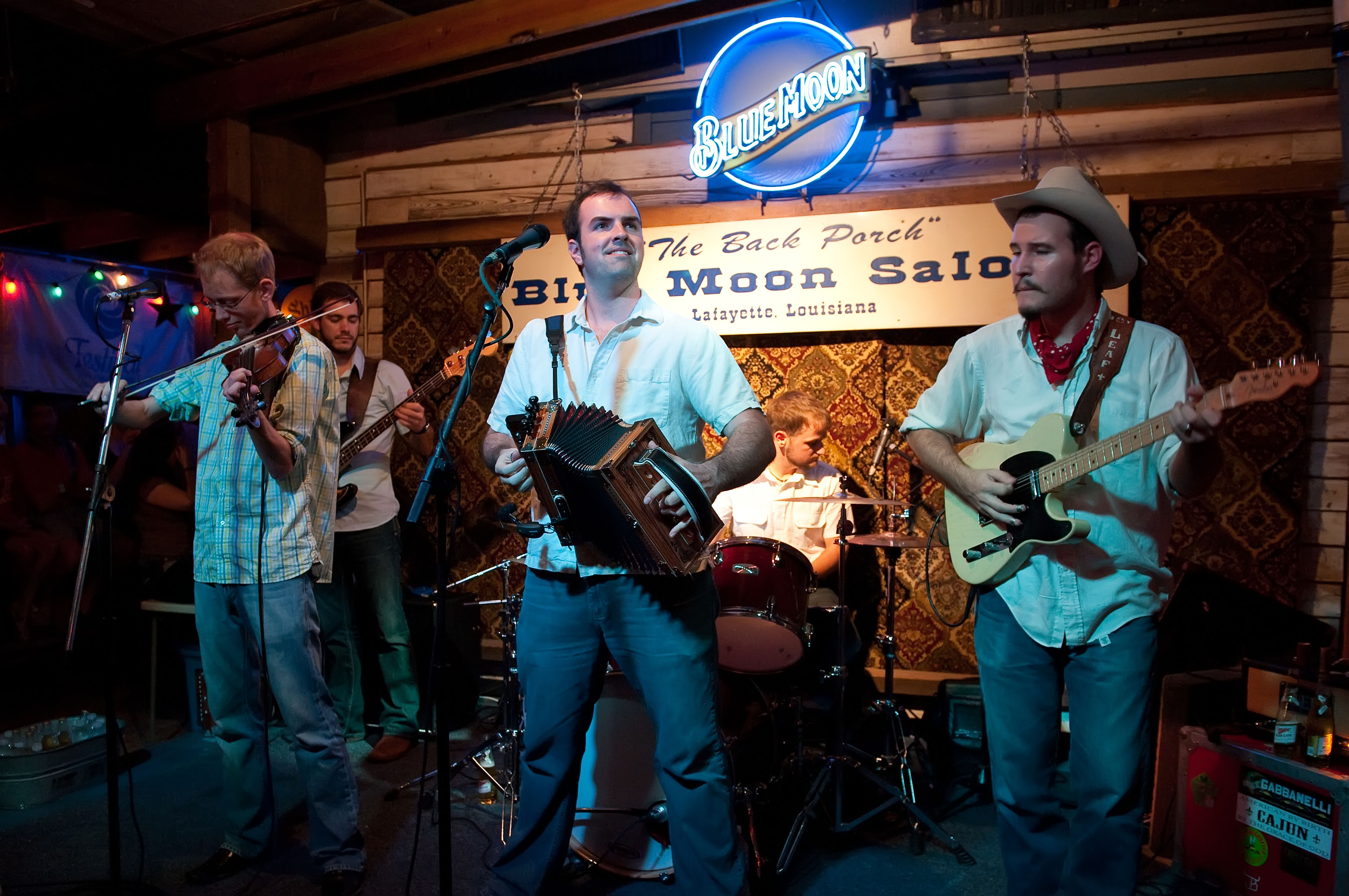
- Pine Leaf Boys at the Blue Moon Saloon.

Background information
- Origin: Louisiana, United States
- Genres: Cajun
- Labels: Arhoolie Records, Valcour Records
- Members: Wilson Savoy; Chris Segura; Drew Simon; Jean Bertrand; Thomas David
- Past members: Cedric Watson; Blake Miller; Courtney Granger
- Website: Pineleafboys.com/

The Pine Leaf Boys is an American Cajun and Creole band from South Louisiana, United States. Members include Wilson Savoy (accordion, piano, vocals), Chris Segura (fiddle, vocals), Drew Simon (drums and vocals), Jean Bertrand (guitars), and Thomas David (bass).

== Career ==
The band is known for playing traditional Cajun and Creole music from Southwest Louisiana, inspired by bands dating from the 1920s such as Amédé Ardoin to modern bands such as the Mamou Playboys, Jason Frey, Paul Daigle and Cajun Gold all the way up to Wayne Toups. The Pine Leaf Boys are an "international Cajun band," performing many shows each year in Europe. The Pine Leaf Boys were invited on a U.S. State Department Tour in 2009 to the Middle East, playing music in Saudi Arabia, the UAE, and Jerusalem. The band has been nominated for three Grammy Awards. Wilson Savoy, Courtney Granger, and former member Cedric Watson appeared in season 1 episode 7 of the HBO series Treme in 2010.

Courtney Granger died on 18 September 2021 from a suspected blood clot related to diabetes complications.

== Awards/activity ==
They have been nominated 4 time Grammy for "Best Cajun Album/Zydeco album.

The Pine Leaf Boys have won numerous awards, including nominations for Grammy Award for Best Zydeco or Cajun Music Album for their second album Blues de Musicien, as well as for Homage Au Passé, plus two Cajun French Music Association Awards. They have 6 world tours for US State Department.

== Discography ==
- Allons Boire un Coup: A Collection of Cajun and Creole Drinking Songs compilation, with one song performed by Pine Leaf Boys (2006) Valcour Records
- La Musique (2006) Arhoolie Records
- Blues de Musicien (2007) Arhoolie Records - Grammy Nominated 2007
- Homage Au Passe (2009) Lionsgate Records - Grammy Nominated 2008
- Live at Jazz Festival 2009 (2009) - Grammy Nominated 2009
- Back Home (2010) Valcour Records - Grammy Nominated 2010
- Pine Leaf Boys (2010) Valcour Records
- Danser (2013) Valcour Records

== See also ==
- History of Cajun Music
- List of Notable People Related to Cajun Music
