= David Greely =

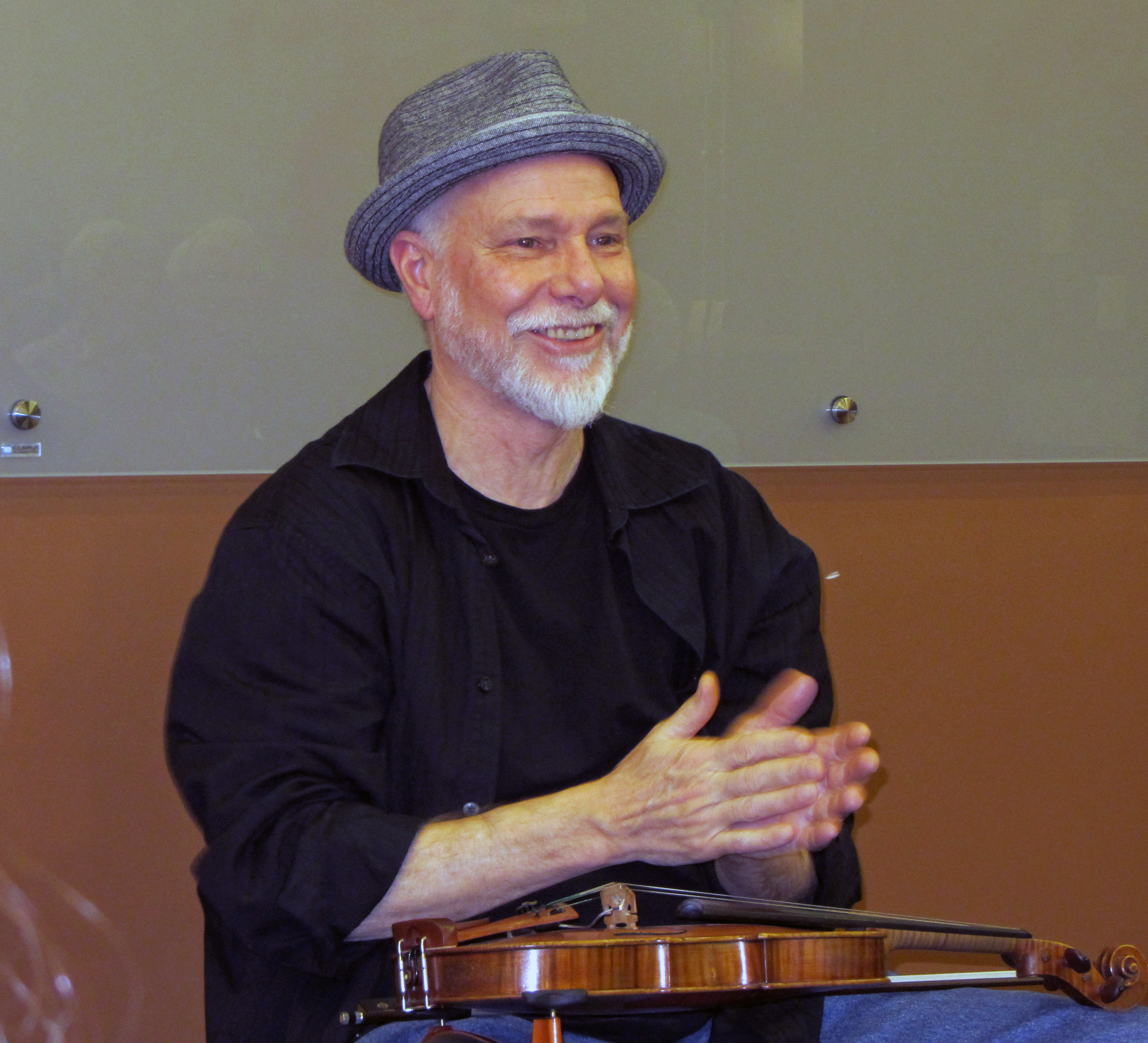
- David Greely promotional image, circa 2012.

Background information
- Born: June 12, 1953 (age 72)
- Genres: Cajun
- Occupation(s): Musician, fiddler
- Instrument: Cajun Fiddle
- Labels: Rounder Records

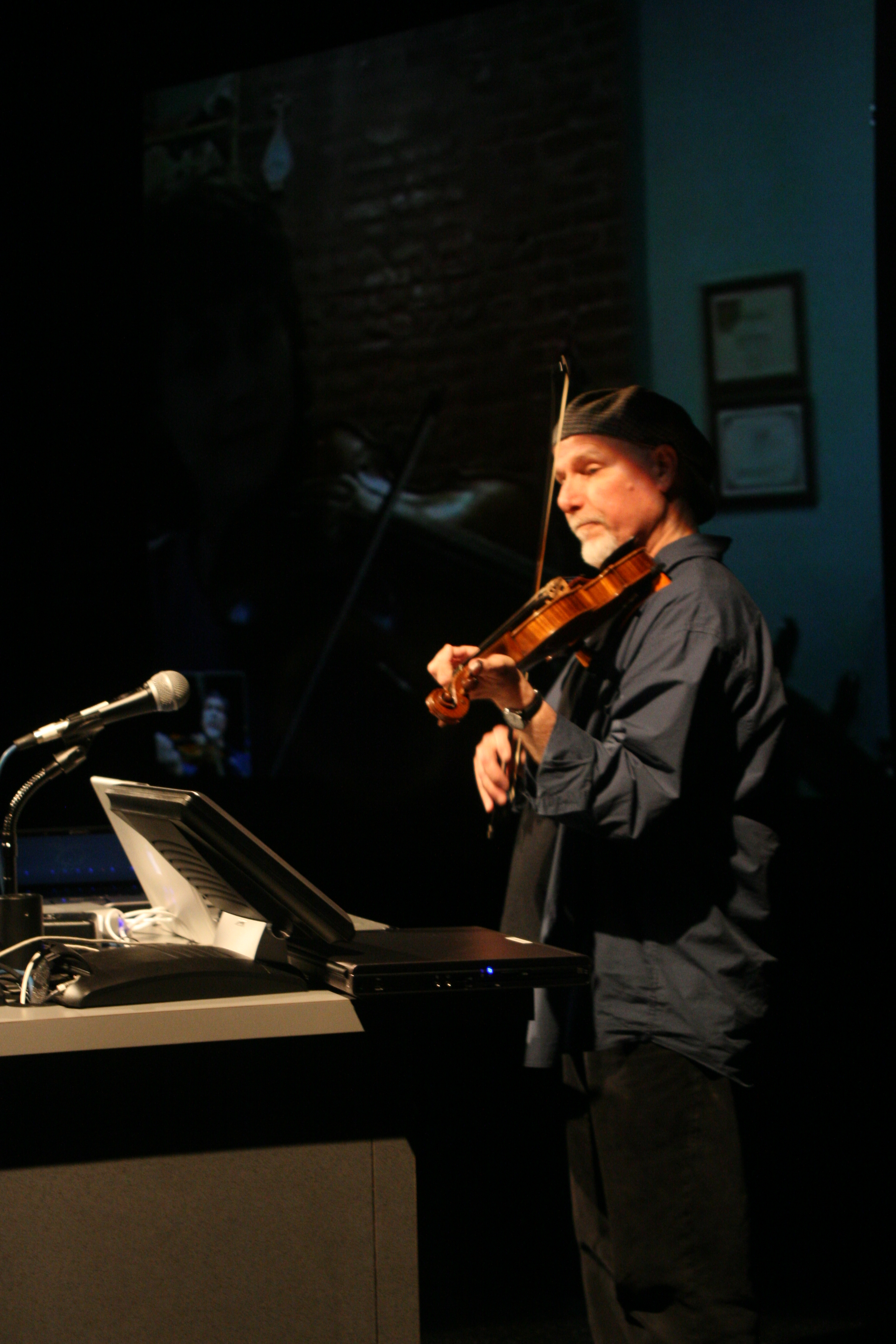

David Greely is an American professional fiddler from south Louisiana.

Greely was born of Irish and Cajun ancestry in Baton Rouge, Louisiana, on June 12, 1953. Raised in Livingston Parish, he began singing for family and friends at age three and sang in choirs and gospel quartets throughout his childhood and adolescence. At age seventeen Greely discovered the fiddle while at a rock concert and purchased his first instrument the next day. His aptitude for the fiddle soon resulted in his invitation to join his first band, Cornbread. The group performed bluegrass and classic country music in Colorado, Louisiana, and Arkansas until 1978.

Greely moved on to Nashville in 1976, where he performed country music in night clubs and recording sessions until 1980, when he relocated to Texas to work in country dance halls. In 1985 he began playing Cajun music on the Riverwalk in San Antonio.

In late 1986 he returned to Louisiana where he performed in restaurants and bars until he met Cajun accordionist Steve Riley, with whom he formed the Mamou Playboys in 1988. With the group, Greely split his time between touring internationally and performing in rural dance halls in south Louisiana.

Greely appeared on albums released by Steve Riley and the Mamou Playboys, including the group's first eponymous album for Rounder Records (1990), followed by Tit Galop Pour Mamou (1992), Trace of Time (1993), Live (1994), La Toussaint (1995), Friday at Last (1996), Bayou Ruler (1998), Happytown (2000), Bon Rêve (2003), Dominos (2005), Live at New Orleans Jazz Fest (2008), and Grand Isle (2011).

As a member of the Mamou Playboys, Greely has been nominated for four Grammy Awards in the Traditional Folk, Zydeco and Cajun, and American Roots categories. In 2004 he received the Louisiana Artist Fellowship in Folklife Performance from the Louisiana Department of the Arts.

Greely released his first solo album, Sud du Sud, in 2009. Since leaving the Mamou Playboys in the spring of 2011, Greely has performed Cajun music worldwide in small acoustic formats, including solo, as well as with the GreelySavoyDuo (with Joel Savoy), GumboJet with Christopher Stafford and Jo Vidrine, and with a Blues/Cajun crossover group called Golden Triangle, with Johnny Nicholas and the Mamou Playboys' Sam Broussard.

Greely is currently an adjunct instructor of Cajun fiddle at University of Louisiana at Lafayette and has taught at various music camps and universities around the world.

== See also ==
- History of Cajun music
- List of people related to Cajun music
