= Black Coffee (Ann Savoy album) =

Studio album by Ann Savoy
- Released: July 6, 2010
- Genre: Traditional Pop Standards, jazz, blues
- Length: 43:51
- Label: Memphis Records
- Producer: Ann Savoy, Joel Savoy

Ann Savoy chronology
If Dreams Come True (2007)	Black Coffee (2010)

Black Coffee is the second album by American singer and musician Ann Savoy, released in 2010. It is credited to Ann Savoy & Her Sleepless Knights.

== Reception ==
Professional ratings
Review scores
Source	Rating
Allmusic	3.5/5 stars

Allmusic critic William Ruhlman recalled similarities to Quintette du Hot Club de France with Django Reinhardt and Stéphane Grappelli, calling the album "quite pleasant, if in a distinctly retro manner."

== Track listing ==
1. "I Cried for You" (Gus Arnheim, Arthur Freed, Abe Lyman) – 3:35
2. "Whoa Tilly, Take Your Time" (Stuart Balcom, Henry Creamer, John Henry, Turner Layton, Bessie Smith, C. Smith) – 3:03
3. "Nuages" (Django Reinhardt) – 2:56
4. "Black Coffee" (Al Goodhart, Al Hoffman, Maurice Sigler) – 3:56
5. "If It Ain't Love" (Fats Waller, Andy Razaf, Don Redman) – 3:30
6. "You've Been a Good Ole Wagon" (Stuart Balcom, John Henry, Bessie Smith, C. Smith) – 2:45
7. "My Funny Valentine" (Richard Rodgers, Lorenz Hart) – 4:21
8. "Cette Chanson Est Pour Vous" (Fred Alhert, Joseph Young) – 4:05
9. "If You Were Mine" (Matty Malneck, Johnny Mercer) – 3:50
10. "New Orleans Blues" (Blue Lu Barker) – 3:20
11. "Embraceable You" (George Gershwin, Ira Gershwin) – 4:19
12. "J'attendrai" (Dino Olivieri, Louis Poterat, Nino Rastelli) – 4:11

== Personnel ==
- Ann Savoy – vocals
- Glenn Fields – drums
- Eric Frey – upright bass
- Chas Justus – guitar
- Tom Mitchell – guitar
- Kevin Wimmer – fiddle

Production notes:

- Ann Savoy – producer, photography
- Joel Savoy – producer, engineer, mixing
- Brad Blackwood – mastering
- Brooke Barnett – cover design
- Gabrielle Savoy – photography
