= Joel Savoy =

American Cajun musician and music producer

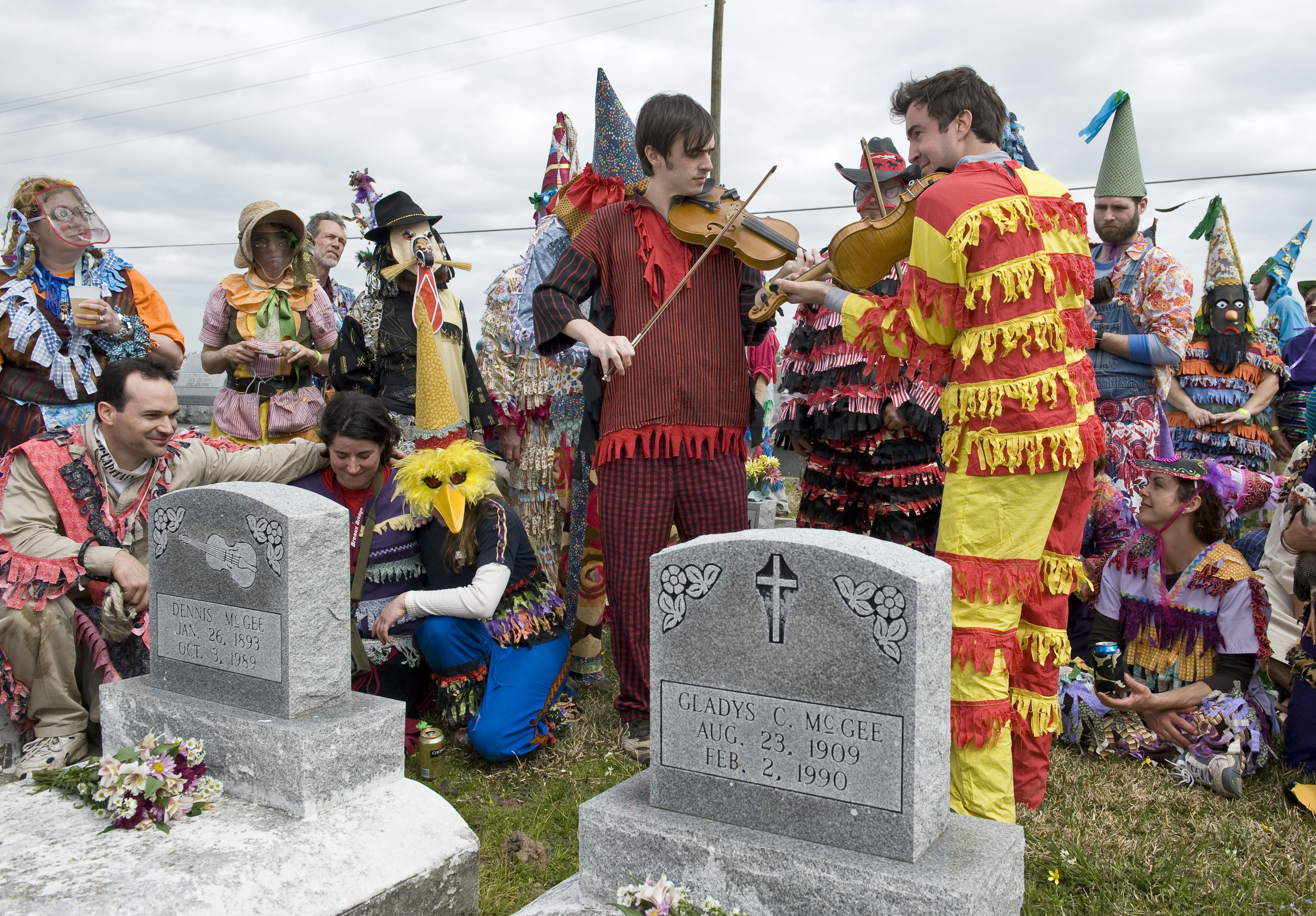
- Savoy (red and yellow costume) playing at the grave of Dennis McGee, at the 2009 Faquetigue Courir

Background information
- Origin: Eunice, Louisiana, United States
- Genres: Folk, Cajun
- Occupation(s): Musician, accordion builder, cofounder of Valcour Records
- Instrument: Fiddle
- Years active: 1999–present
- Website: http://www.joelsavoy.com

Joel Savoy (born in Eunice, Louisiana, USA) is a Cajun musician and music producer from Southwest Louisiana. His father Marc Savoy, famous accordion builder and musician, and his mother, Ann Savoy, author and music producer, are well known ambassadors and supporters of preserving the Cajun culture.

== History ==
Joel Savoy was born in Eunice. In 1995 many of his childhood experiences with the traditional Cajun Courir de Mardi Gras were included in the children's book Mardi Gras: a Cajun Country Celebration written by Diane Hoyt-Goldsmith and Lawrence Migdale. He is a member of the Savoy Family Band along with his father Marc, mother Ann, and brother Wilson Savoy.

In 1999 Joel Savoy co-founded the Red Stick Ramblers from Baton Rouge, Louisiana. In 2006 he started the annual Faquetaigue Courir de Mardi Gras as an alternative to the main Eunice courir event. The run has become one of the most musically based versions of the traditional event. Also in 2006 he founded Valcour Records, an independent record label based in Eunice, Louisiana, with friends Phillip LaFargue II and Lucius Fontenot. Valcour Records' first release was Goin' Down to Louisiana (2006) by fiddle player Cedric Watson and accordionist Corey Ledet.

During the 2007 Cajun French Music Association's Le Cajun ceremony at Lafayette's Blackham Coliseum, Joel Savoy garnered the "2007 Fiddler of the Year" award. In 2008 he played on, recorded and produced his mother's album If Dreams Come True at his Studio Savoy Faire. His brother Wilson and several members of the Red Stick Ramblers also played on the album of Django Reinhardt-style blues and jazz standards as "Ann Savoy and her Sleepless Knights".

Joel Savoy had played and performed with his ex-wife and fellow fiddler, Kelli Jones. The couple released a four-song EP in 2018.

== Discography (partial) ==
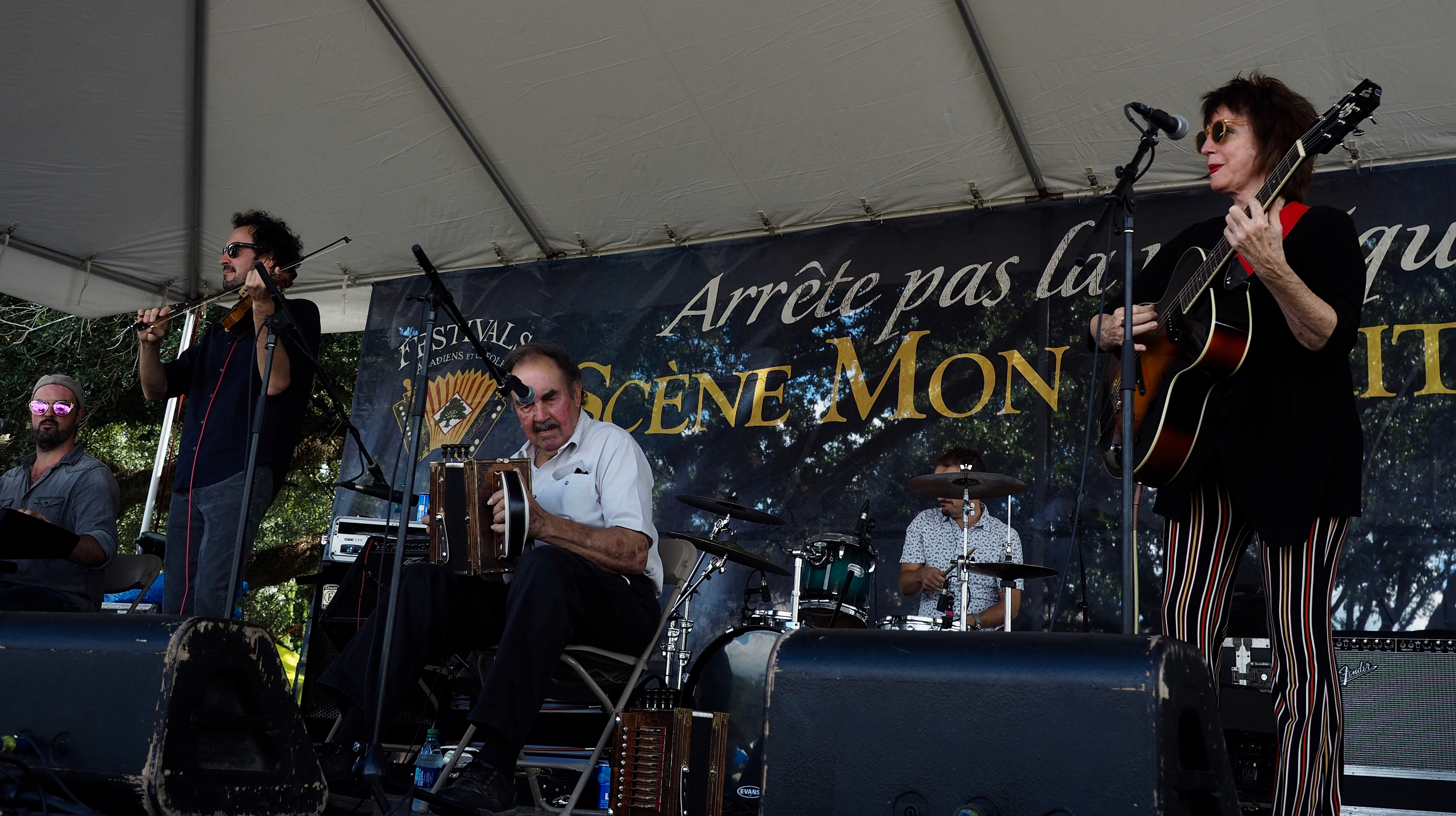
The Savoy Family Band, with Joel on fiddle, performing at Festivals Acadiens et Creoles, October 2018

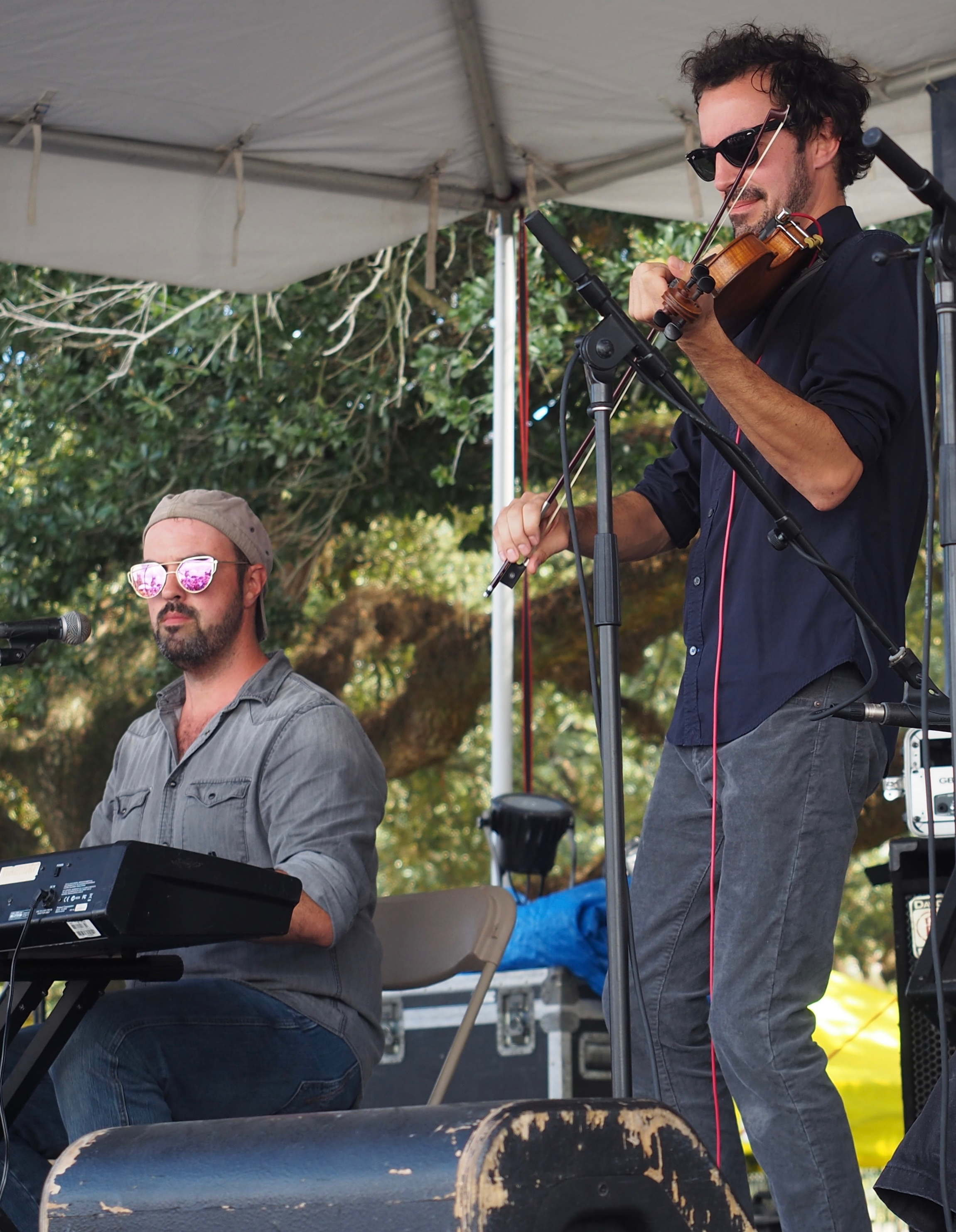
Wilson (left) and Joel (right) Savoy, October 2018.

- Linzay Young & Joel Savoy - Linzay Young & Joel Savoy (2008) Valcour Records
- Joel Savoy's Honky Tonk Merry-Go-Round (2013) Valcour Records
- Toi, Tu Joues à L’amour - Kelli Jones and Joel Savoy (2018) Valcour Records

=== With others ===
- Allons Boire un Coup: A Collection of Cajun and Creole Drinking Songs - Various artists (2006) Valcour Records
- If Dreams Come True - Ann Savoy & Her Sleepless Knights (2007) Memphis Records
- Cedric Watson - Cedric Watson (2008) Valcour Records
- The Cajun Country Revival: The Right Combination Jesse Lége, Joel Savoy, Caleb Klauder, and others (2011) Valcour Records
- The Cajun Country Revival: Greetings from Louisiana Jesse Lége, Joel Savoy, Caleb Klauder, and others (2014) Valcour Records
- I Wanna Sing Right: Rediscovering Lomax in the Evangeline Country four-EP set - various artists (2015) Valcour Records
- Sabra & the Get Rights EP - Sabra & the Get Rights (2016) Valcour Records
- Farewell, Alligator Man: A Tribute to the Music of Jimmy C. Newman - Joel Savoy, Kelli Jones, Caleb Klauder, and Reeb Willms (2019?) Valcour Records

=== See also ===
- Red Stick Ramblers
- Savoy Family Band

== See also ==
- History of Cajun Music
- List of Notable People Related to Cajun Music
