= The Red Stick Ramblers =

1999–2013 Cajun music and western swing band

Red Stick Ramblers
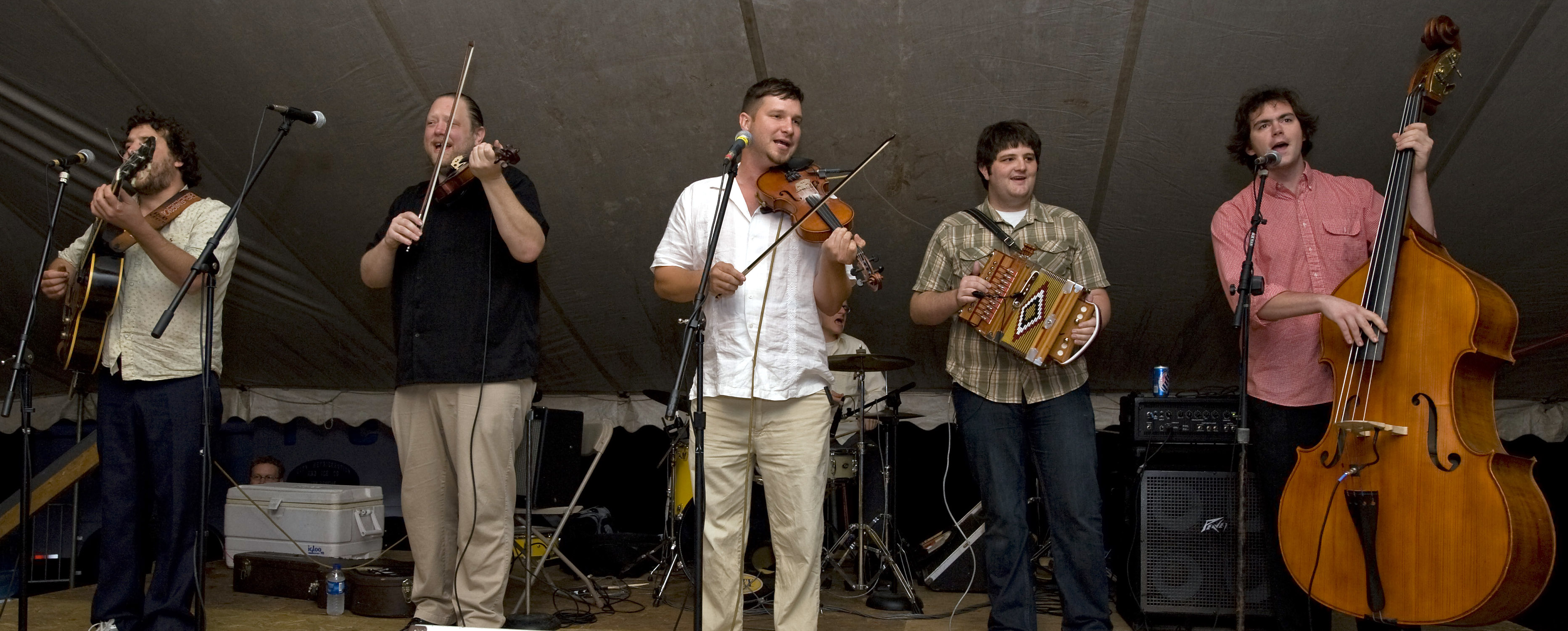
- Red Stick Ramblers performing April 20, 2008, during the Dewey Balfa Cajun and Creole Heritage Week at Chicot State Park.

Background information
- Origin: Louisiana, United States
- Genres: Cajun, Western Swing
- Members: Linzay Young; Daniel Coolik; Chas Justus; Eric Frey; Glenn Fields; Blake Miller
- Past members: Josh Caffery; Joel Savoy; Richard Burgess; Ricky Rees; Kevin Wimmer

The Red Stick Ramblers were a Cajun Music and Western Swing band formed in Baton Rouge, Louisiana in 1999 while some of the members were attending Louisiana State University. Their name comes from a translation of Baton Rouge, which means "red stick" in French. The most recent line-up consisted of Linzay Young (fiddle, lead vocals), Daniel Coolik (fiddle, mandolin, electric guitar), Chas Justus (guitar, vocals), Eric Frey (Upright Bass, Vocals), Blake Miller (accordion and acoustic guitar) and Glenn Fields (drums). Past members include Josh Caffery, Joel Savoy, Oliver Swain, Kevin Wimmer, Wilson Savoy and Ricky Rees.

The band played a combination of traditional Cajun songs (sung in Cajun French), as well as covers of Western Swing classics (particularly the songs of Bob Wills), early American jazz and blues covers (Stuff Smith, Count Basie, Fats Waller and more), and honky tonk and dance-hall music, as well as dozens of tradition-inspired original songs.

The Red Stick Ramblers have appeared in a season finale of the Travel Channel's "No Reservations", with chef Anthony Bourdain, entitled "Cajun Country". Following this appearance the band scored a role in the third season of HBO's Treme, starring as Lucia Micarelli's character Annie's band the "Bayou St. John Playboys" and later "Annie T's Bayou Cadillac." Three Red Stick Rambler original songs, Made in the Shade, Katrina, and Morning Blues, are featured in season three of Treme. The band also returned to appear in the final abbreviated 4th season of Treme.

The rhythm section of the Ramblers performed as the backing band on several tracks of Linda Ronstadt and Ann Savoy's 2007 release Adieu False Heart.

On 26 October 2013 at the Black Pot Festival in Lafayette, LA, a festival started by the Red Stick Ramblers in 2006, the band announced that this would be their last show as The Red Stick Ramblers. 5/6th of the members of the most recent personnel of the band have gone on to form The Revelers, which is currently active.

== Discography ==
- The Red Stick Ramblers (2001) - Louisiana Radio Records (currently unavailable)
- Bring it on Down (2003) - Memphis International Records
- Right Key, Wrong Keyhole (2005) - Memphis International Records
- Allons Boire un Coup: A Collection of Cajun and Creole Drinking Songs Various (2006) Valcour Records
- The Red Stick Ramblers EP (2007) - Sugar Hill Records
- Red Stick Ramblers limited edition EP (2007) - Sugar Hill Records (unavailable)
- Made in the Shade (2007) - Sugar Hill Records
- My Suitcase is Always Packed (2009) - Sugar Hill Records
