= Dirk Powell =

American musician

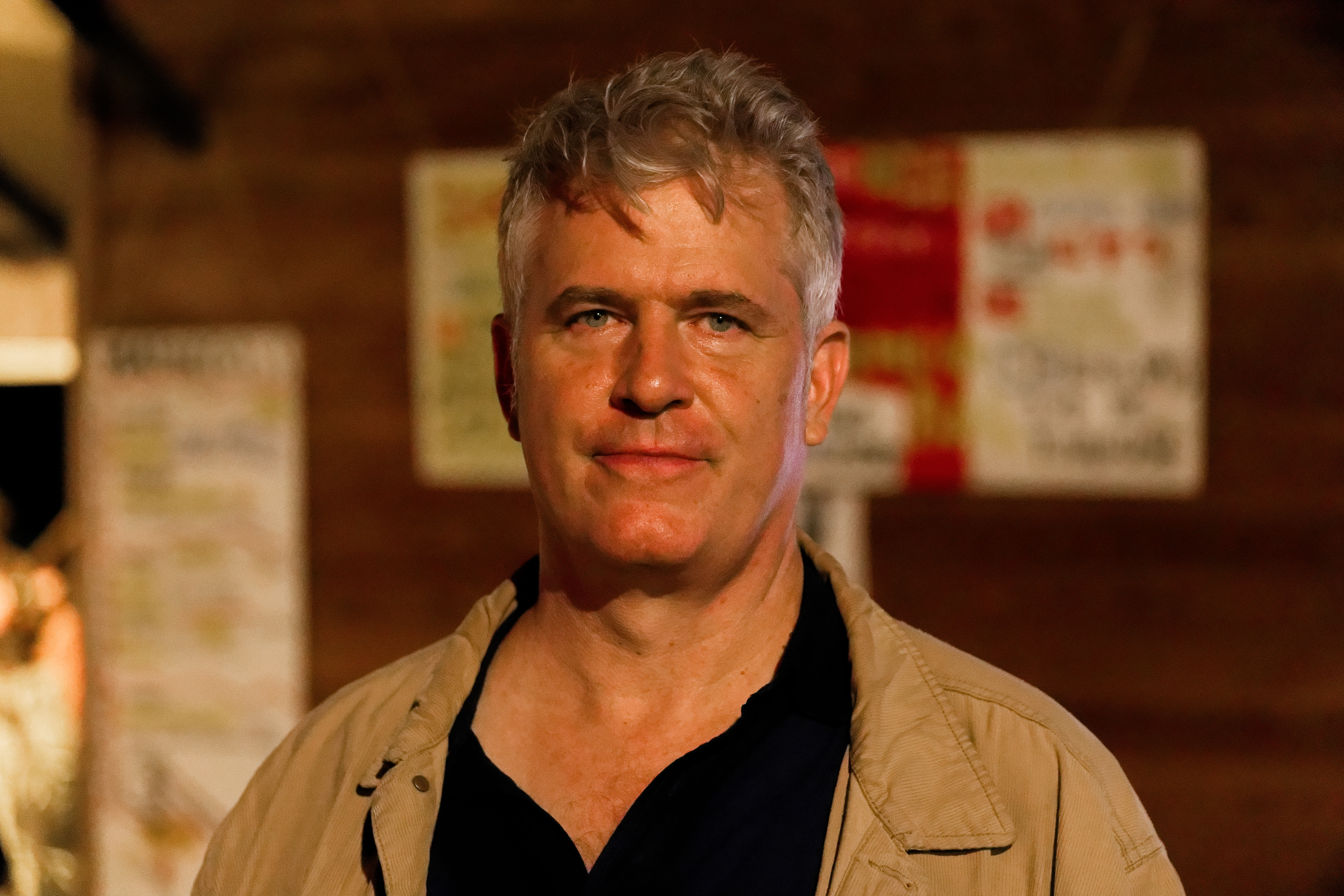

Background information
- Born: June 7, 1969 (age 57); Oberlin (Ohio, USA)
- Instruments: fiddler, banjo player, singer
- Award: four Grammy awards

Dirk Powell (born June 7, 1969) is an American fiddler, banjo player, and singer. He was born in Oberlin southwest of Elyria, Ohio into a family with deep Kentucky roots. He has lived in Louisiana since 1992. He is considered one of the world's leading experts on traditional Appalachian fiddle and banjo styles. Powell is also a recording engineer, producer, and owns a studio, the Cypress House, in Breaux Bridge near Lafayette, Louisiana. The studio is in a converted 1850s Louisiana Creole home on Bayou Teche and focuses on vintage gear and audio..

Powell has won four Grammy Awards and has been a guest on television shows including Late Night with David Letterman, the Today Show, and American Masters. For ten years, he was Joan Baez's "band." He was a longtime member of the Cajun band Balfa Toujours. He performs as a solo artist, as a featured artist with Transatlantic Sessions, on tour with Mary Chapin Carpenter, and as a duo with Rainy Eyes. Powell has recorded with Rhiannon Giddens, Loretta Lynn, Irma Thomas, Tim O'Brien, the Raconteurs on their record Consolers of the Lonely, and Eric Clapton.

Powell has scored and worked on numerous films including Cold Mountain, In the Electric Mist, Stevie, and Ride with the Devil. He collaborated on the score for Sundance award-winning documentary, Descendant.

== Discography ==
- If I Go Ten Thousand Miles (Rounder, 1996)
- Songs from the Mountain (Howdy Skies, 1999) - Dirk Powell, Tim O'Brien & John Herrmann
- Tony Furtado & Dirk Powell (Rounder, 1999)
- Hand Me Down (Rounder, 1999)
- Time Again (Rounder, 2004)
- A Fret Free Christmas (Valcour Records, 2010)
- Walking Through Clay (Sugar Hill/Welk Music Group, 2014)
- I Wanna Sing Right: Rediscovering Lomax in the Evangeline Country four-EP set - various artists (Valcour Records, 2015)
- Cajun Accordion Kings (and the Queen) various artists (Valcour Records, 2015)
- When I Wait for You (Vertical Records, 2020)
- Wake (The Last Music Company, 2026)
