= Valcour Records =

- Founded: 2006
- Founder: Joel Savoy; Phillip LaFargue II; Lucius Fontenot
- Distributor(s): Select-O-Hits
- Genre: Indie, folk, Americana, Cajun, zydeco
- Country of origin: U.S.
- Location: Eunice, Louisiana
- Official website: valcourrecords.com

Valcour Records is an independent record label based in Eunice, Louisiana. Valcour was founded in 2006 by Joel Savoy (son of Marc and Ann Savoy), with friends Phillip LaFargue II and Lucius Fontenot. Valcour Records' first release in 2006 was Goin' Down to Louisiana by fiddle player Cedric Watson and accordionist Corey Ledet.

Valcour has since released albums with Louisiana bands such as the Figs, Bonsoir Catin, GIVERS, and Feufollet. Through the Cajun and Creole drinking songs compilation Allons Boire un Coup (2007), the label has also featured the Pine Leaf Boys, Ann Savoy, Steve Riley and Racines, The Red Stick Ramblers, the Lost Bayou Ramblers, and Balfa heir Courtney Granger.

In 2007, Valcour partnered with independent distributor Select-O-Hits for nationwide distribution.

== See also ==
- List of record labels
- Music of Louisiana
- Cajun Music
- List of people related to Cajun music
- History of Cajun music
- Louisiana
