= Steve Riley and the Mamou Playboys =

American Cajun band

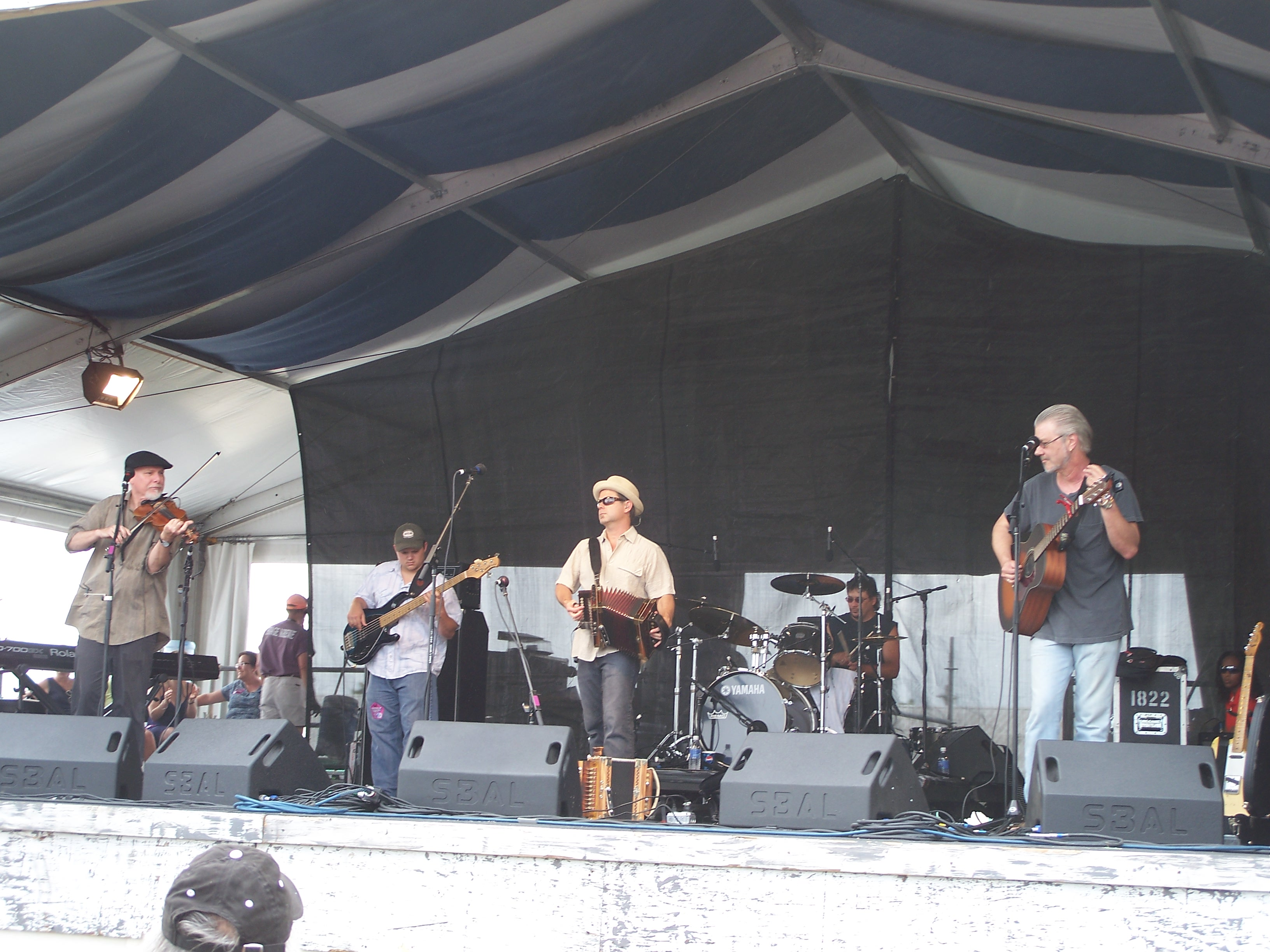
- Steve Riley and the Mamou Playboys perform at the New Orleans Jazz & Heritage Festival, April 2009.

Background information
- Origin: Louisiana, United States
- Years active: 1988–present
- Label: Rounder Records
- Members: Steve Riley; David Greely; Sam Broussard; Burke Riley; Philippe Billeaudeaux
- Past members: Jimmy Domengeaux; David Greely; Peter Schwarz; Kevin Wimmer
- Website: Mamouplayboys.com

Steve Riley and the Mamou Playboys are an American Cajun band from southern Louisiana. The band formed in 1988 and has since recorded 10 albums, nine of which are on Rounder Records.

The band includes Steve Riley (accordion, b. 1969), David Greely (fiddle), Sam Broussard (guitar), Burke Riley (drums/guitar) and Philippe Billeaudeaux (bass) and formerly Jimmy Domengeaux (guitar) before his death in 1999. Kevin Wimmer (fiddle) joined the band in 2011. Riley is a native of Mamou, Louisiana and a cousin of the noted Cajun musician and accordion builder Marc Savoy.

== History ==
Steve Riley and the Mamou Playboys was founded in 1988 by Steve Riley and David Greely. Since then, they have released 18 albums, including live albums and holiday specials, almost exclusively in Cajun French. Their style has grown from exclusively traditional music of Riley's mentors Dewey Balfa, Belton Richard, and Walter Mouton, to a more personal style that still has a distinctively Cajun sound.

They released a 'Best of' compilation album in 2008, which featured some of their greatest hits.

David Greely retired from the band due to hearing problems. His last performance was the 2011 Mardi Gras dance in Eunice, Louisiana. In June 2022, David Greely was back playing with the band.

== Awards ==
Steve Riley and the Mamou Playboys have been nominated for two Grammy Awards in the Best Traditional Folk Album category, one Grammy nomination was for Trace of Time for Best Traditional Folk Album, and the second was for Bon Rêve in 2004.

== Discography ==
- Grand Isle (2011)
- Dominos (2005)
- Bon Rêve (2003)
- Happytown (2001)
- Bayou Ruler (1998)
- Friday at Last (1997)
- La Toussaint (1995)
- Live! (1994)
- Trace of Time (1993)
- Tit Galop Pour Mamou (1992)
- Steve Riley & The Mamou Playboys (1990)

=== Compilations ===
- En Francais: Cajun 'n' Creole Rock 'n' Roll Various, produced by Louis Michot of Lost Bayou Ramblers (2011) Bayou Teche Brewers/CD Baby
- Steve Riley in the group Racines: Allons Boire un Coup: A Collection of Cajun and Creole Drinking Songs Various artists (2006) Valcour Records

=== Steve Riley on others' recordings ===
- Been to Town and Back Again - Christopher Shaw (1994)
- Transatlantic Sessions: Songs of Death, Divorce, Drinking and Dancing Cajun Roosters (2011) Whoopee Records-Pine Groove Sound/CD Baby
- Evangeline Made: A Tribute to Cajun Music Various artists (2002) Vanguard Records

== See also ==
- History of Cajun Music
- List of Notable People Related to Cajun Music
