= Dewey Balfa =

American Cajun fiddler and singer

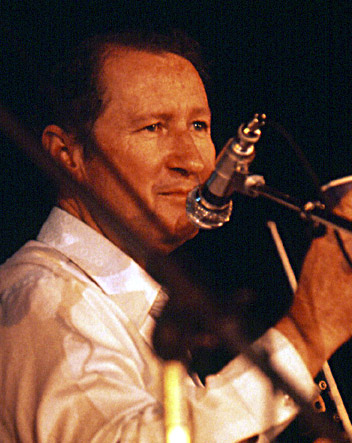
- Balfa performing in 1977

Background information
- Born: March 20, 1927; Grand Louis, Louisiana, U.S.
- Died: June 17, 1992 (aged 65) Eunice, Louisiana, U.S.
- Genres: Folk, Cajun
- Occupation: Musician
- Instrument: Fiddle
- Years active: 1948–1992
- Labels: Swallow, Arhoolie, Folkways, Rounder, Sonet
- Formerly of: The Balfa Brothers

Dewey Balfa (March 20, 1927 – June 17, 1992) was an American Cajun fiddler and singer who contributed significantly to the popularity of Cajun music. Balfa was born near Mamou, Louisiana. He is perhaps best known for his 1964 performance at the Newport Folk Festival with Gladius Thibodeaux and Vinus LeJeune, where the group received an enthusiastic response from over seventeen thousand audience members. He sang the song "Parlez Nous à Boire" in the 1981 cult film Southern Comfort, in which he had a small role.

== Early life ==
Dewey Balfa was born in Grand Louis, Louisiana, a small community west of Mamou. He was the son of Amay (née Ardoin) and Charles Balfa who were sharecroppers. Balfa had learned most of his songs from his grandmother and father who was a fiddle player.

== Musical career ==
During World War II, Balfa worked in a shipyard in Orange, Texas. After returning in 1948, he and his brothers Will and Rodney formed the Musical Brothers. In 1965, he formed The Balfa Brothers after an enthusiastic response from a performance at the Newport Folk Festival. This led to their first LP, produced by Swallow Records.

== Family ==
Balfa married Hilda Frugé when he was 22 in 1949. They had five children together: Nelda, Roberta, Norma, Dewey Jr., and Christine, many of whom became musicians. Christine founded the band Balfa Toujours to continue the family tradition.

== Popularization of Cajun music ==
Balfa appears in a documentary film entitled Les Blues de Balfa produced by Yasha Aginsky. In one scene, Balfa is shown with Nathan Abshire entertaining a group of school children. Balfa gives a short lecture concerning the origins of Cajun music:

We are here to tell you a little bit about what a Cajun is. A Cajun is a person who his homeland was France. Went into Nova Scotia, at the time Acadia, and settled there and was there for about a hundred years, and afterwards the British took over the territory and then the French-speaking people, the French descendants, known as the Acadians, came down to the South-Western part of Louisiana, and that was back in 1755. So over all of these years, your language, and your music has been preserved from daddy to son or daddy to daughter or momma to daughter.

== Musical samples ==
- J'ai Passé devant ta Porte Listen
- Jolie Blonde Listen

== Selected discography ==
- 1976: Traditional Cajun Fiddle: Instruction (Smithsonian Folkways)
- 1977: Cajun Fiddle, Old and New: Instruction (Smithsonian Folkways)
- 1984: Les Quatre Vieux Garçons (Smithsonian Folkways)
- 1986: Dewey Balfa and Friends: Fait A La Main! (Handmade) / Spicy Traditional Instrumental Cajun Classics! (Swallow Records LP-6063)
- 1993: Folk Masters: Great Performances Recorded Live at the Barns of Wolf Trap (Smithsonian Folkways)
- 2012: The Balfa Family: A Retrospective - Festivals Acadiens et Créoles 1977-2010 (2012, Valcour Records)

== Selected filmography ==
- 1972: Spend It All by Les Blank
- 1974: Dedans le sud de la Louisiane by Jean-Pierre Bruneau
- 1983: Les Blues de Balfa by Yasha Aginsky

== Awards and honors ==
Balfa was a recipient of a 1982 National Heritage Fellowship awarded by the National Endowment for the Arts, which is the United States government's highest honor in the folk and traditional arts. That year's fellowships were the first bestowed by the NEA.

== See also ==
- The Balfa Brothers
- List of Cajun musicians
- History of Cajun music
