= Ann Savoy =

American musician, author, and record producer

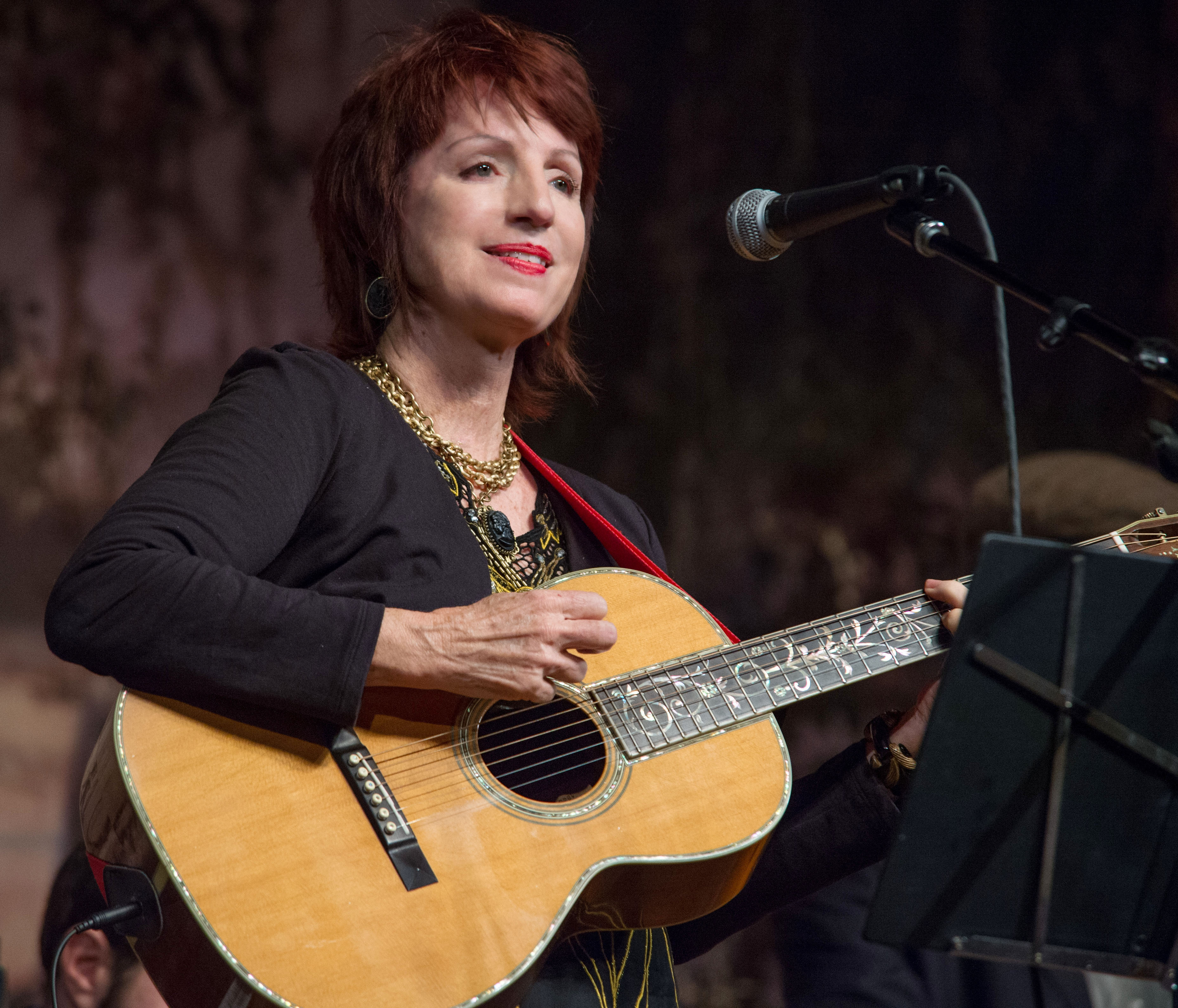
- Savoy performing at the Liberty Theater in Eunice, Louisiana, November 2012

Background information
- Birth name: Ann Allen
- Born: January 20, 1952 (age 73); St. Louis, Missouri, U.S.
- Origin: Richmond, Virginia, U.S.
- Genres: Cajun; folk
- Occupations: Singer-songwriter; musician; record producer; actress
- Instruments: Vocals; guitar; Cajun accordion; Cajun fiddle
- Years active: 1980–present
- Labels: Vanguard; Arhoolie; Rounder; Memphis
- Spouse: Marc Savoy
- Website: annsavoy.com

Ann Savoy (/sɑːˈvwɑː/ sah-VWAH; née Allen; born January 20, 1952) is a musician, author, and record producer.

== Biography ==
Savoy was born in St. Louis, Missouri and raised in Richmond, Virginia. She resides with her husband Marc Savoy and family in Eunice, Southern Louisiana.

As a musician, she performs with her husband accordionist Marc Savoy and fiddler Michael Doucet in the Savoy Doucet Cajun Band. She also has an all-woman band The Magnolia Sisters. She also performs with husband Marc and their sons, Joel and Wilson, in the Savoy Family Band. Most recently, she has put together a Django Reinhardt-style swing band called Ann Savoy and her Sleepless Knights.

Savoy appeared as a musician in the film Divine Secrets of the Ya-Ya Sisterhood and was the associate music director of the film All The King's Men, working on this project with T Bone Burnett. She has appeared in many documentaries on the subject of Cajun music including a Les Blank film, entitled Marc and Ann.

As a record producer she produced, among others, the Grammy Award nominated tribute to Cajun music, Evangeline Made: A Tribute to Cajun Music, featuring singers Linda Ronstadt, John Fogerty, Nick Lowe, herself, and other noted musicians.

She is the editor and compiler of Cajun Music: A Reflection of a People, which chronicles the history of Cajun and Zydeco music. Volume one was published in 1984, and volume two was released in 2021. Savoy had put the project on hold while she raised four children and pursued a music career, but the downtime forced by the COVID-19 pandemic plus the encouragement of her grown children allowed her to complete volume two in 2020. Volume one garnered the American Folklore Society's Botkin Book Award, and the documentary film J'etais au bal was based in part on the book.

She has recorded a number of albums. As The Zozo Sisters, she recorded with Linda Ronstadt the Grammy Award-nominated and Billboard-charting CD Adieu False Heart. That album is notable for being Savoy's first time recording in English.

== Discography ==
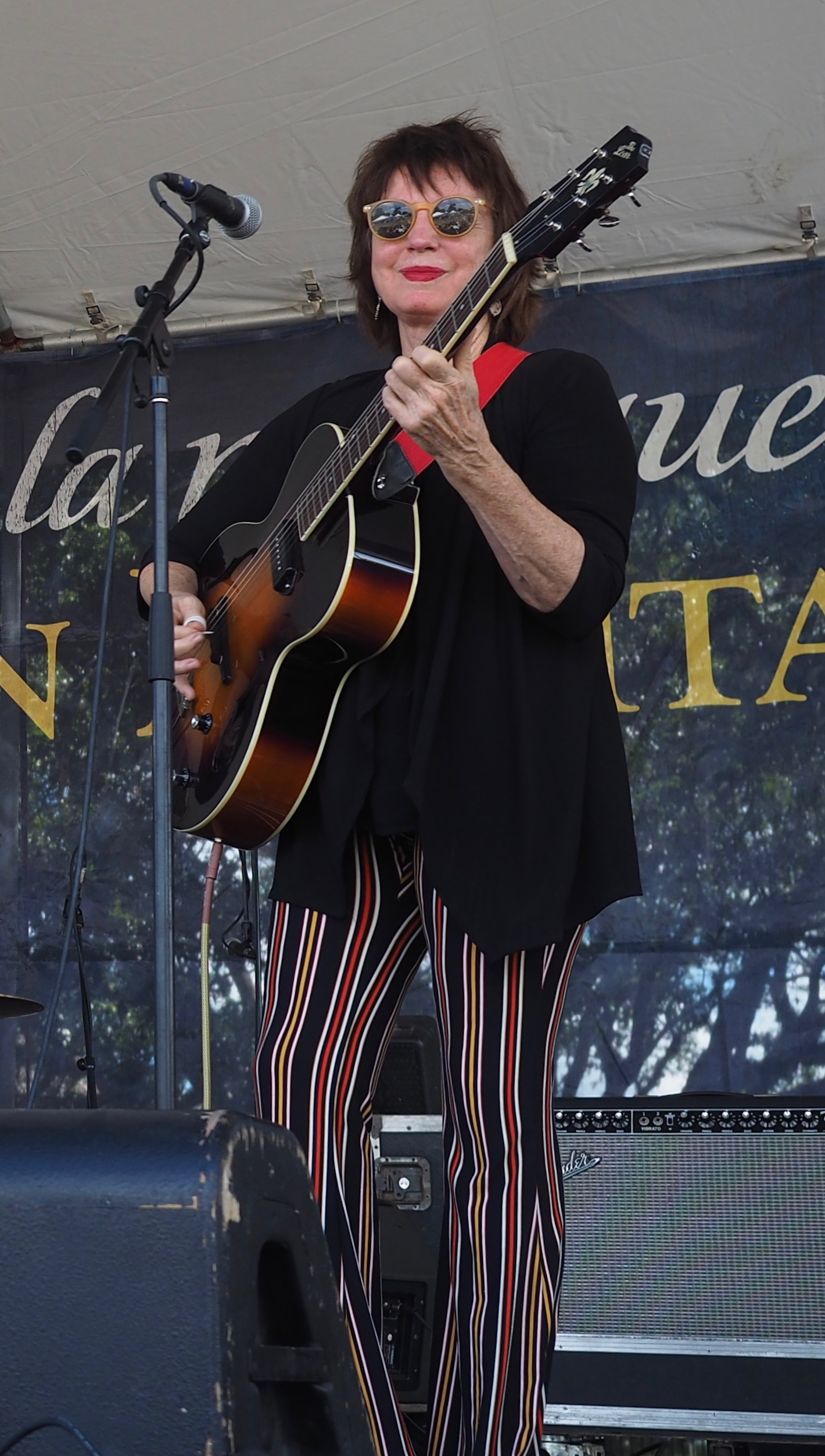
Savoy performing in October 2018

=== Ann Savoy and Her Sleepless Knights ===
- If Dreams Come True (2007) Memphis Records
- Black Coffee (2009) Memphis Records

=== With Savoy Doucet Cajun Band ===
- Home Music with Spirits (1981) Arhoolie Records
- Savoy-Doucet Cajun Band (1984) Arhoolie Records
- With Spirits (1987) Arhoolie Records
- J'ai Ete au Bal: I Went to the Dance various artists (1989) Arhoolie Records
- J'ai Ete au Bal: I Went to the Dance video (DVD); various artists (1989) Arhoolie Records
- Two Step D'Amadé (1993) Arhoolie Records
- Les Harias: Home Music (1993) Arhoolie Records
- Live! (1994) Arhoolie Records
- Cajun Country video (DVD); various artists (1995) Shanachie
- Aly Meets The Cajuns video (DVD); Aly Bain and others (1998) Whirlie Records
- Sam's Big Rooster (2000) Arhoolie Records
- Best of the Savoy Doucet Cajun Band (2002) Arhoolie Records

=== Magnolia Sisters ===
- Prends Courage (1995) Arhoolie Records
- Chers Amis (2000) Rounder Records
- Après Faire Le Boogie Woogie (2004) Rounder
- Stripped Down (2009) Arhoolie Records

=== Savoy Family Band ===
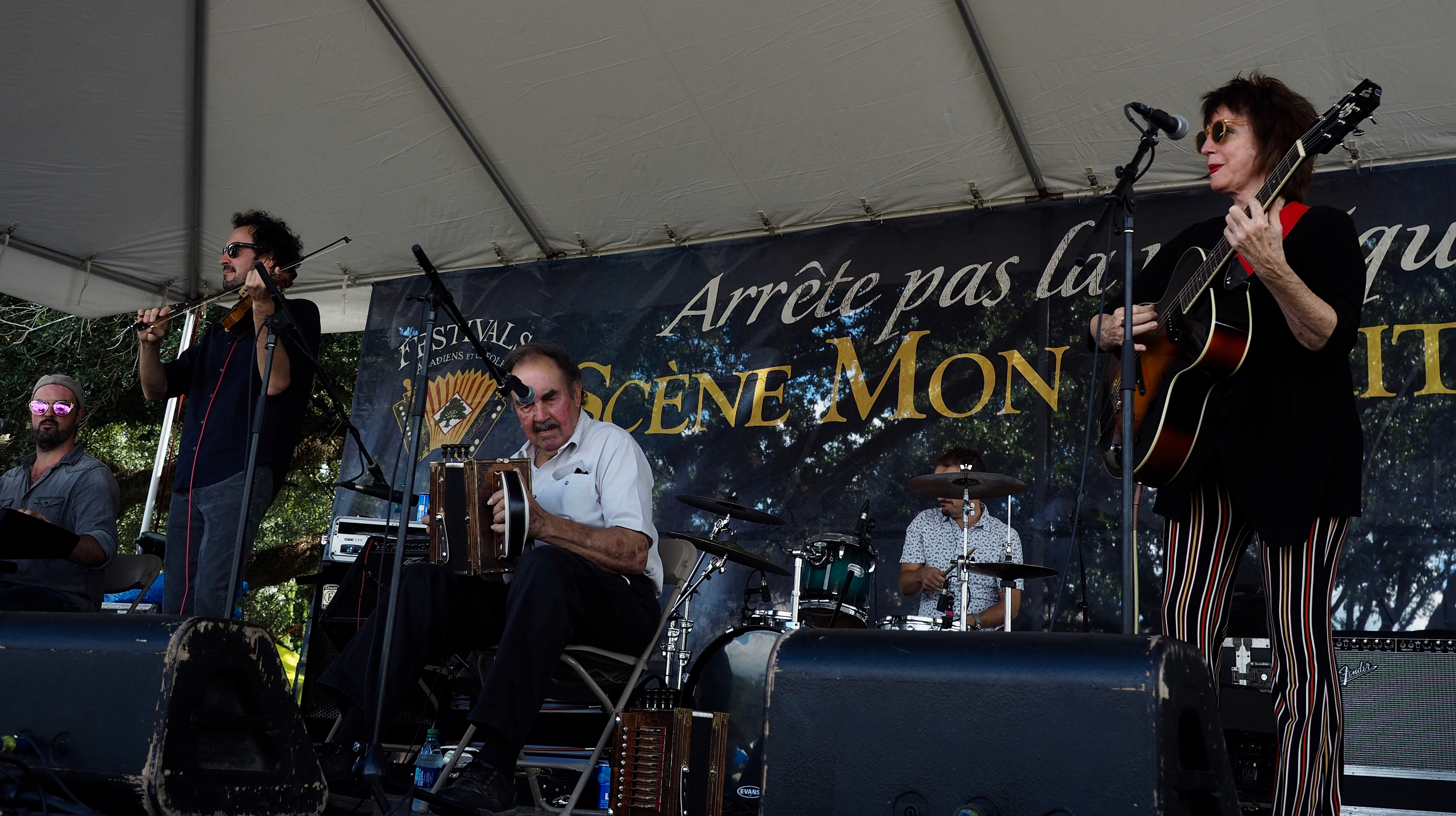
The Savoy Family Band at Festivals Acadiens et Creoles, October 2018

- Savoy Family Album (2003) Arhoolie Records
- Turn Loose But Don't Let Go (2008) Arhoolie Records
- Live at the 2013 New Orleans Jazz & Heritage Festival (2013) New Orleans Jazz Fest

=== With others ===
- The Rough Guide to Cajun & Zydeco Various Artists (1999) World Music Network
- Evangeline Made: A Tribute to Cajun Music Various artists, including and produced by Ann Savoy (2002) Vanguard Records
- Adieu False Heart with Linda Ronstadt as the Zozo Sisters (2006) Vanguard Records
- Allons Boire un Coup: A Collection of Cajun and Creole Drinking Songs Ann and Joel Savoy; Ann Savoy and Jane Vidrine – various artists (2006) Valcour Records
- I Wanna Sing Right: Rediscovering Lomax in the Evangeline Country four-EP set – various artists (2015) Valcour Records
- Fais Do Do: Louisiana Lullabies Ann Savoy and Jane Vidrine (2019) Valcour Records
