= Marc Savoy =

American musician and accordion maker

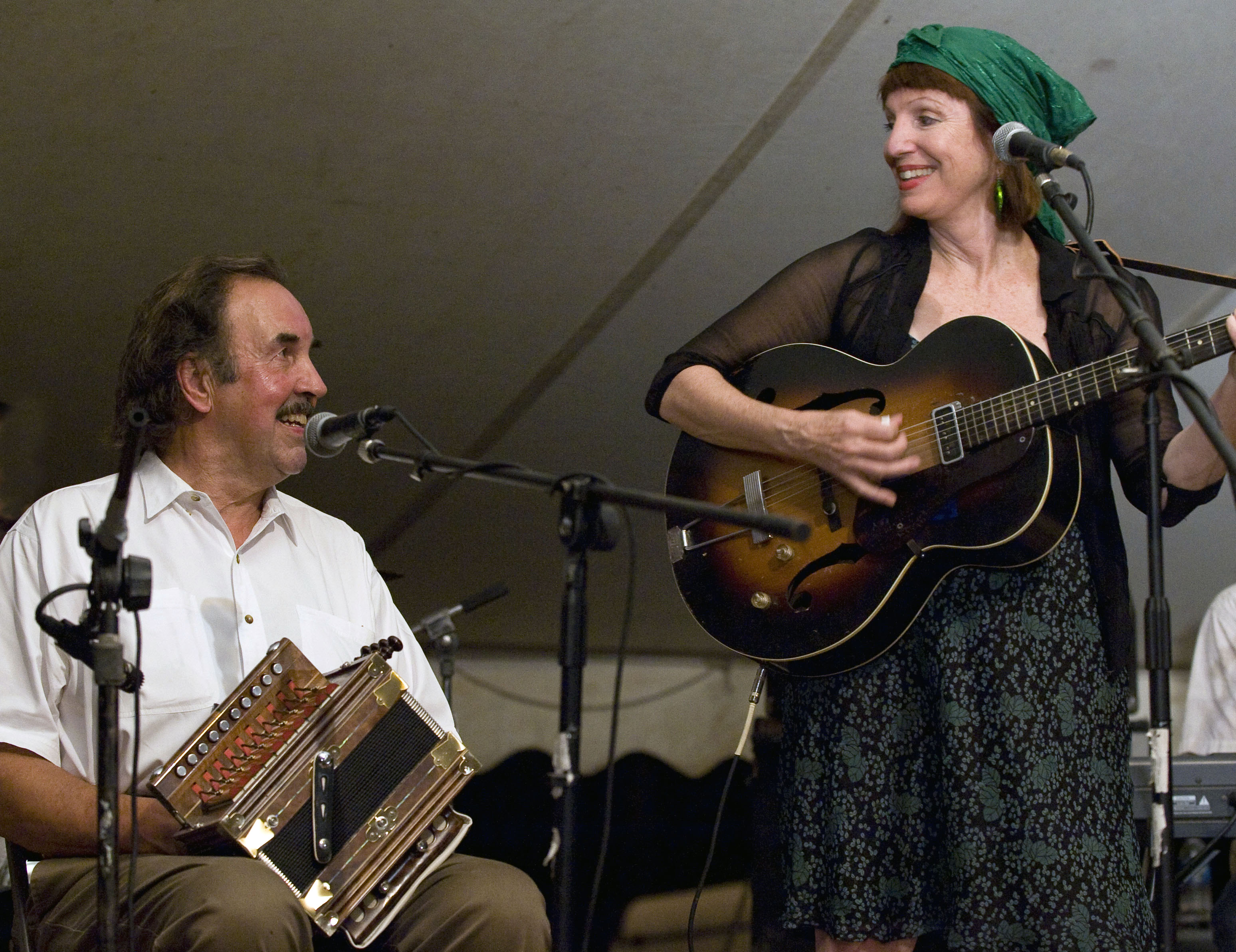
- Marc and Ann Savoy playing at the Balfa Camp in 2009

Background information
- Born: October 1, 1940 (age 85) near Eunice, Louisiana, U.S.
- Genres: Cajun
- Occupations: Accordion maker, accordionist
- Instrument: Cajun accordion
- Label: Arhoolie
- Spouse: Ann Allen
- Website: www.savoymusiccenter.com

Marc Savoy (/sɑːˈvwɑː/ sah-VWAH; born October 1, 1940) is an American musician, and builder and player of the Cajun accordion.

== Early life ==
He was born on his grandfather's rice farm near Eunice, Louisiana. His grandfather was a fiddler, who occasionally played with the legendary Dennis McGee, who was once a tenant farmer on his grandfather's property. Marc Savoy began playing traditional music when he was 12 years old.

== Career ==
Savoy acquired a Sidney Brown accordion as a teenager, and within a few years was interested in making his own. After earning a degree in chemical engineering, in 1966 he went into business full-time as an accordion maker and player, based at his Savoy Music Center in Eunice.

His wife is the singer and guitarist Ann Savoy, whom he met in 1975 and married in 1977. He has performed with Robert Bertrand, Dennis McGee, Rodney Balfa, Sady Courville, Dewey Balfa, D. L. Menard, and Michael Doucet, the latter of whom he plays with in the Savoy-Doucet Band. He also plays in the Savoy Family Band with his wife Ann and their sons Joel and Wilson.

He hosts regular jam sessions and mini-festivals at the Savoy Music Center.

== Awards and honors ==
Savoy is a recipient of a 1992 National Heritage Fellowship awarded by the National Endowment for the Arts, which is the United States government's highest honor in the folk and traditional arts.

== Discography (albums) ==
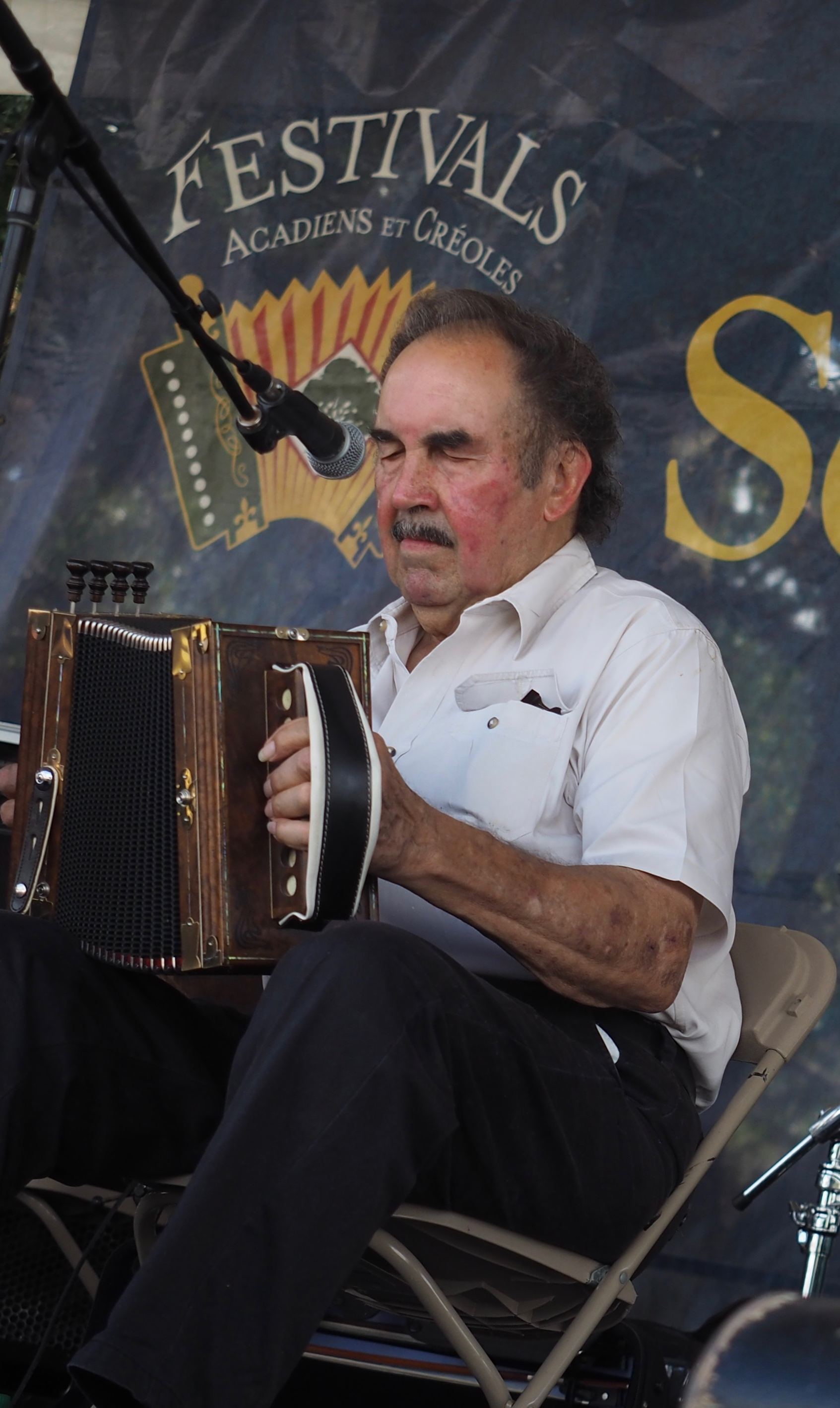
Marc Savoy performing in October 2018

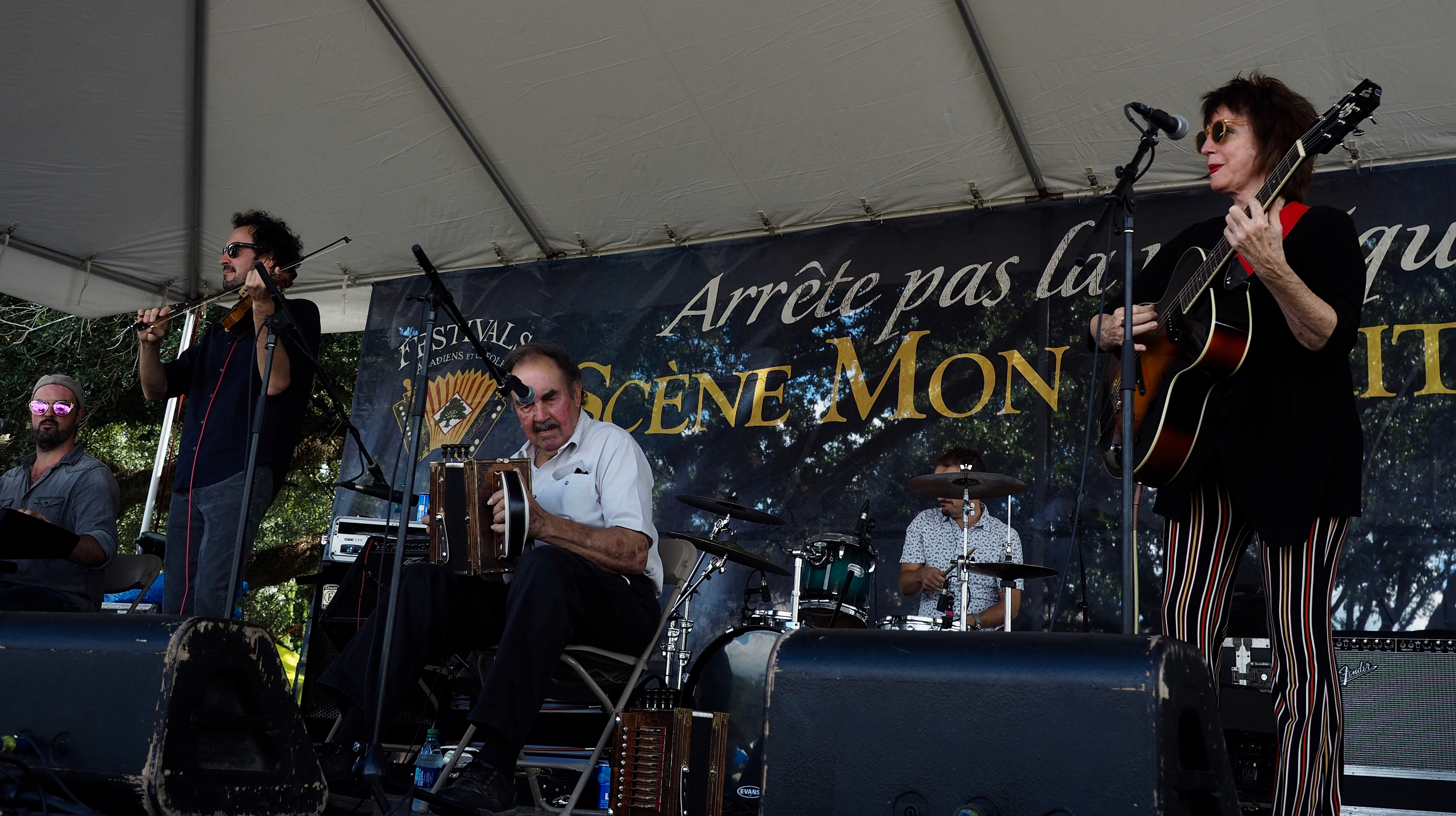
The Savoy Family Band on stage at Festivals Acadiens et Creoles, October 2018

=== As Marc Savoy ===
- 1976: Under a Green Oak Tree (with Dewey Balfa and D.L. Menard) (Arhoolie Records)
- 1981: Oh What a Night (Arhoolie)
- 1998: Made in Louisiana (Voyager)

=== Savoy-Doucet Cajun Band ===
- 1983: Home Music (K7, Arhoolie)
- 1987: With Spirits (K7, Arhoolie)
- 1989: Two-Step d'Amede (Arhoolie)
- 1992: Home Music with Spirits (Arhoolie)
- 1994: Live! At the Dance (Arhoolie)
- 2002: The Best of the Savoy-Doucet Cajun Band compilation (Arhoolie)

=== Savoy Family Band ===
See Savoy Family Band

=== Savoy-Smith Cajun Band ===
- 1996: Now and Then (Arhoolie)

=== With others ===
- 1994: Mike Seeger Third Annual Farewell Reunion - "Savoy Family Waltz" (Seeger on banjo, Savoy on accordion, and Michael Doucet on fiddle) (Rounder)

== Filmography ==
- 1972 - Spend It All
- 1981 - Southern Comfort. Directed by Walter Hill.
- 1989 - J'ai Ete Au Bal (I Went To The Dance). Directed by Les Blank.
- 1990 - Yum Yum Yum! A Taste Of Cajun And Creole Cooking. Directed by Les Blank.
- 1991 - Marc & Ann. Directed by Les Blank.

== See also ==
- History of Cajun music
- List of people related to Cajun music
