= History of Cajun music =

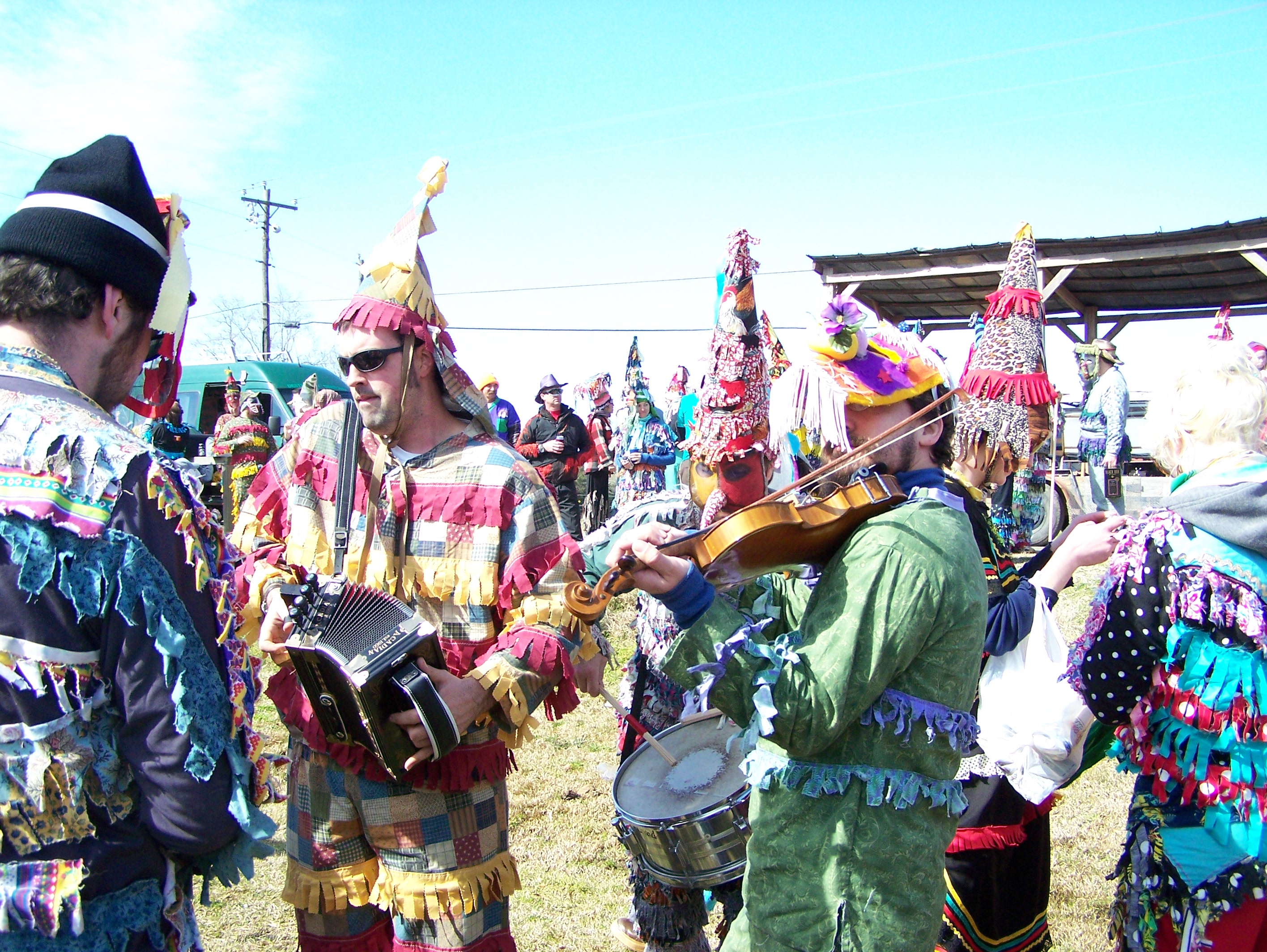
Cajun musicians at a 2010 Courir de Mardi Gras

Cajun music has its roots based in the ballads of the French-speaking Acadians of Canada, and in country music.

== Early years ==
The first form of traditional cajun music began before the 20th century in south Louisiana. When the Acadians came from New Brunswick & Nova Scotia to Louisiana in 1764, they brought with them many beautiful ballads that told stories of bygone years. Many of these songs can be traced back to France and many songs from France drifted to the bayou and the prairie region via Nova Scotia and New Orleans. These ballads are not widely performed today, but were the basis of what is now accepted as cajun music.

In the late 19th century, affordable accordions were introduced into Louisiana and were adopted by both Cajun and Creole musicians. Cajun and Creole musical styles at this time grew in parallel: mostly two-steps and waltzes meant for dancing, played by accordion and fiddle.

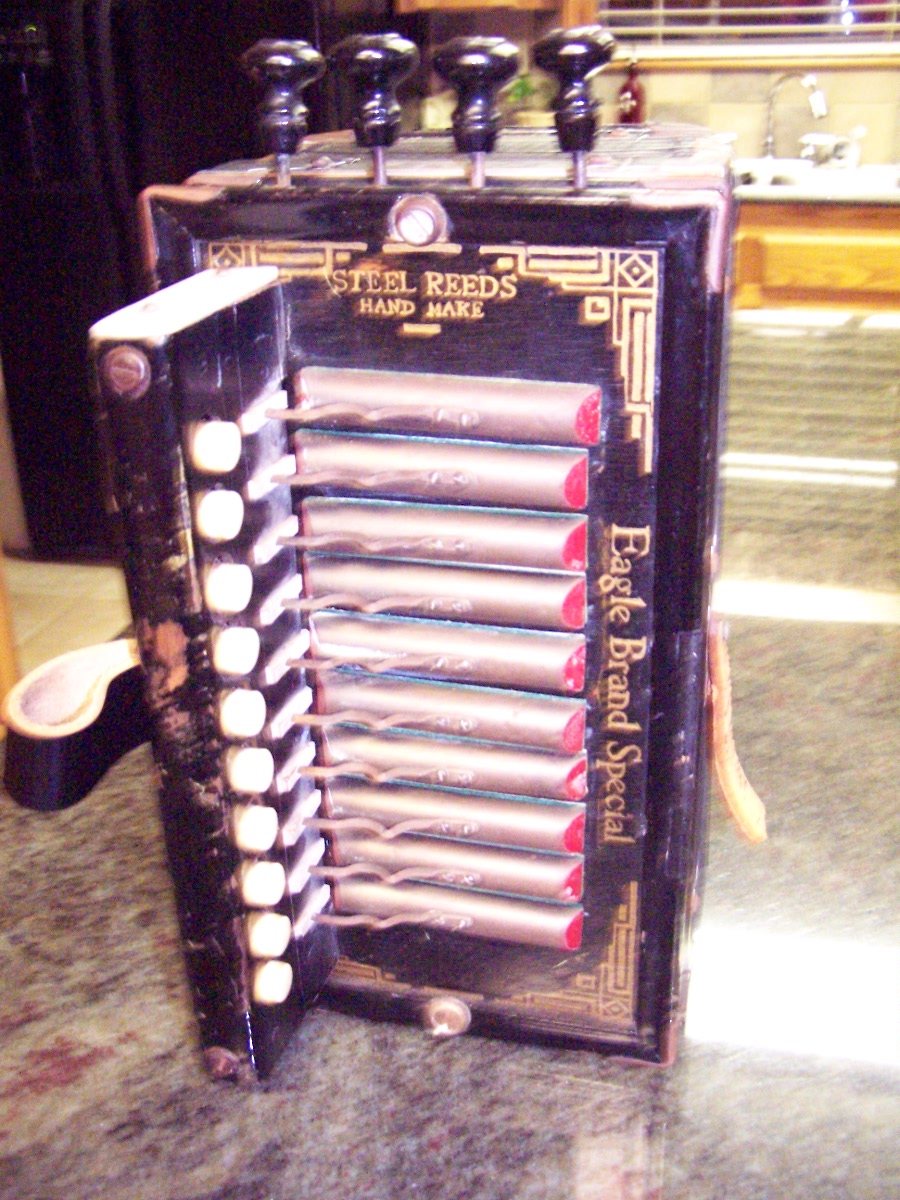
Joe Falcon's last accordion, a pre-WWII German "Eagle" brand

Some of the first accordions imported in America were "Lester", "Pine Tree" and "Bruno" brands, but they were bulky, cheaply made and hard to play. It was not until the beginning of the 20th century that Buegeleisen & Jacobson of New York City brought in from Rudolph Kalbes of Berlin, Germany, the "Monarch", then the "Sterling", in the key of C and D. These were assembled in Klingenthal, Saxony, Germany, by several different families. They were "les 'tit noirs", meaning "the little black ones". They were a bit smaller than some of the older brands and were all black with pewter trim. They were the best ever at that time. The Sterling family bought the factory in about the 1920s, and then the Eagle family operated the factory, but both instruments were virtually the same as the Monarch, except for the name. During World War II, the Nazi government focused on building its war machine and closed down the accordion factories. Eventually, the factories were bombed by the allies, effectively ending the production of these accordions. Today, they are collectables.

== Early recording era (1920s through 1940s) ==
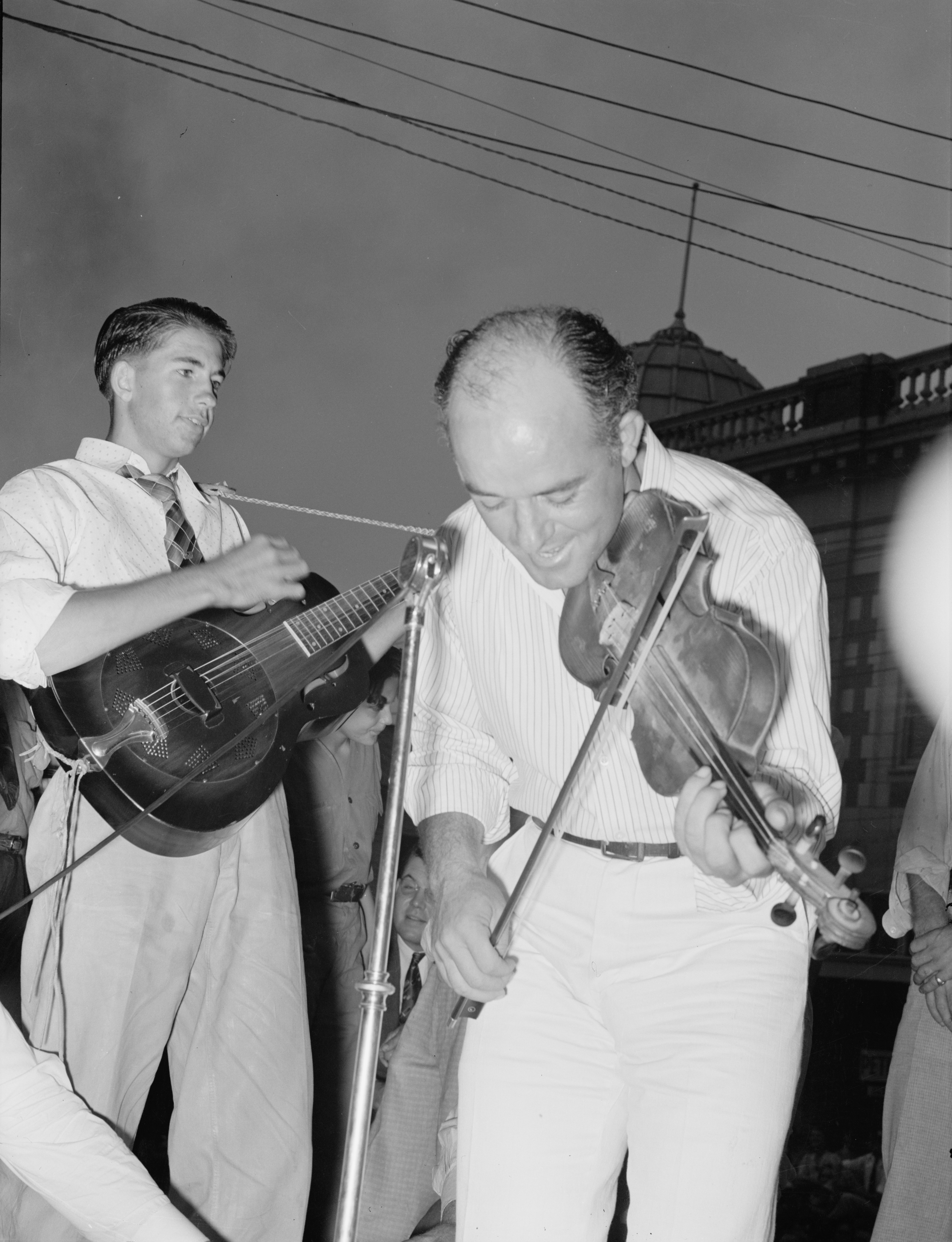
Musicians in Crowley 1938

The first recorded Cajun song, "Allons à Lafayette" ("Let's Go To Lafayette") was recorded in 1928 by Joe Falcon and Cléoma Breaux. Standard versions of songs started to emerge due to the increase in the availability of phonographs. Some of the earliest recordings of Cajun music that exist were done in Louisiana during the late 1920s by noted historian and American folklorist Alan Lomax.

Notable musicians during the time period include Falcon, Breaux, Amédé Ardoin, Breaux Brothers, Segura Brothers, Leo Soileau accompanied by accordionist Mayuse (Maius) Lafleur or Moise Robin, and Dennis McGee accompanied by fiddler Sady Courville or Ernest Frugé.

By the mid-to-late 1930s, a large influx of English speaking people came for the oil fields in Southwest Louisiana. Also, a large migration of French speaking Cajuns expanded to Texas. It was common for performers to sing in both French and English and borrow heavily from the popular country music and Texas swing music on the radio.

Harry Choates recorded the first national Cajun hit song,"'Jolie Blonde", in 1946. Other groups from the 1930s and 1940s that were able to garner national attention include Leo Soileau and His Four Aces, the Hackberry Ramblers, Happy Fats and the Rhythm Boys, the Alley Boys of Abbeville, the Dixie Ramblers, and J. B. Fuselier and His Merrymakers. Choates' "Jolie Blonde", and Hank Williams' "Jambalaya (On the Bayou)", which both used the melody of the Cajun song "Grand Texas", spawned regional and national interest in the music, opening the door to Nashville country music careers for Cajun musicians including Jimmy C. Newman, Rufus Thibodeaux, Doug Kershaw, and Jo-El Sonnier.

== The return of the accordion (1940s through 1970s) ==
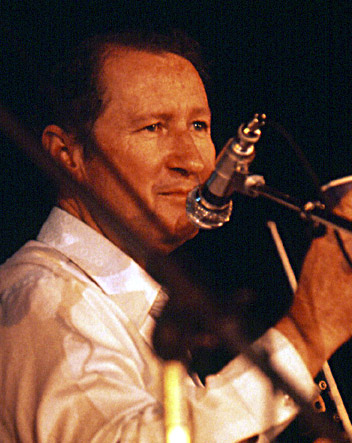
Dewey Balfa playing in Bordeaux, France, in 1977

This era is named for the cultural "Cajun Renaissance" movement of the late 1960s to the present, a period in Louisiana of burgeoning pride in the local Cajun and Creole culture and interest in preserving the French language and uniquely Louisiana traditions.

Important musicians in the years after World War II brought back the accordion as the lead instrument, following the string band era of the late 1930s and 1940s when the accordion was not featured on recordings. During the 1970s and beyond the trend continued, sometimes with elements of country-western music of the day and rock added to the sound.

A performance by Dewey Balfa, Gladius Thibodeaux and Vinus LeJeune at the 1964 Newport Folk Festival was one major reason behind a revived interest in traditional Cajun music in the mid-1960s. In 1972, the Council for the Development of French in Louisiana started an annual festival that came to be known as Festivals Acadiens.

When bands like the Balfa Brothers, Octa Clark and Hector Duhon, and the black Creole band Bois-Sec Ardoin and Canray began to appear and perform at prestigious national folk festivals like the Newport Folk Festival, the University of Chicago Folk Festival, and the National Folklife Festival, they inspired renewed interest in Louisiana in Cajun and Creole music, leading to the contemporary Cajun music scene.

Musicians of note from the classic period of the 1940s through the 1960s include Iry LeJeune, Nathan Abshire, Lawrence Walker, Aldus Roger, Austin Pitre, Joe Bonsall, Adam Hebert, Robert Bertrand, Phil Menard, The Sundown Playboys, Badeaux and the Louisiana Aces, Rodney LeJeune, Belton Richard, and many others. Musicians such as Walter Mouton, Paul Daigle, Sheryl Cormier, Johnny Sonnier, Ed Gary, and Jackie Callier continue the tradition.

This style of Cajun music is well documented by regional records producers such as Floyd Soileau (Swallow), J.D. Miller (Feature, Fais Do-Do), Eddie Shuler (Goldband), Lee Lavergne (Lanor), Carol Rachou (La Louisianne), and George Khoury (Khoury, Lyric). Jukeboxes, radio programs and TV spots in Cajun French helped publicize a band's work, making it easier to get jobs performing on the dancehall circuit in southwest Louisiana and East Texas.

== Contemporary era ==
By the 1980s, a new sound of cajun music mixed with elements of rock, blues and R&B was introduced to south Louisiana with Wayne Toups and Zydecajun.

A new respect for Cajun culture developed in the 1990s. Among the most well-known Cajun bands outside of Louisiana is the multi-Grammy-winning BeauSoleil, who have joined several country music artists in the studio, and served as an inspiration to the Mary Chapin Carpenter hit, "Down at the Twist and Shout".

== Today ==
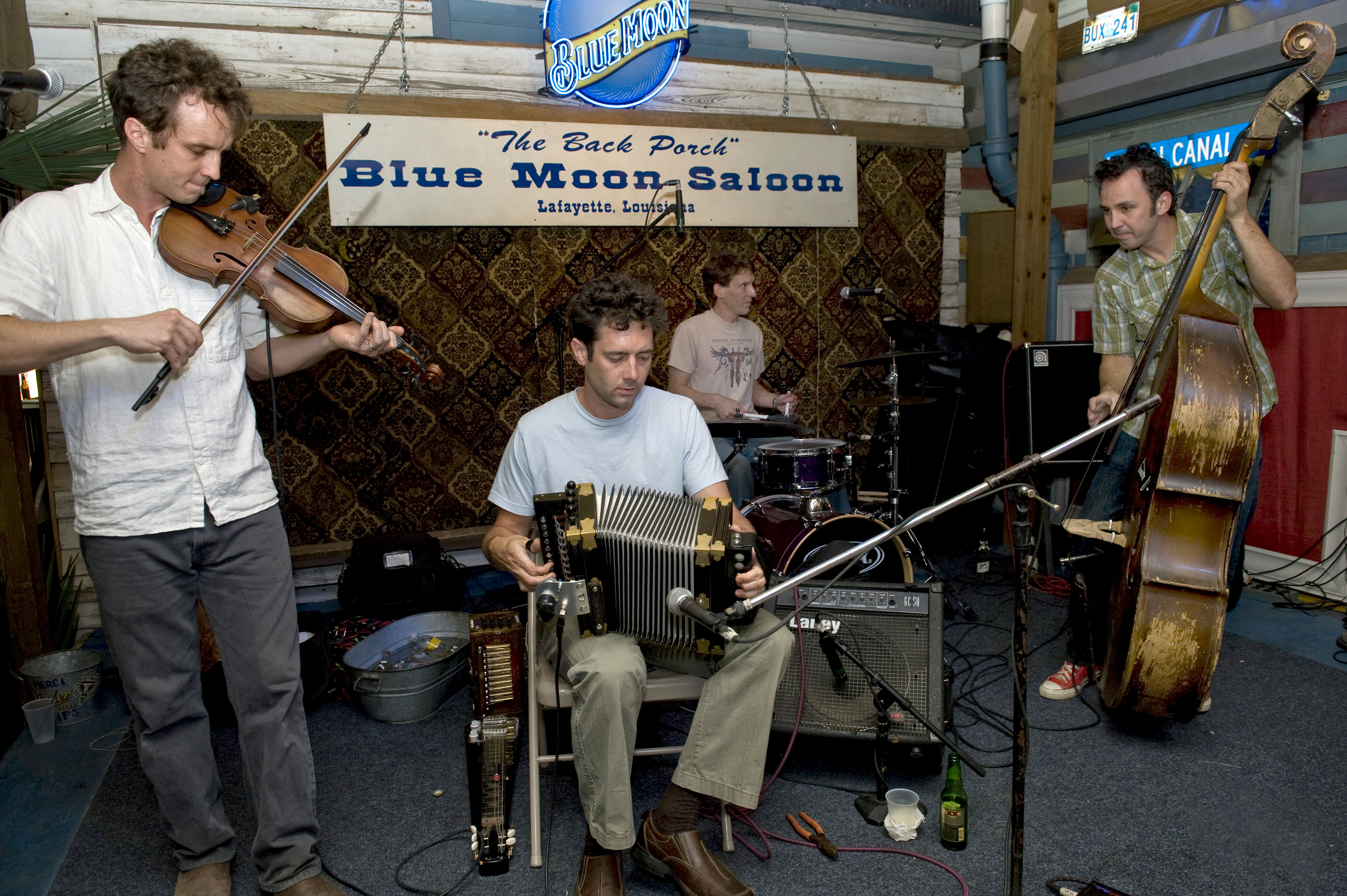
"Modern traditionalist" Cajun band the Lost Bayou Ramblers performing in Lafayette in 2009

Today, all forms of Cajun music can be heard, including those considered "modern traditionalists" who draw on a variety of elements from the broad history of Cajun and Creole music. From the 1990s to the present, artists such as Lee Benoit, Cory McCauley, Jason Frey, Mitch Reed and Randy Vidrine, Christine Balfa of Balfa Toujours, Ray Abshire, the Lost Bayou Ramblers, the Pine Leaf Boys, and Chris Miller have been popular with contemporary audiences while maintaining a connection with traditional forms.

On June 7, 2007, the Recording Academy (NARAS) announced a new Grammy category, Best Zydeco or Cajun Music Album, in its folk music field.

== See also ==
- Cajun music
- Cajun French Music Association
- List of festivals in Louisiana
- List of people related to Cajun music
- Cajun accordion
- Cajun fiddle
