= Cajun French Music Association =

Association dedicated to Cajun music and culture

The Cajun French Music Association is an association dedicated to the promotion and preservation of Cajun music and culture.

== History ==
The Cajun French Music Association is a non-profit organization of Cajuns and non-Cajuns whose purpose is to promote and preserve, not only Cajun music, but also various aspects of the Acadian Heritage. The CFMA was founded in Basile, Louisiana, in November 1984 with Harry LaFleur of Eunice, Louisiana, as its founder. Since its beginning with less than 30 members, the association has grown to a membership of approximately 2,000 families, serving seven chapters in Louisiana, three chapters in the Cajun region of Southeast Texas, and a chapter in Chicago, Illinois.

== Hall of Fame ==
The CFMA publishes a Hall of Fame.

=== 2019 ===
- Allen Fontenot
- Daniel Cormier
- Kerry Boutte

=== 2018 ===
- Tim Broussard
- Julius "Pappa Cairo" Lamperez

=== 2017 ===
- Johnny Sonnier
- Ervine "Dick" Richard
- Lawrence & Judith Patin / LaPoussiere Cajun Dance Hall

=== 2016 ===
- Atlas Fruge
- Dieu Donne "Don" Montoucet

=== 2015 ===
- Ambrose Thibodeaux
- Leroy Broussard
- Milton Vanicor
- Hadley Castille
- Lee Manuel
- Elias Badeaux
- Will Balfa
- Jesse Stutes
- Cleveland Crochet
- Angelais LeJeune
- Nolan Cormier
- Rodney Balfa
- Willis Touchet
- Bois Sec Ardoin
- Geno Thibodeaux
- Doug Kershaw
- Barry Ancelet

=== 2014 ===
- Lee Benoit
- Felton Le Jeune
- Wallace "Red" Touchet
- August Broussard

=== 2013 ===
- Roland Doucet
- Orsey "RC" Vanicor
- Jesse Legé

=== 2012 ===
- Jackie Caillier
- Ellis Vanicor

=== 2011 ===
- Rodney Miller
- Wayne Toups
- Larry Miller

=== 2010 ===
- Sheryl Cormier
- Clarence Martin Jr.

=== 2009 ===
- Doris Matte
- Leo Soileau
- Jim Olivier

=== 2008 ===
- Lionel LeLeux
- Jo-El Sonnier

=== 2007 ===
- Elias "Bobby" Leger
- Terry Huval
- Dave Soileau

=== 2006 ===
- Reggie Matte
- Clifton J "Cliff' Newman

=== 2005 ===
- Pierre Varman Daigle
- Voris "Shorty" LeBlanc
- Darrell Higginbotham

=== 2004 ===
- Jimmy C. Newman
- Ed Gary

=== 2003 ===
- Robert Bertrand
- Larry L. Miller
- Te Bruce Broussard - D.J.

=== 2002 ===
- Rufus Thibodeaux
- Cleoma Breaux

=== 2001 ===
- Dallas Roy
- Anthony "Tony" Thibodeaux
- Pete Bergeron - D.J.

=== 2000 ===
- Phillip Alleman
- Harry Lafleur

=== 1999 ===
- Nonc Allie Young
- Andrew Cormier
- Houston LeJeune - D.J.

=== 1998 ===
- Phil Menard
- Ivy James Dugas

=== 1997 ===
- Fernest Abshire
- Nathan Abshire
- Amedee Ardoin
- Dewey Balfa
- Alpha Bergeron
- Shirley Ray Bergeron
- Joe Bonsall
- Amedee Breaux
- Sidney Brown
- Vin Bruce
- Harry Choates
- Octa Clark
- Elton (Bee) Cormier
- Lesa Cormier
- Lionel Cormier
- Camey Doucet
- Jerry Dugas
- Joe Falcon
- Ledel (Blackie) Forestier
- Oran "Doc" Guidry
- Adam Hebert
- Leroy (Happy Fats) Leblanc
- Iry LeJeune
- Rodney Lejeune
- Dennis McGee
- D.L. Menard
- Walter Mouton
- Austin Pitre
- Belton Richard
- Aldus Roger
- Floyd Soileau
- Lawrence Walker

== LeCajun Award Winners ==
The CFMA makes LeCajun awards each year for Band of the Year, Best Accordionist, Best Fiddler, Best Male and Female Vocalist, Song of the Year and Best Recording of the Year. Cajun bands worldwide may receive awards. A Winners' Corner lists those who won the most awards by category.

=== Appreciation Award ===
- 2015 Mitch Reed

=== Fiddler of the Year 1994–2009 ===
- 2009 Travis Benoit
- 2008 Joel Savoy
- 2007 Al Berard
- 2006 Courtney Granger
- 2005 Jason Begeron
- 2004 Louis Dronet
- 2003 Tony Thibodeaux
- 2002 Rufus Thibodeaux
- 2001 Travis Matte
- 2000 Michael Doucet
- 1999 Elridge Aguillard
- 1998 Travis Matte
- 1997 Travis Matte
- 1996 David Greely
- 1995 Terry Huval
- 1994 Travis Matte

=== Best Recording with a Fiddle 1989–1993 ===
- 1993 Terry Huval
- 1992 Al Berard
- 1991 Steve Riley / David Greely
- 1990 Rufus Thibodeaux
- 1989 Harry LaFleur

=== Accordionist of the Year 1994–2007 ===
- 2009 Paul Daigle
- 2006 Lee Benoit
- 2005 Jackie Callier
- 2004 Kevin Naquin
- 2003 Jackie Caillier
- 2002 Kevin Naquin
- 2001 Lee Benoit
- 2000 Kevin Naquin
- 1999 Jackie Caillier
- 1998 Jesse Lege
- 1997 Horace Trahan
- 1996 Steve Riley
- 1995 Reggie Matte
- 1994 Blake Mouton

=== Best Recording with an Accordion 1989–1993 ===
- 1993 Steve Riley
- 1992 Tim Broussard, Wayne Toups
- 1991 Steve Riley
- 1990 Bruce Daigrepont
- 1989 Bruce Daigrepont

=== Female Vocalist of the Year ===
- 2014 None given
- 2013 Megan Brown
- 2012 Jeanette Vanicor Aguillard
- 2011 Ashley Hayes
- 2010 Kristi Guillory
- 2009 Helen (Hélène) Boudreaux
- 2008 Kira Viator
- 2006 Valerie Benoit
- 2005 Les Amies Louisianaises: Jeanette Aguillard, Janet Aguillard, Donna Suarez, Lisa Aguillard
- 2004 Ashley Hayes
- 2003 None selected
- 2002 Eva Touchet
- 2001 Christine Balfa
- 2000 Suzanne Fallon-Diaz
- 1999 Les Amies Louisianaises: Jeanette Aguillard, Janet Aguillard, Shelia Agillard, Donna Thibodeaux
- 1998 None given
- 1997 Christine Balfa
- 1996 Helen Boudreaux
- 1995 Kristi Guillory
- 1994 Helen Boudreaux
- 1993 Ann Savoy
- 1992 Becky Richard
- 1991 Becky Richard
- 1990 Becky Richard
- 1989 Becky Richard

=== Male Vocalist of the Year ===
- 2006 Lee Benoit
- 2005 Ivy Dugas
- 2004 Belton Richard
- 2003 Ivy Dugas
- 2002 Ed Gary
- 2001 Don Fontenot
- 2000 Kevin Naquin
- 1999 Ivy Dugas
- 1998 Ivy Dugas
- 1997 Ivy Dugas
- 1996 Robert Jardell
- 1995 Jo-El Sonnier
- 1994 Robert Elkins
- 1993 Robert Elkins
- 1991 Johnny Sonnier
- 1992 Johnny Sonnier
- 1990 Johnny Allen
- 1989 Robert Elkins

=== Best First Recording of the Year 1998–2011 ===
- 2011 "Don't Bury Me" - Ellis Vanicour & the Lacassine Playboys w/ Kaleb Trahan
- 2010 "Cadien Vien Au Village" - Gerald Thibodeaux & Cajun Accent w/ Ken Stewart, Justin Cormier, Vincent Romero, Larry Comeaux, Jody Breaux
- 2009 "Hommage á Andrew Cormier" - Charles Thibodeaux & the Austin Cajun Aces w/ Dale Dougay, Steve Doerr, Tracey Schwartz
- 2008 Unknown
- 2007 Unknown
- 2006 Les Larmes Dans Tes Yeux - Seth Guidry
- 2005 Charlie Roger and the Lafayette Playboys
- 2004 "For Old Time Sake" - Ray Abshire and Friends
- 2003 "La Tete Fille De Carencro" - Al Roger, Terry Cormier & Louisiana Pride
- 2002 "Deux Vies Pour Te Donner" - Jay Cormier
- 2001 "A la Vielle Maniere"(The Old Way) w/Jason Frey, Travis Matte, With Lagniappe
- 2000 "Pour Les Danseur" w/Kenneth Thibodeaux, Jason Frey, Randy Bellard, Jimmy Higginbotham, Ray Thibodeaux, Danny Cormier, Scott Ardoin
- 1999 "Fier D'etre Cajun" w/Don Fontenot, Eldridge Aguillard, Leighton Thibodeaux, Karl Deshotels, Kurt Daigle, Waven Boone, Freddie Pate, Danny Cormier, Troy Jagneaux
- 1998 "Memories de Passe" Mack Manuel, Jesse Lege w/Lake Charles Ramblersw/Jesse Lege, Mack Manuel, Orsy "R.C." Vanicor, Elzie Matthews, Robert La Pointe, Leetal Hank

=== Best First Album/CD by a Band 1996–1997 ===
- 1997 "Ossun Express" Horace Trahan & Ossun Express w/Horace Trahan, D. L. Menard, Terry Huval, Stacey Huval, Christine Balfa, Nelda Balfa, Kevin Wimmer, Dirk Powell
- 1996 "Robert Jardell & Pure Cajun" w/Robert Jardell, Milton Melancon, Edwin Guidry, Edmond Guidry, Jody Viator
- 2009 " 3 Daigles & a Huval, Paul Daigle Jacob Daigle Braylin Daigle & Calen Huval

=== Best First Album by a Band 1992–1995 ===
2009 " 3 Daigles & a Huval, Paul Daigle Jacob Daigle Braylin Daigle & Calen Huval

- 1995 "Reveille" w/Kristi Guillory, Bill Grass
- 1994 "Beau Thomas & Cajun Power" w/Beau Thomas, Jimmie Barzar, Billy "Botch" Richard, Glen "Chic" Richard, Randy Melancon, Colby Thomas, Joe Simon, "Cajun Power" John Trahan, Robert Jardell, Christine Balfa
- 1993 "La Musique de Vieux Temps" Joe Simon & the La. Cajuns w/ Joe Simon, Percy Boudreaux, Ed Gary, Mervin Faul, Mark Corbello, Hugh Johnson
- 1992 "Memories de MaMa" "Danny Brasseaux & Cajun Express" w/Danny Brasseaux, Floyd Brasseaux, Ulysse Poirrier, Kenneth Richard, Ricky Venable, Scotty Hargroder

=== Award for the Preservation of Traditional Cajun Music 1992 ===
McCauley, Reed, Vidrine

=== New Horizon Award 1991 ===
- 1991 "Steve Riley & the Mamou Playboys" w/Steve Riley, David Greely, Kevin Barzas, Mike "Chop" Chapman, Christine Balfa

=== Up & Coming Band 1989–1990 ===
- 1990 "Sheryl Cormier & Cajun Sound"
- 1989 "Laissez Faire" w/Ed Billeaud, Wilson Touchet, D. Peters, E. Chapman, R. Monsour

=== Best Recording of the Year 1998–2007 ===
- 2006 Bayou Roots by Chris Miller and Bayou Roots
- 2005 A Bit of Two Worlds - Jackie Callier and the Cajun Cousins
- 2004 "Bayou Groove" - Kevin Naquin
- 2003 "Let's Kick Up Some Dust" - Jackie Caillier & The Cajun Cousins
- 2002 "AuCoup D'eclair" - Kevin Naquin
- 2001 "Le Necessaire" (The Necessities) w/Don Fontenot et Les Amis de la Louisiane
- 2000 "Pour La Premiere Fois" Kevin Naquin & the Ossun Playboys w/ Kevin Naquin, John Gary, Louis Dronet, Jody Viator, Dwayne Lavergne, Randy Foreman, Derick Maitre, Tony Daigle
- 1999 "Je Vas Sortir et Two Step" Jackie Caillier & the Cajun Cousins w/Jackie Caillier, Ivy Dugas, Keith Richard, Benny Mueller, Danny Cormier
- 1998 "Blacktop the Gravel Road" Jackie Caillier & the Cajun Cousins w/Jackie Caillier, Ivy Dugas, Benny Mueller, Danny Cormier, Keith Richard

=== Best Album/CD of the Year 1996–1997 ===
- 1997 "Front Porch Cajun Music" Jackie Caillier & the Cajun Cousins w/Jackie Caillier, Dallas Roy, Ivy James Dugas, John Dale Hebert, Benny Mueller, DannyCormier, Marty Pryor
- 1996 "Les Petites Heures de la Nuit" Richard LeBouef & Two Step w/Richard LeBouef, Kevin Sonnier, Randy Melancon, Tommy Guidry, Jimmy Hebert, Tim Picard, Darrel Fontenot, Beau Thomas, Camey Doucet

=== Best Album of the Year 1989–1995 ===
- 2009 " 3 Daigles & a Huval, Paul Daigle Jacob Daigle Braylin Daigle & Calen Huval
- 1995 "Laisse Les Jeunes Jouer" Jambalaya Cajun Band
- 1994 "Cajun Sentiment" Le Band Passe Partout w/Joe Lirette, Robert Elkins, Travis Matte, Percy Boudreaux, Jr., Larry Hoffpauir
- 1993 "Tit Gailop Pour Mamou" Steve Riley & the Mamou Playboys
- 1992 "Untit Peu Plus Cajun" Jimmy Breaux w/Michael Doucet, David Doucet, Gary Breaux, U. J. Meaux, Richard Comeaux
- 1991 (see New Horizon Award)
- 1990 "Co-eur de Cajun" Bruce Daigrepont & the Bouree Cajun Band
- 1989 "Stir Up The Roux" Bruce Daigrepont & the Bouree Cajun Band

=== Song of the Year ===
- 2006 "Ma Petite Femme" Lee Benoit singer/Al Berard songwriter
- 2005 Biggest Fool in the World - Ivy Dugas (Greatest Hits and More)
- 2004 "C'est Trop Tard" - Kevin Naquin
- 2003 "Joues Pas Avec Le Couer Oui T-Aime" - Ivy Dugas
- 2002 "Belle Louisiane" - Brittany Polaski - vocals / Zachary Richard - songwriter
- 2001 "The Porch Swing" Don Fonenot singer/Ellis Deshotels songwriter
- 2000 "Je Suis En Amour Avec La Femme Que J'ai Marier" Kevin Naquin singer & songwriter/John Gary singer/Jean Arceneaux songwriter
- 1999 "La Visit" Lee Benoit singer & songwriter/Eddie Bodin background vocals/Richard Meaux & Freddie Pate songwriters
- 1998 "Little Short Pants" Ivy Dugas singer/Vin Bruce & Lee Lavergne songwriters
- 1997 "The Gravel Road" Ivy Dugas singer & songwriter
- 1996 "Where Were You Last Wednesday?" Robert Jardell singer/Robert Jardell songwriter
- 1995 "La Valse de Chere BeBe" Jo-El Sonnier singer/Jo-El Sonnier songwriter
- 1994 "Ne Phes de Whisky Pour Pop" Robert Elkins singer/John Hebert songwriter
- 1993 "Je Suis Tout Pour Toi" Robert Elkins singer/John Hebert songwriter
- 1992 "Late in Life" Wayne Toups singer/Jean Arceneaux songwriter
- 1991 "Dernier, Dernier Chance" Johnny Sonnier singer/Ken Vallot songwriter
- 1990 "L Image dans le Mirror" Johnny Sonnier singer/Ken Vallot & Raymond Taussin songwriters
- 1989 "La Lumiere dans tor Chassis" Robert Elkins singer/Pierre Varmon Daigle songwriter

=== Band of the Year ===
- 2009 Paul Daigle & Family Gold - Paul Daigle, Jacob Daigle, Braylin Daigle, Calen Huval
- 2006 Chris Miller and Bayou Roots
- 2005 Jackie Caillier and the Cajun Cousins
- 2004 Kevin Naquin and the Ossun Playboys
- 2003 Jackie Caillier and the Cajun Cousins
- 2002 Kevin Naquin & the Ossun Playboys - Kevin Naquin, John Gary, Louis Dronet, Jody Viator, Dwayne Lavergne
- 2001 Don Fontenot et Les Amis de la Louisiane - Don Fontenot, Kurt Daigle, Karl Deshotels, Layton W. Thibodeaux Sr., Mark Young
- 2000 Kevin Naquin & the Ossun Playboys - Kevin Naquin, John Gary, Louis Dronet, Jody Viator, Dwayne Lavergne, Randy Foreman, Derick Maitre, Tony Daigle
- 1999 Jackie Caillier & the Cajun Cousins - Jackie Caillier, Ivy Dugas, Keith Richard, Benny Mueller, Danny Cormier
- 1998 Jackie Caillier & the Cajun Cousins - Jackie Caillier, Ivy James Dugas, Benny Mueller, Danny Cormier, Keith Richard
- 1996 Robert Jardell & Pure Cajun - Robert Jardell, Milton Melancon, Edwin Guidry, Edmond Guidry, Jody Viator
- 1997 Jackie Caillier & the Cajun Cousins - Jackie Caillier, Dallas Roy, Ivy James Dugas, John Dale Hebert, Benny Mueller, Danny Cormier, Marty Pryor
- 1995 Steve Riley & the Mamou Playboys - Steve Riley, David Greely, Peter Schwarz
- 1994 Steve Riley & the Mamou Playboys - Steve Riley, David Greely, Kevin Dugas, Peter Schwarz, Kevin Barzar, Christine Balfa, Sonny Landreth
- 1993 Steve Riley & the Mamou Playboys - Steve Riley, David Greely, Kevin Barzar, Mike Chapman, Christine Balfa
- 1992 Johnny Sonnier & Cajun Heritage - Johnny Sonnier, Leroy Dugas, Jr., Jessie Credeur, Chad Cormier, Russell Quebodeaux
- 1991 Steve Riley & the Mamou Playboys
- 1990 Paul Daigle & Cajun Gold - Paul Daigle, Robert Elkins, Tony Thibodeaux, Kelly Hebert, Vernon Bergeron
- 1989 Paul Daigle & Cajun Gold - Paul Daigle, Robert Elkins, Tony Thibodeaux, Kelly Hebert, Vernon Bergeron

=== People's Choice Award (First presented in 2005) ===
- 2009 - 3 Daigles and a Huval - Paul Daigle & Family Gold
- 2007 - Old Style Cajun Music-Al Berard/Jason Frey
- 2006 - Bayou Roots by Chris Miller and Bayou Roots
- 2005 - A Bit of Two Worlds - Jackie Callier and the Cajun Cousins

=== Best Single Recording 1992–1993 ===
- 1993 Robert Elkins "Je Suis Tout Pour Tois"
- 1992 Johnny Sonnier/Helen Boudreaux "Tears Become A Rose"
- 1991 Richard LeBeouf "Acadiana Two-Step"
- 1990 Sheryl Cormier
- 1989 Johnny Sonnier "Paul Daigle on the Juke Box"

=== Most Traditional Cajun Band ===
This award was initiated in 1989 by Chairman Pete Bergeron to encourage bands to play and record the traditional style of Cajun Music

- 1990 Jesse Lege & the Jeff Davis Ramblers
- 1989 Jesse Lege & the Jeff Davis Ramblers

This Award is discontinued

=== Prix Dehors de Nous ===
This award was given a plaque prior to 1996. In years 1996, 1997, 1998 & 1999 the winner band was awarded one "Le Cajun". Beginning in 2000, each band member of the winner band is awarded a "Le Cajun".

- 2014 Cajun Roosters, Germany/United Kingdom (winner) "hell yeah"
- 2012 Cajun Roosters, Germany/United Kingdom (1st runner up) "Okra and a pepper"
- 2010 Cajun Strangers, Madison Wis (winner) "Cajun Country Ramble"
- 2009 Cajun Roosters, Germany/United Kingdom (1st runner up) "Double Shot"
- 2009: Cajun Roosters3, Germany/United Kingdom (2nd runner up) "From the swamps and bayous of Louisiana"
- 2007: Cajun Roosters, Germany/United Kingdom (1st runner up) "Crank it up"
- 2006-2007 Cajun Strangers, Madison Wis (winner) "Valse a Deux Temps"
- 2004-2005 San Diego Cajun Playboys, San Diego, CA (winner)-"Small Town Two-Step"; Boiling Bayou,
  - Denmark (1st runner-up)-"Boiling Bayou";
  - Cleoma's Ghost (second runner-up)-"Mon Coeur Est Avec Toi"
- 2003 The New Riverside Ramblers, Minneapolis/St. Paul, MN (winner) "Saute la Barriere"
  - Bal De Mason Band, France (1st runner-up) "Ce Soir Au Bayou Ecrevisses"
  - The Hackney Ramblers, England, (2nd runner-up)"Saturday Night Special"
- 2001 Cajun du Nord of Denmark, Norway & Sweden (winner) "In Louisiana"
  - Trans Bayou Express of France (lst runner-up) "Voyage dans le pays Cajun"
  - Catfish of Australia (2nd runner-up) "Two-Step at a Time"
- 2000 The Bone Tones of Minneapolis/St. Paul, MN (winner) "Live Recordings"
  - Ziga Zag of England (lst runner-up) "Desperately Seeking Boudin"
  - How's Bayou of Seattle, WA (2nd runner-up) "Pardon My French"
- 1999 Cayenne Cajun Band, Seattle Wash. (winner) "Live at Greenwood"
  - Manuel Family Band, Nashville, TN (1st runner-up) "Leissey Les Bon Temps Rouler"
  - Acadian Ramblers Band, Holland (2nd runner-up) "Ghost Dance"
- 1998 Squeeze Bayou, Va.-Washington D.C. area (winner) "Stepping Fast"
  - Vermenton Plage, France, "Lache Pas La Patate" (1st runner-up)
  - The Colorado Cajun Dance Band, "Colorado Cajun Dance" (2nd runner-up)
- 1997 Tracy Schwarz & the Cajun Trio, W. Va.. (winner)
  - Cajun Company, (1st runner up)
  - Atlanta Swamp Opera, Atlanta, Ga. (2nd runner up)
- 1996 Bon Tons, Minneapolis, Mn. (winner)
  - Danny Poullard & The California Cajun Orchestra, California (1st runner up)
  - The Magnolias, Providence R.I. & eastern Mass. (2nd runner up)
- 1995 Danny Poullard & The California Cajun Orchestra, California (winner)
- 2003 Cajun Company (winner) "La robe de Rosalie"
