= Lee Benoit =

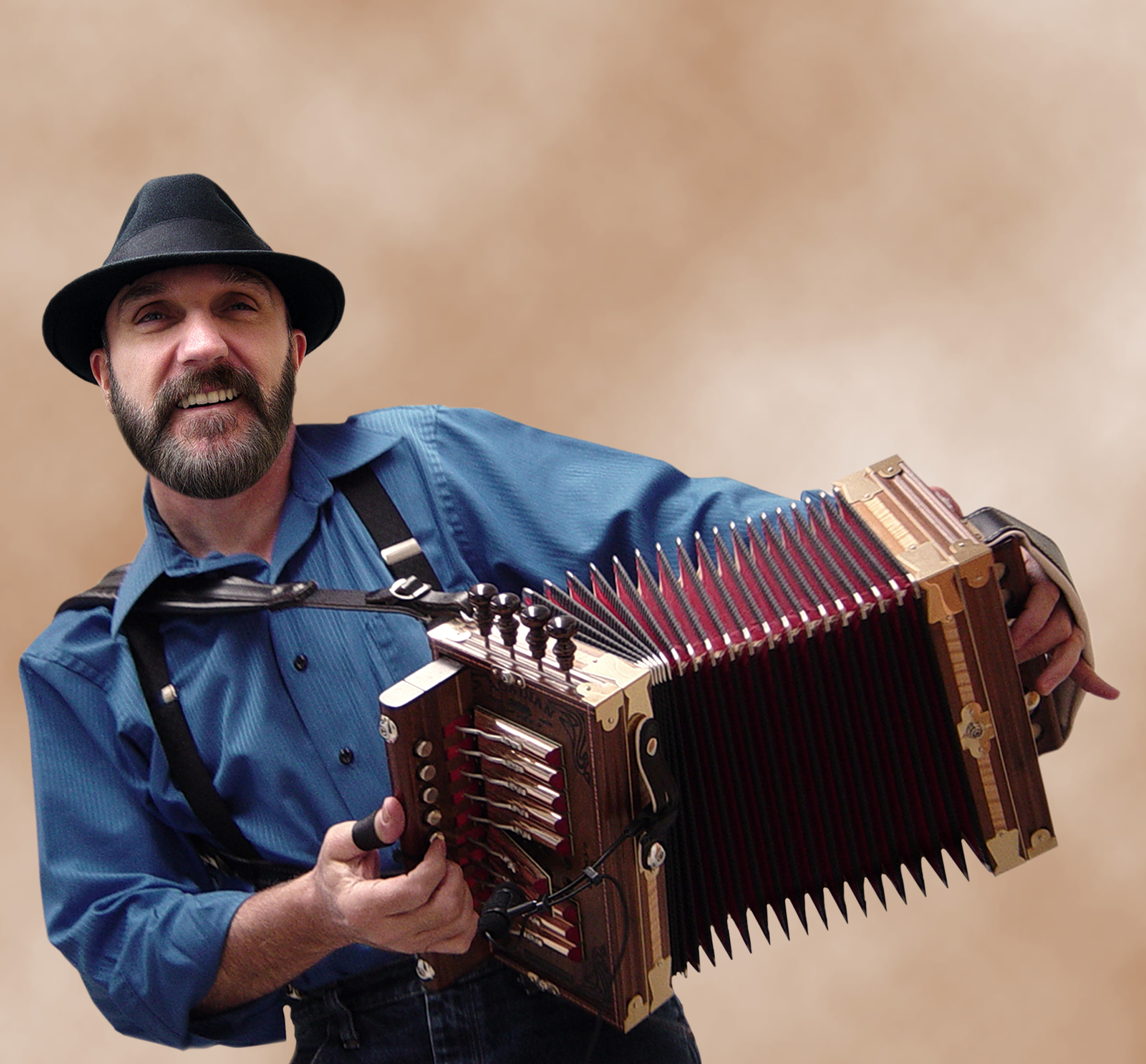
- Lee Benoit playing the accordion

Background information
- Born: 1959 (age 66–67)
- Origin: Rayne, Louisiana
- Genres: Cajun
- Occupation: Musician
- Instruments: Cajun accordion, Vocalist, Guitarist
- Website: www.leebenoit.com

Lee Benoit (born 1959) is an American Cajun musician from Rayne, Louisiana.

== Early life ==
At the age of five, Benoit was given an electric organ by his grandmother (Cidalise), who raised him. He started to play Christmas songs on it, by ear.

At the age of twelve, he started to play the electric guitar and formed a band. They played rock n' roll and were influenced by Lynyrd Skynyrd, Creedence Clearwater Revival, Hank Williams and others. Benoit also learnt to play the bass guitar during his teenage years.

In 1976, he joined the Marines as an Automated Data Processor. After leaving the Marines in 1979, he returned to education. In 1985, he became a nationally registered paramedic. He worked as a paramedic on an ambulance for seven years and then for another seven years on an oil platform. He continued to play rock and country music in his spare time.

== Inspiration and first recording ==
At the age of 29, he was inspired to take up the accordion by hearing the Cajun performer Wayne Toups. Benoit fell in love with the instrument and playing Cajun music. He soon added Cajun songs to his set lists.

In 1993, he signed to the Master-Trak label and in 1994 recorded his first CD (Avec Amis).: The album was nominated for "Best First Album" and "Valerie" was nominated for "Song of the Year" by the Cajun French Music Association.

== Touring History ==
Lee Benoit has built an international touring career spanning North America and Europe, performing at major festivals, cultural events, and concert venues for more than three decades. In 1990, Benoit toured approximately twelve cities across France from July 4 through August 6 with La Compagnie Louisianaises, a group founded by Dr. Robert Gilmore of Lafayette, Louisiana. He returned to France multiple times during the 1990s, performing in Dijon (1993), Tours (May 1994), Caen (September 1994), and again at the Solieu Festival in August 2011.

In August 1994, he performed in New Brunswick, Canada, at the first Congrès Mondial Acadien (Acadian World Congress) with the group Jambalaya. He continued his Canadian appearances by representing Louisiana at the Forum Francophone de Concertation in Quebec City in Montreal in March 1997, and later appeared at the Quebec Winter Carnival in February 2012 with Lafayette's Bayou Boys. Additional Canadian performances include the Seafood Festival in Moncton, New Brunswick (2003) and Festival Acadien de Clare in Nova Scotia (2009).

Throughout the late 1990s, Benoit maintained an active U.S. touring schedule. In 1998, he performed in San Diego, California alongside a young Hunter Hayes and completed a southeastern tour including Montgomery, Alabama; Knoxville and Nashville, Tennessee; and Asheville, North Carolina. He opened for The Doobie Brothers at the City Stages Festival in Birmingham, Alabama on June 20, 1998. Later that year, he completed an East Coast tour with stops in Nashville, Knoxville, New York City, Connecticut, Philadelphia, Maryland, and Richmond, Virginia.

His festival appearances during this period included the Philadelphia Folk Festival (1999), Glen Echo Cajun Dance in Maryland (1999), Wheatland Music Festival in Remus, Michigan (1999 and headlining in 2000), the Crawfish Festival in St. Petersburg, Florida (1999), Panama City Beach Festival and Skipper's Club in Tampa (1999), Buffalo Gap Cajun & Zydeco Festival in West Virginia (2000), and Taste Louisiana Cajun & Zydeco Festival in Iowa (2001). From 2003 through 2019, Benoit performed annually at the Decatur, Alabama Daikin America Festival each May. Other major festival appearances include the Oshkosh Cajun Music Festival in Wisconsin (2006) and the Long Beach Cajun Festival in California (2007).

With Lafayette's Bayou Boys, Benoit continued to appear at high-profile events, including opening for Three Dog Night at the Heymann Performing Arts Center in Lafayette, Louisiana on May 19, 2012, and performing at the Louisiana Governor's Mansion in Baton Rouge in June 2014. He also completed a West Coast tour in September 2017 with performances in Berkeley, San Francisco, Felton, and Sacramento, California.

In addition, throughout the 2000s, Benoit performed annually in Washington, D.C., with Lafayette's Bayou Boys for members of Congress and the U.S. Senate at the three-day Mardi Gras Ball celebrations.

== Performances, recordings and recognition ==
After the success of his first album, he continued to record his own albums as well as contributing to several CDs by other musicians. In 1995, he recorded on Hadley J. Castille's "La Musique De Les Castilles".[3] He also played on Hadley's "Forty Acres and Two Mules" album in 2000. He recorded with the group Les Amies Louisianaises on their La Musique Unique des Acadiens CD in 1997.[4] Benoit played accordion and guitar on Doug Kershaw's "Two Step Fever" CD in 1999.[5] He also co-produced and played guitar on Hunter Hayes "Through My Eyes" CD in 1999[6] and co-produced Hunter's second CD, "Make A Wish", in 2001.[7] In 2002, he played accordion on Don Haynie & Sheryl Samuel's songs God Bless Louisiana and Country Tavern on Saturday Night.[8] In 1998, he released his second album, "Live at Vermilionville" which was nominated in five categories by the Cajun French Music Association.:[9] "Male Vocalist Of The Year", "Accordionist Of The Year", "Album Of The Year", "Band Of The Year" and "Song Of The Year". He won the latter award, for "The Visit", co-written by Richard D. Meaux and Freddie Pate, at the ceremony on August 13, 1999. In September 2000, Benoit released his third CD, "Dis N Dat". In 2001, he was awarded "Accordionist Of The Year" and in 2002 earned the "Presidents Award" from the Cajun French Music Association.[10] Benoit recorded and mixed his fourth CD, "Ma Petite Femme" at his home and it was released in 2005. This album cemented his reputation, with Benoit winning "Male Vocalist Of The Year", "Accordionist Of The Year" and "Song Of The Year" (with the title song "Ma Petite Femme") from the Cajun French Music Association.:[11] Benoit also received nominations for "Best Recording Of The Year" and "Peoples Choice 2006". On August 19, 2011, Benoit was the recipient of the Heritage Award at the Le Cajun Awards Show by the Cajun French Music Association for outstanding contributions and dedication to the preservation of the Cajun culture. On August 16, 2013, Benoit was the recipient of the Award Of Excellence at the Le Cajun Awards Show by the Cajun French Music Association.:[12] for being a musician's musician. A musician that other musicians try to emulate. This award is for his overwhelming talent in his craft. On April 30, 2014, Benoit released his all original Cajun album titled "Pour Les Générations À Venir" (For The Generations To Come). This album was nominated in five categories with the Cajun French Music Association.:[13] for 2015. "Best Album Of The Year", the song "Le Garsoleil" was nominated for "Song Of The Year, "The People's Choice Award", and the group was nominated for "Band Of The Year". Benoit won the "Male Vocalist Of The Year" award at "The Le Cajun Award Show" on August 21, 2015. Benoit was inducted into The Cajun Music Hall Of Fame on August 15, 2014.:[14] On April 30, 2018, Benoit released his 6th CD titled "Louisiana Cajun Style".[15] It contains covers of Country songs about Louisiana that he recorded in a Cajun style. In 2019, Benoit retired from playing and recording music due to a severe back disability.

== Discography ==
- Avec Amis (1994)
- Live at Vermilionville (1998)
- Dis 'N' Dat (2000)
- Ma Petite Femme (2005)
- Pour Les Générations À Venir (2014)
- Louisiana Cajun Style (2016)

=== Awards and recognition ===
Live at Vermilionville received five Cajun French Music Association nominations: Male Vocalist Of The Year, Accordionist Of The Year, Album Of The Year, Band Of The Year, and Song Of The Year. He won Song Of The Year for “The Visit,” co-written by Richard D. Meaux and Freddie Pate, on August 13, 1999.

In 2001, he was named Accordionist Of The Year, and in 2002 he received the Presidents Award from the Cajun French Music Association.

For Ma Petite Femme, Benoit received CFMA awards for Male Vocalist Of The Year, Accordionist Of The Year, and Song Of The Year, along with additional nominations in 2006.

He received the CFMA Heritage Award on August 19, 2011, and the CFMA Award Of Excellence on August 16, 2013.

Benoit was inducted into the Cajun Music Hall Of Fame on August 15, 2014.

Pour Les Générations À Venir received multiple CFMA nominations in 2015, and Benoit was named Male Vocalist Of The Year on August 21, 2015.

In 2019, Benoit retired from performing and recording due to a severe back disability.

== Discography ==
- Avec Amis (1994)
- Live At Vermilionville (1998)
- Dis 'N' Dat (2000)
- Ma Petite Femme (2005)
- Pour Les Générations À Venir (2014)
- Louisiana Cajun Style (2016)

== See also ==
- Cajun French Music Association
- History of Cajun music
- List of people related to Cajun music

References 1. Avec Amis 2. Cajun French Music Association 3. Hadley J. Castille "La Musique De Les Castilles" 4. Les Amies Louisianaises "La Musique Unique des Acadiens" 5. Doug Kershaw "Two Step Fever" 6. Hunter Hayes "Through My Eyes Hunter Hayes 7. Hunter Hayes "Make A Wish" Hunter Hayes 8. Don Haynie & Sheryl Samuel "Here In America" 9. Live at Vermilionville 10. Cajun French Music Association 11. Cajun French Music Association 12. Cajun French Music Association 13. Cajun French Music Association 14. Cajun Music Hall Of Fame - Cajun French Music Association 15. Louisiana Cajun Style
