= Far Away from Home =

Far Away from Home may refer to:

- Far Away from Home, a 1977 film nominated for 14th Golden Horse Awards
- "Far Away from Home Blues", a song by Dewey Segura (1902–1987)
- "Far Away from Home", a song by Mel Tormé and Margaret Whiting on the 1961 album Broadway, Right Now!
- "Far Away from Home", a song by Groove Coverage from the 2002 album Covergirl
- "Far Away from Home", a song by will.i.am featuring Nicole Scherzinger from the 2013 album #willpower
- "Far Away from Home", a song by Cuco from the 2019 album Para Mi
- "Far Away from Home", a 2020 song by Sam Feldt with Vize featuring Leony
