= Larry Miller (accordionist) =

American accordion maker

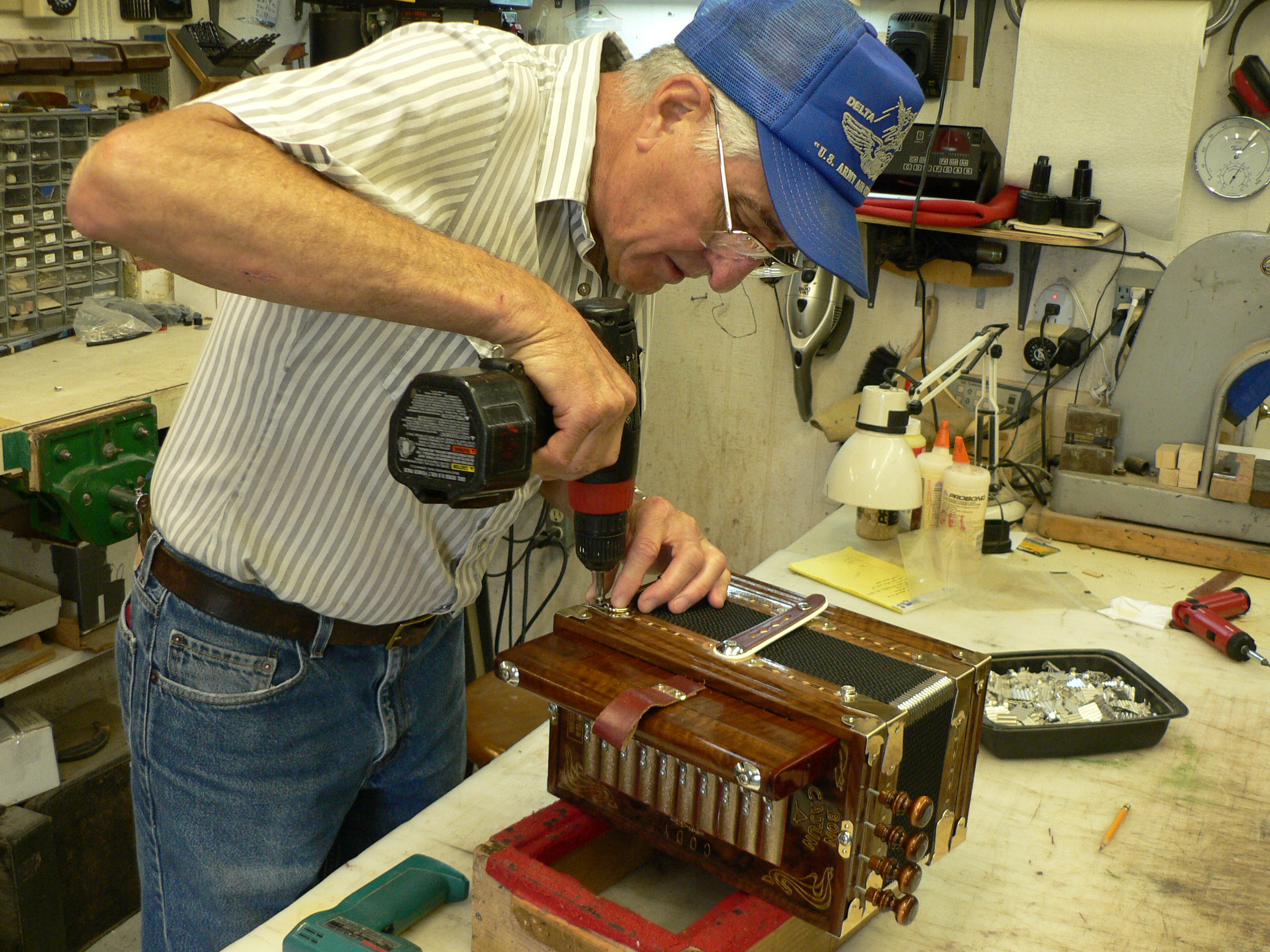
- Larry constructing an accordion.

Background information
- Born: July 7, 1936 (age 90)
- Origin: Iota, Louisiana
- Genres: Cajun
- Occupations: Accordion maker, musician, accordionist
- Instrument: Cajun accordion

Larry G. Miller (born July 7, 1936) is a Cajun accordion maker from Iota, Louisiana. The brand name of his accordions is "Bon Cajun" (originally "Bon Tee Cajun").

== Biography ==
Miller is the son of sharecropper Abraham Miller and Algena Leger. He worked in primary and secondary education for 22 years, and began to build accordions as a hobby in 1978. In 1988, building accordions became his full-time profession. He was also one of the founders of the Cajun French Music Association. Miller retired from building accordions full-time in 2006. His grandson Jay continues to build accordions under the brand "Bon Cajun."

In 2003, he estimated he built approximately 85 accordions and repaired 200 – 250 accordions each year. He says each accordion was hand-crafted and took between 160 and 175 hours to make, and he made about 1200 in total.

== Bibliography ==
- Miller, Larry G.; Miller, Mike (1984). You Can Play Cajun Accordion: Designed for Beginners. Swallow Publications. ISBN 9780961424596.
- Miller, Larry G. (October 2017). "The Craft of Building Cajun Accordions". The Journal of the Acoustical Society of America. 142 (4_Supplement): 2570. Bibcode:2017ASAJ..142.2570M. doi:10.1121/1.5014396.
