= CFMA =

CFMA may refer to:

- Cajun French Music Association, an association dedicated to the promotion and preservation of Cajun music and culture
- CFMA-FM, a Canadian radio station
- Commodity Futures Modernization Act of 2000, United States federal legislation that officially ensured modernized regulation of financial products
- Changan Ford Mazda Automobile Co., Ltd. was an automotive manufacturing company headquartered in Chongqing, China and a joint venture between Changan Automobile, Ford Motor Company and Mazda.
- Commitment to the Future of Medicare Act, Ontario legislation
