= Naquin =

Naquin is a surname. Notable people with the surname include:

- Kevin Naquin, American accordionist
- Oliver F. Naquin (1904–1989), United States Navy admiral
- Tyler Naquin (born 1991), American baseball player
