= Irene Whitfield Holmes =

American musicologist and ethnomusicologist

Irène Whitfield Holmes
- Born: Irène Thérèse Whitfield; 26 October 1900; Rayne, Louisiana
- Died: 10 May 1993 (aged 92); Lafayette, Louisiana
- Education: Southwestern Louisiana Industrial Institute, Louisiana State University, University of Chicago
- Occupation: Ethnomusicologist
- Notable work: Louisiana French folk songs (1939)
- Spouse: Lloyde Neil Holmes (m. 1940)

Irene Whitfield Holmes (née Irène Thérèse Whitfield; 26 October 1900 – 10 May 1993) was an American ethnomusicologist, educator, and a significant collector of Cajun, Creole, and Louisiana French folk songs.

== Life ==
Irène Thérèse Whitfield was born in Rayne, Louisiana, the second child of seven girls and three boys. She grew up on her family's rice-livestock farm, La Belle Savanne, between the small towns of Duson and Rayne in Acadia Parish. Her cousin was cultural geographer and educator Lauren Chester Post, whose father homesteaded the farm next to her father's.

Whitfield attended Southwestern Louisiana Industrial Institute (now the University of Louisiana at Lafayette), graduating in 1919. She obtained her master's degree from Louisiana State University, and her PhD from the University of Chicago in 1924.

Whitfield became a collector and compiler of Louisiana folk songs. As Patricia Petnik has written, in describing French language folk music, 'genre existed in the eye of the beholder'. In her preface to 1939's Louisiana French folk songs, Whitfield wrote that the songs were 'so varied that a rigid classification is practically impossible,' but 'for the sake of grouping' were 'roughly classed according to the type of French used in them'.

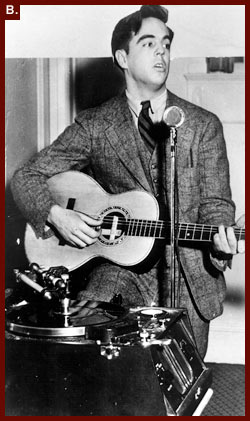
Alan Lomax, with whom Irene Therese Whitfield collaborated in collecting folk songs in southern Louisiana.

Daniel Kingman has described Whitfield's conception of the 'layering' of French language folk music in southern Louisiana, arising from various racial and cultural communities who have settled in the region. He writes that:

Whitfield has identified three distinct layers: that of the Louisiana-French, the settlers and their descendants who came either directly from France or indirectly with a stopover of a few generations in the Caribbean; that of the Acadians, or Cajuns, refugees from Acadia (now Nova Scotia), who were welcomed into Louisiana and given land by the Spanish rulers after their expulsion from Canada in the mid-eighteenth century; and... those of African descent.

For these approximate divisions, Whitfield followed Professor James Broussard of Louisiana State University, who described three 'forms' of French: Louisiana-French, Acadian, and 'Negro-French' or Creole. Whitfield's collection has been described as 'still the best available' and remains 'the most significant printed collection of Louisiana French songs.' In a subsequent 1969 edition of the work, Whitfield added additional songs and descriptions of her experiences gathering them.

Whitfield influenced Michael Doucet, who came across an article of her while researching in the archives at Louisiana State University. Doucet was introduced to Whitfield by his great-aunt, and Whitfield encouraged him to seek out the still living 'Cajun legends' in the area, as well as giving Doucet his first Amédé Ardoin records.

Whitfield also assisted the Lomaxes, John and Alan in gathering American folk songs for the collection at the Library of Congress.

Whitfield married Lloyde Neil Holmes in 1940, and was sometimes referred to as Mrs. Lloyde Neil Holmes. She was a celebrated educator, and member of a number of organisations.

Irene Whitfield Holmes died in Lafayette, Louisiana on 10 May 1993, aged 92.

== Bibliography ==
- Whitfield, Irène Thérèse (1939). Louisiana French Folk Songs (dissertation). Louisiana State University (LSU). Archived from the original on February 24, 2012. – In 1969, this title was re-published by Dover Publications, New York City.
- Whitfield, Irène Thérèse (1955). Acadian Folk Songs. Louisiana State University (LSU) Press.
- Whitfield, Irène Thérèse (1969). Louisiana French Folk Songs, with a New Appendix of Additional Songs. Dover Publishing. ISBN 978-0486220390.
- A musical analysis of forty-eight Cajun folk songs collected by Irene Therese Whitfield (Holmes) by James C Fields (1983)
