= Kevin Naquin =

American Cajun accordion player

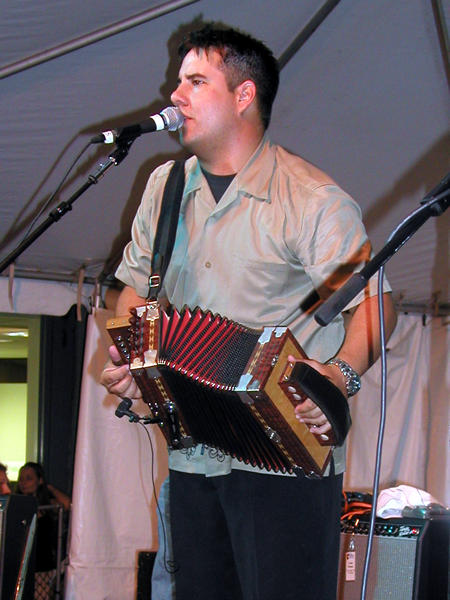
Kevin playing at the Lowell Festival in 2005

Kevin Naquin is a Cajun accordion player in south Louisiana and Republican member of the Lafayette Parish Council. Hailing from Ossun, Louisiana, Naquin is the lead singer and accordion player in the Cajun band Kevin Naquin and the Ossun Playboys. In 2000, he won the CFMA - 2000 Album of the Year with his album "Pour La Premiere Fois" and CFMA - 2000 Song of the Year. He has recorded with Swallow Records and Bayou Groove Productions.

== See also ==
- History of Cajun Music
- List of Notable People Related to Cajun Music
