= Dewey Segura =

American folk musician (1902–1987)

- Born: Jean Duet Segura; February 12, 1902; Delcambre, Louisiana
- Origin: Delcambre, Louisiana
- Died: November 15, 1987 (aged 86) Erath, Louisiana
- Genre: Cajun
- Occupation: Accordionist
- Instrument: Cajun accordion
- Labels: Okeh, Columbia
- Formerly of: Segura Bros.

Jean Duet "Dewey" Segura (February 12, 1902 – November 15, 1987) was an American folk musician. He and his brother Edier Segura (sometimes spelled "Eddie") formed the duo known as the "Segura Brothers" (also listed as "Segura Bros"). The duo created some of the earliest commercially recorded Cajun music in the late 1920s.

== Family ==
Born into a Spanish and French family, Dewey was one of twelve children. All of the children played music to some extent. While playing music, he would routinely bootleg moonshine around the region. He married Euphemie Desormeaux.

== Music and career ==
After the success of Joe Falcon and Cleoma Breaux's record "Allons a Lafayette", Columbia began recording Cajun music; beginning their new series of "Arcadian French" records (40500-F series for Columbia, 90000 series for Okeh). Dewey read in a newspaper on his way to Port Arthur, Texas, during a whiskey run, that recording companies were recording Cajun music in New Orleans. A relative that connections at Columbia helped get Dewey on the end-of-year schedule. On December 16, 1928, Dewey, with his accordion and his brother Eddie on vocals and fiddle, recorded two records for Columbia in New Orleans. The record "Bury Me in a Corner of the Yard" was Columbia's first in their series of "Acadian French" music. The B-side song "My Sweetheart Run Away" was mislabeled (due to confusion between Dewey and the recording engineers) and would later become the song "La Valse de Bayou Teche" recorded by many Cajun musicians.

Later, on December 9, 1929, his brother Eddie, along with Didier Hebert on guitar and Dewey on accordion and vocals, would record three more songs. Due to the heavy use of French among the English-speaking engineers, they asked him not to "sing anything dirty". The musicians would be labeled as "E. Segura & D. Herbert" on the records. Didier Hebert, a blind guitarist from Louisiana, accompanied them on the three songs and recorded a solo song, "I Woke Up One Morning in May", during the same session.

The duo would later record for Alan Lomax, compiled as "folk" field recordings and would be the only Cajun pioneers to do so from the early period. Two songs are recorded, an early version of Jolie Blonde called "La Fille De La Veuve" and "Viens donc t'assis sur la croix de ma tombe". Didier would record a vocal called "Mes Camarades Il Faut Parier" during the Lomax session.

== Legacy ==
Dewey Segura with his daughter Irene.

On June 22, 1934, the Library of Congress recorded both Dewey and Segura at the White Oak bar near New Iberia, Louisiana. Dewey would record again for historian Richard K. Spottswood in 1975 and would explain to Spottswood that the listings of "Joe Segura" were actually Edier or Dewey.

- "New Iberia Polka" Listen (MP3)
- "A Mosquito Ate Up My Sweetheart" Listen (MP3)
- "Your Small And Sweet" Listen (MP3)
- "Far Away From Home Blues" Listen (MP3)
- "Rosalia" Listen (MP3)

== Discography ==
1928 Session in New Orleans

- "Bury Me in a Corner of the Yard" / "My Sweetheart Run Away" (40500-F Columbia Records, 1928) (90000 Okeh Records, 1928)
- "A Mosquito Ate Up My Sweetheart" / "New Iberia Polka" (40507-F Columbia Records, 1928) (90007 Okeh Records, 1928)

1929 Session in New Orleans

- "Far Away From Home Blues" / "I Woke Up One Morning in May" (40517-F Columbia Records, 1929) (90017 Okeh Records, 1929)
- "Rosalia" / "Your Small And Sweet" (40512-F Columbia Records, 1929) (90012 Okeh Records, 1929)

Compilations

- "Louisiana Cajun Music Volume 1: First Recordings – The 1920s" (OT 108 Old Timey Records, 1970)
- "Louisiana Cajun Music Volume 1 & 2 The First Recordings 1928–34" (C-213 Arhoolie Records, 1984)
- "Louisiana Cajun And Creole Music, 1934 : The Lomax Recordings" (LP-8003-2 Swallow Records, 1987)
- "Cajun Dance Party: Fais Do-Do" (Legacy, 1994)
- "The Classic Louisiana Recordings • Cajun & Creole Music 1934/1937" (1842 Rounder Records, 1999)
- "Cajun: Rare & Authentic" (77115 JSP, 2008)

== See also ==
- List of people related to Cajun music
- History of Cajun Music
