= Rayne, Louisiana =

Rayne
- City
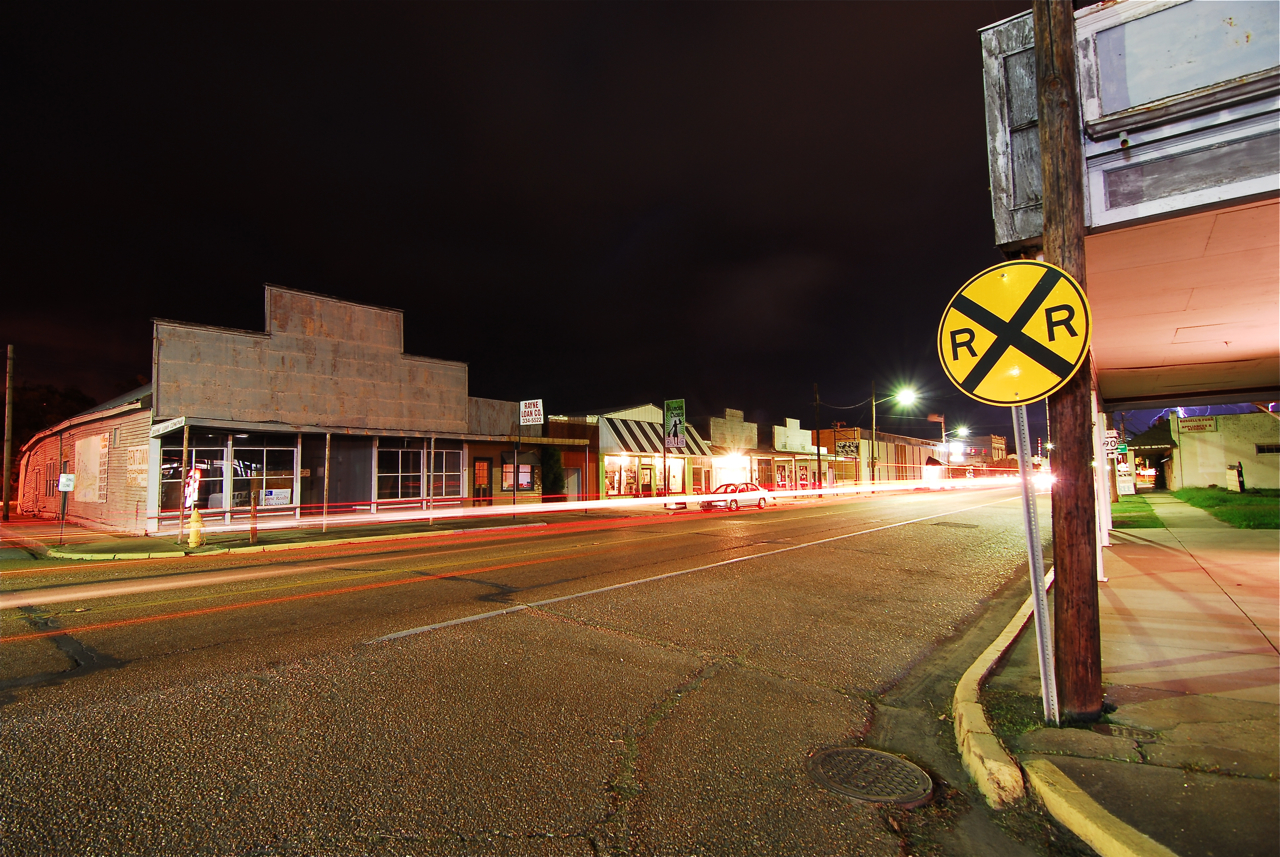
- Downtown Rayne
- Nicknames: Frog Capital of the World; Louisiana City of Murals
- Location of Rayne in Acadia Parish, Louisiana.

- Location of Louisiana in the United States
- Coordinates: 30°14′45″N 92°14′50″W
- Country: United States
- State: Louisiana
- Parish: Acadia

Government
  - Mayor: Chuck Robichaux (R)

Area
  - Total: 3.80 sq mi (9.84 km^{2})
  - Land: 3.79 sq mi (9.82 km^{2})
  - Water: 0.0077 sq mi (0.02 km^{2})
- Elevation: 30 ft (9.1 m)

Population (2020)
  - Total: 7,236
  - Density: 1,908.2/sq mi (736.75/km^{2})
- Time zone: UTC-6 (CST)
  - Summer (DST): UTC-5 (CDT)
- ZIP code: 70578
- Area code: 337
- FIPS code: 22-63645
- GNIS feature ID: 2404597
- Website: www.rayne.org

Rayne is a town in Acadia Parish, Louisiana, United States. It is in an agricultural area where rice and sugarcane have been grown. With a population of 7,326 at the 2020 United States census, it is nicknamed the "Frog Capital of the World", as well as the "Louisiana City of Murals". Rayne is part of the Crowley micropolitan statistical area, and within the Lafayette metropolitan statistical area in Acadiana.

== History ==
The area that would become Rayne was originally part of a large land grant awarded to French settlers in the 18th century. These settlers were primarily involved in agriculture, cultivating crops such as rice and sugarcane.

The establishment of Rayne began in the 1880s with the arrival of the railroad. The city was initially named Pouppeville, after a prominent local figure, but was soon renamed Rayne in honor of Rayne Grey, an engineer for the Southern Pacific Railroad, whose efforts were instrumental in bringing the railroad to the area.

Rayne's association with frogs began in the early 20th century. Local entrepreneur Jacques Weil noticed the abundance of frogs in the region and started exporting frog legs to New Orleans. Rayne would later become known for its frog exports.

An EF2 tornado hit Rayne on March 5, 2011, injuring at least twelve people and killing one person, leveling homes and causing natural gas leaks that prompted evacuations.

== Geography ==
According to the United States Census Bureau, the city has a total area of 3.8 square miles (9.9 km^{2}), of which 0.0077 square miles (0.02 km^{2}), or 0.18%, is water. The city is located in Acadiana, and forms part of the Lafayette metropolitan area.

== Demographics ==
Historical population
| Census | Pop. | Note | %± |
|---|---|---|---|
| 1890 | 569 | | — |
| 1900 | 1,007 | | 77.0% |
| 1910 | 2,247 | | 123.1% |
| 1920 | 2,720 | | 21.1% |
| 1930 | 3,710 | | 36.4% |
| 1940 | 4,974 | | 34.1% |
| 1950 | 6,485 | | 30.4% |
| 1960 | 8,634 | | 33.1% |
| 1970 | 9,510 | | 10.1% |
| 1980 | 9,066 | | −4.7% |
| 1990 | 8,502 | | −6.2% |
| 2000 | 8,552 | | 0.6% |
| 2010 | 7,953 | | −7.0% |
| 2020 | 7,236 | | −9.0% |
| 2025 (est.) | 6,995 | ▼ | −3.3% |
U.S. Decennial Census

Rayne racial composition as of 2020
| Race | Number | Percentage |
|---|---|---|
| White (non-Hispanic) | 4,428 | 61.19% |
| Black or African American (non-Hispanic) | 2,429 | 33.57% |
| Native American | 21 | 0.29% |
| Asian | 25 | 0.35% |
| Pacific Islander | 2 | 0.03% |
| Other/Mixed | 217 | 3.0% |
| Hispanic or Latino | 114 | 1.58% |

Frog mural

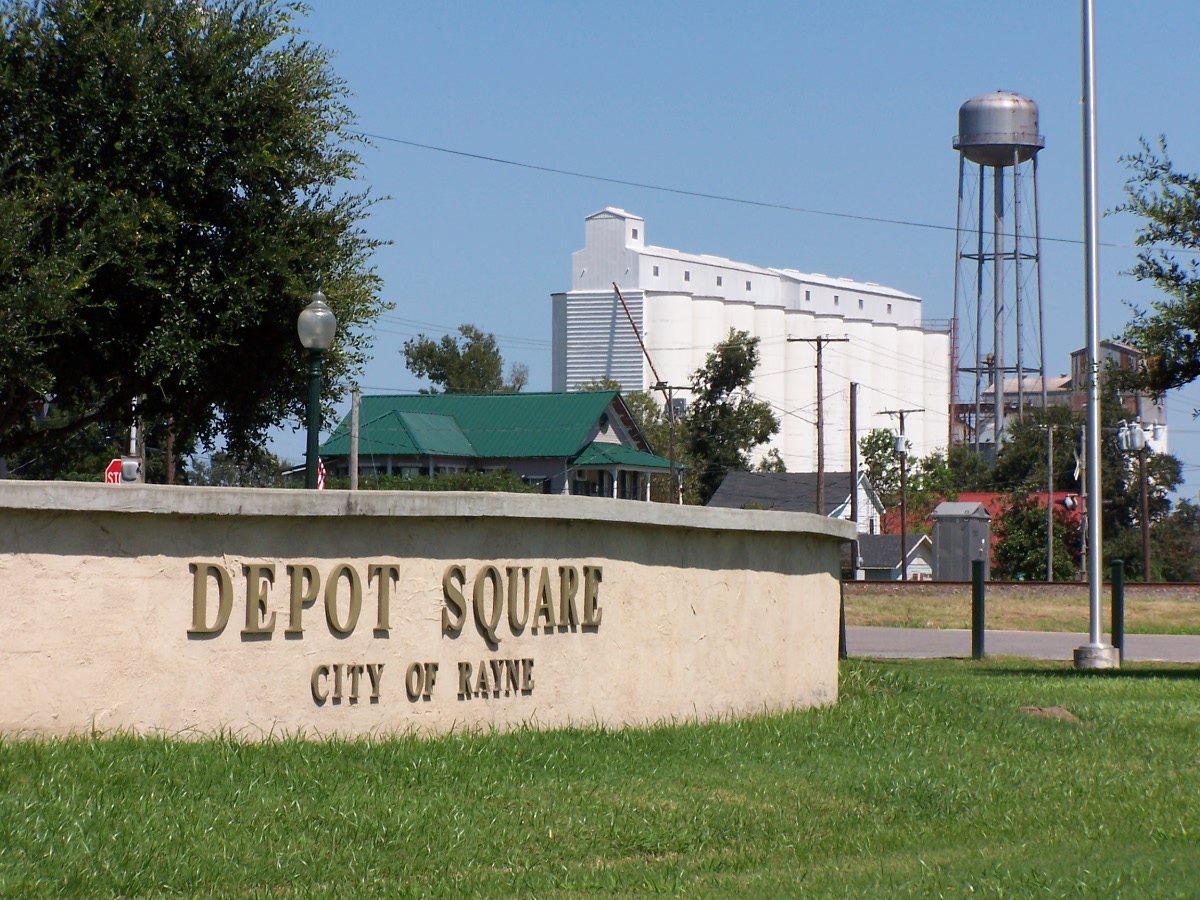
Depot Square with one of many Rayne rice mills in the background

As of the 2020 United States census, there were 7,236 people, 2,834 households, and 1,879 families residing in the city. The 2019 American Community Survey estimated 8,041 people and 2,834 households resided in the city.

In 2019, the racial and ethnic makeup of the city was 58.0% non-Hispanic or Latino white, 37.6% Black or African American, 3.3% two or more races, and 1.1% Hispanic and Latin American of any race. At the 2000 United States census, the racial and ethnic makeup of the city was 65.55% White American, 33.52% African American, 0.11% American Indian and Alaska Native, 0.16% Asian, 0.19% from other races, and 0.47% from two or more races; Hispanic and Latin Americans of any race were 0.81% of the population. From 2015 to 2019, the largest Hispanic and Latin American groups were Mexican Americans and stateside Puerto Ricans (0.3% each).

There were 2,834 households and 3,463 housing units at the 2019 American Community Survey. Of the 1,569 occupied housing units, 879 were married couples living together, 97 were male households with no female present, and 137 female households with no male present. The average family size was 3.34, up from 3.22 at the 2000 census, and 38.0% of the population were never married.

In the city, the population was spread out, with 10.9% aged 5 and under, 76.0% aged 18 and older, and 16.6% aged 65 and older. The median age was 40.2 years, up from 34 years in 2000. The largest ancestry groups among the population were French (18.8%), Irish (6.6%), sub-Saharan African (2.1%), German (1.9%), English (1.4%), Scottish (0.9%), and Italian (0.7%). An estimated 10.1% spoke a language other than English at home, and Spanish was spoken by 1.1% of the population; other Indo-European languages were spoken by 8.7% of the population.

At the 2019 American Community Survey, the median household income was $32,266 and the median income for a family was $41,721; married couples had a median income of $53,373 and non-family households were $17,917. About 30.4% of the population lived at or below the poverty line, and 38.2% of the city aged under 18 lived at or below the poverty line; 32.4% of the population aged 65 and older were at or below the poverty line.

== Arts and culture ==
Rayne holds a yearly Frog Festival the second full weekend in November as of 2008. The festival, which was previously held on the first full weekend of September following Labor Day, is attended by thousands of visitors. As of 2015, the festival is held Mother's Day weekend..

== Education ==
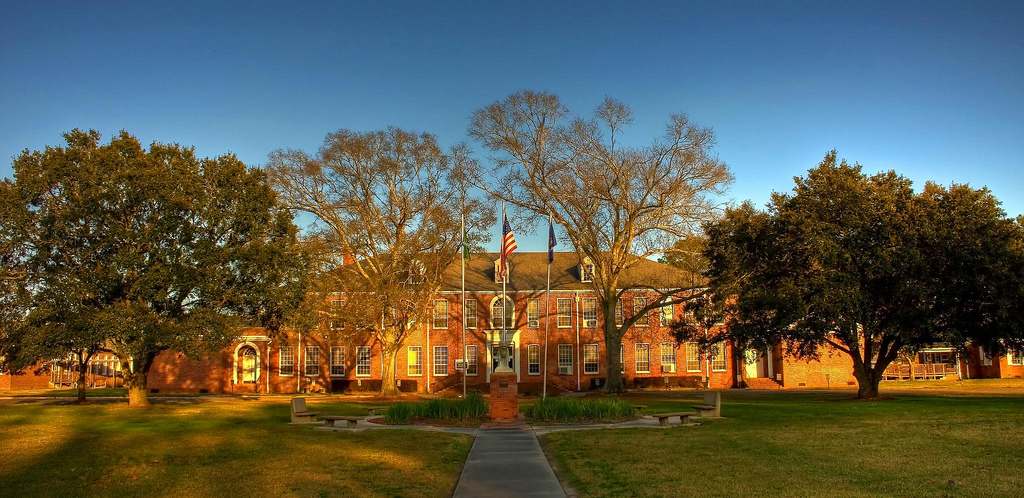
Rayne High School

The Acadia Parish School Board serves the city. Rayne High School, home of the Mighty Wolves, is located in Rayne.

Other schools in Rayne include:

- Central Rayne Kindergarten
- Martin Pettijean Elementary
- South Rayne Elementary
- Armstrong Middle School
- Rayne Catholic Elementary

== Notable people ==
- Cajun and swamp pop musicians Johnnie Allan, Lee Benoit, Amedée Breaux, Harry Choates, Joe Falcon, "Happy Fats" LeBlanc, Belton Richard, Jo-El Sonnier, Tony Thibodeaux, Lawrence Walker, and Joe Werner
- Joshua Benton, director of Nieman Journalism Lab at Harvard University
- Clint Conque and Ed Zaunbrecher, American football coaches
- Catherine Fischer, deafblind librarian and author
- Rhonda Franklin, professor of electrical and computer engineering at the University of Minnesota
- Mike Heinen, professional golfer
- Margaret Rose Henry, former majority leader of the Delaware Senate
- Donnie Meche, Gerard Melancon, and Elvis Perrodin, horse racing jockeys
- Byron Mouton, former standout basketball player at Tulane and Maryland
- Gerald Paddio, former NBA basketball player
- Dave Petitjean, humorist and actor
- Addison Rae (Easterling), American social media personality and dancer
- Josh Reed, LSU standout and NFL wide receiver for the Buffalo Bills
- Irene Whitfield Holmes, ethnomusicologist
