= Phil Menard =

- Born: September 6, 1923; Cankton, Louisiana, U.S.
- Died: October 26, 2016 (aged 93) Lake Charles, Louisiana, U.S.
- Instrument: Accordion

Phil Menard (September 6, 1923 – October 26, 2016) was an American musician who played the Cajun accordion. He lived in Lake Charles, Louisiana with his wife Georgie. Menard played with the band Louisiana Travelers featuring Ivy Dugas. The group are credited with popularising the Heritage Waltz.
