= Tony Thibodeaux =

- Also known as: Tony Thibodeaux
- Born: Anthony Thibodeaux; 2 June 1938
- Origin: Rayne, Louisiana
- Died: 30 September 2010 (aged 72)
- Genres: Cajun
- Occupations: Musician, Ffdler
- Instrument: Fiddle

Antoine "Tony" Thibodeaux (2 June 1938 – 30 September 2010) was a prominent Cajun fiddler born south of Rayne, Louisiana. His parents were Mary G. Thibodeaux and Nestor Thibodeaux.

== History ==
Mr. Thibodeaux was a lifelong resident of Lafayette, Louisiana. He is best known as a musician, but also had a career as an insurance salesman with Evangeline, Security and Melancon Life Insurance. Mr. Thibodeaux also served in the U.S. Army National Guard. Thibodeaux started to play the violin at a young age, borrowing his brother Leon's. In 1955, Thibodeaux joined the Lafayette Playboys and continued playing with them for over thirteen years, he also made multiple appearances on KLFY with the group. By the 1960s, Tony's musical abilities became well-known and became more in demand he would often book gigs with noted accordion players and play the fiddle alongside them. His music career spanned over the course of fifty years.

== Legacy ==
Thibodeaux held the "Fiddler of the Year" award from the Cajun French Music Association for the year 2003. He was also a member of the Cajun French Music Association Hall of Fame.
