= Dave Petitjean =

- Born: Joseph Dave Petitjean, Jr. January 11, 1928; Rayne, Louisiana
- Died: June 18, 2013 (aged 85); Lafayette, Louisiana
- Known for: Cajun entertainer and humorist

Joseph Dave Petitjean Jr. (January 11, 1928 – June 18, 2013) was an American actor and humorist of Cajun stories. Born in 1928 in Rayne, Louisiana, he attended college at Louisiana State University at the age of 16, before joining the United States Navy and serving aboard the USS Estes command ship during World War II. After the war, Petitjean studied agriculture at Southwest Louisiana Institute (now the University of Louisiana at Lafayette). He graduated and worked for a local chemical company, from which he retired 25 years later. He then worked for an insurance company until retiring in 2000.

It was during his years working for these companies that he began performing. His acting credits include appearances in 14 movies and television series, including the films Belizaire the Cajun, The Big Easy, Angel Heart and the television series In the Heat of the Night. He also recorded three compact discs and made nearly 50 motivational speaking engagements across the United States.

Late in life, he developed Alzheimer's disease and had to retire from performing. Petitjean died on June 18, 2013, at the age of 85. He is survived by his wife Audrey and sons Joseph and George.
