= Leroy Leblanc =

- Alex Broussard and Leroy "Happy Fats" Leblanc

Background information
- Also known as: Happy Fats
- Born: Leroy Leblanc; January 30, 1915; Rayne, Louisiana, United States
- Died: February 23, 1988
- Genres: Cajun
- Occupations: Accordionist, guitarist, vocalist
- Instruments: Cajun accordion, guitar, vocals
- Labels: RCA, Bluebird, Decca, Feature, De Luxe, Rebel

Leroy "Happy Fats" Leblanc (January 30, 1915 – February 23, 1988) was a Cajun swing musician that recorded with RCA Records in the 1930s and 1940s. He is known for his recordings with Harry Choates and his broadcasts on KVOL. Next to the Hackberry Ramblers, the Rayne-Bo Ramblers were the most popular and innovative of the Cajun string bands.

== Family ==
Leroy was born on January 30, 1915 Rayne, Louisiana to Gilbert Leblanc and Carrie Bird Hoffpauir. He married Della Meche. He traded rice in order to purchase his first guitar.

== Music and career ==
In 1932, his career started when he played guitar with Joe Falcon and Amedee Breaux. Later, in 1935, he would create the band known as the "Rayne-Bo Ramblers" which started as the backup band for Nathan Abshire and played regularly at the OST Club in Rayne. The band featured people such as "Rang Tang Bully" Joe Werner, Harry Choates, Oran "Doc" Guidry, Nathan Abshire and many more. By 1940, he and Harry recorded their first hit, "La Veuve de la Coulee". In 1941, the band split up and Happy joined Leo Soileau's "Rhythm Boys". Later, he would tour with Tex Ritter and appear on the world-famous Louisiana Hayride.

By 1953, every morning on KVOL, Happy would play popular Cajun bands on his radio talk show. That same year, he would meet with John Pusateri, formed the "Bayou Buckaroos", and recorded with Bella Records of San Jose. In his later years, Happy Fats signed up with J. D. "Jay" Miller's "Reb Rebel Records". In 1966, he recorded popular segregationist tunes, including one entitled "Dear Mr. President".

- Valse de Hadacol
- Crowley Two Step
- Dear Mr. President

== Legacy ==
On November 9, 1980, Governor Edwin Edwards declared the day "Happy Fats" Leblanc Day. He suffered from diabetes and died in 1988.

== Discography ==
Compilations

- "Cajun Country French Classics" (LL-130 La Louisianne, 1961)
- "Fais Do Do Breakdown - Volume One - The Late 1940s" (FLY 609 Flyright Records, 1986)
- "Cajun Hot Stuff" (Exceed, 1999)
- "Cajun Capers: Cajun Music 1928-1954" (PROPERBOX91 Proper, 2005)
- "Best of Cajun & Zydeco" (NOT2CD358 Not Now Music, 2010)
- "Leroy "Happy Fats" LeBlanc: His Rayne-Bo Ramblers 1938-1949" (Master Classics Records, 2011)
- "Leroy "Happy Fats" LeBlanc & His Rayne-Bo Ramblers" (BACM - British Archive Of Country Music)
- "Beasts Of The Southern Wild (Music From The Motion Picture)" (Thirty3 And A 3rd Records, 2012)

== See also ==
- List of people related to Cajun music
- History of Cajun Music
