= Octa Clark =

American musician (1904-1998)

Octa Clark (April 30, 1904 in Judice, Louisiana – September 11, 1998 in Lafayette, Louisiana) was an American Cajun accordion player. Clark was a local Lafayette area musician and made three recordings of Cajun music.

Clark is buried in Maurice, Louisiana.

== Discography ==
- Octa Clark Old Time Cajun Music (CD 9018 Arhoolie Records, 1981)
- Ensemble Encore (Rounder Select Records, January 1992)
- Cajun Spice: Dance Music from South Louisiana (CDROUN11550 Rounder Records, 1989)

== See also ==
- List of people related to Cajun music
