= Sheryl Cormier =

American Cajun accordion player

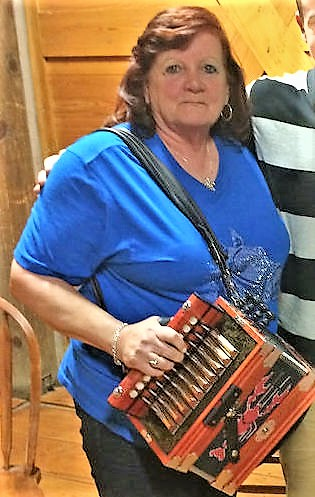
- Cormier in 2016

Background information
- Birth name: Sheryl Guidreau
- Born: March 15, 1945 (age 80); Grand Coteau, Louisiana
- Genres: Cajun music
- Occupation: Accordion player

Sheryl Cormier (born March 15, 1945) is an American Cajun accordion musician. She began playing the accordion when she was 7 years old. She is "one of the few women to establish herself in Cajun music" and is the first professional Cajun accordion female musician.

== Career ==
Cormier was a hair stylist before she became a professional musician. She started her own group in 1990 which included her husband Russell singing and her son Russell Jr. playing the drums. The group recorded the album "Queen of Cajun Music" ("La Reine de Musique Cadjine"). She also led an all-female Cajun band. In 1992, she released her second album titled Sheryl Cormier and Cajun Sounds. Throughout the 1990s, Cormier performed in Europe. The Arcadian Museum named her a Living Legend in 2002, and that year it was reported that Cormier released 45 recordings and performed in every major Cajun music festival. Her band, The Cajun Sound, includes her husband and son among others. Cormier had a heart attack in 2004 that kept her from performing for close to a year. In 2005, Cormier and her husband traveled to England for a performance at the Gloucester International Music Festival and throughout Europe.

Cormier is "one of the few women to establish herself in Cajun music" and she is the first professional female Cajun accordion musician. She has been named the Cajun Queen in the United States and Europe. In 1988, she was voted as Female Vocalist of the Year by The Times of Acadiana and she was given the title of Best Contemporary Artist. Her song "Mon Coeur et Mon Armour" won Best Song at the Cajun French Music Awards in 1989 and her band won Best Upcoming Band. Cormier was nominated for a Grammy Award in 1993. In 1997, she was placed in the Cajun Music Hall of Fame.

== Personal life ==
Cormier was born as Sheryl Guidreau on March 15, 1945, in Grand Coteau, Louisiana. She started playing music when she was 7 years old after taking her father's accordion. Cormier said, "I wanted to play his forbidden musical instrument. For a farmer, the accordion was a prized and costly possession, and the children weren't allowed to touch it. I quickly taught myself to play the Cajun music that I often heard my father and his band play." When she was a teenager, she played the accordion in a group that was led by her parents.
