= Lawrence Walker =

- Also known as: King of the Accordion Players
- Born: September 1, 1907; Duson, Louisiana
- Died: August 15, 1968 (aged 60) Rayne, Louisiana
- Genres: Cajun
- Occupations: Musician, accordionist
- Instrument: Cajun accordion
- Labels: Brunswick, Bluebird, Khoury's, La Lou, Swallow
- Formerly of: Wandering Aces, Walker Brothers

Lawrence Walker (September 1, 1907 – August 15, 1968) was a Cajun accordionist. He is known for his original songs, including Reno Waltz, Evangeline Waltz, Bosco Stomp, and Mamou Two Step.

== Biography ==
Lawrence Walker was born September 1, 1907, in Duson, Louisiana to Allen Walker, a fiddle player. At 13 Walker began playing in a band with his father and brother Elton, who was also a fiddler, while the family was living in Orange, Texas. Their band was called "The Walker Brothers Group," and they recorded their first record in 1929 with Brunswick Records. In 1936, Walker performed at the National Folk Festival. Although known for his accordion playing, he made most of his money through rice farming. He focused on music after World War II when he toured with his band The Wandering Aces. Walker died in Rayne, Louisiana, of heart failure.

== Accordion Playing ==
Walker was known for his ability as well as his showmanship on the accordion. Walker was able to please crowds as well as win many accordion contests.

== Legacy ==
Walker wrote only original songs, many of which are still in Cajun repertoire. Walker was inducted into the Cajun French Music Association Hall of Fame in 1997 – its inaugural year.

== Discography ==
Compilations

- Cajun Honky Tonk – Various Artists (CD 427 Arhoolie, 1995)
- A Tribute to the Late, Great Lawrence Walker (LL-126 La Louisianne, 1995, 2000)
- Essential Collection of Lawrence Walker (SW6221 Swallow, 2010)
- Cajun Honky Tonk: The Khoury Recordings, Vol. 2 (CD 541 Arhoolie, 2012)
