= Wayne Toups =

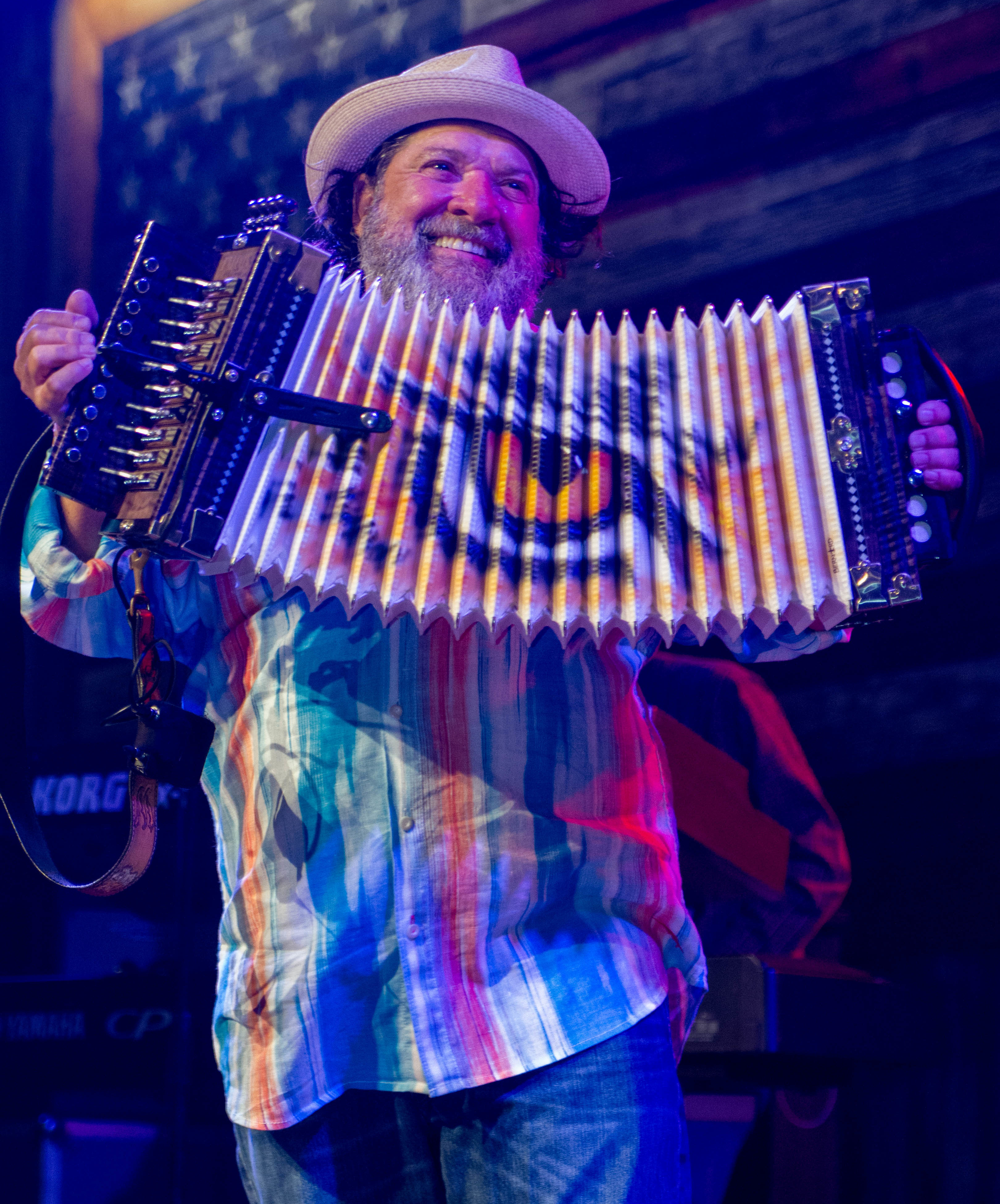
- Toups in 2017

Background information
- Born: October 2, 1958 (age 68)
- Origin: Crowley, Louisiana, United States
- Genres: Cajun, zydeco, folk, Americana
- Occupations: Musician, accordionist, singer
- Instrument: Accordion
- Years active: 1985–present
- Labels: Mercury Records Swallow, BTM, Shanachie, Sonet, Valcour Records
- Website: http://waynetoupsmusic.com

Wayne Toups (born October 2, 1958, in Crowley, Louisiana) is one of the most commercially successful American Cajun singers. He is also a songwriter. Wayne Toups has been granted numerous awards and honors throughout his career including 2010 Festivals Acadiens et Créoles dedicated in his name, Offbeat Magazine Album of the Year recipient. Member of The Louisiana Music Hall of Fame, Gulf Coast Hall of Fame, and Cajun French Music Hall of Fame, 55th Annual Grammy Award winner.

== Biography ==
Wayne Toups was born into a family of rice farmers in Crowley, Louisiana. He first picked up an accordion when he was 13 and quickly began winning local accordion contests. He has combined Cajun music, zydeco, R&B, and rock into a genre he calls Zydecajun. He sings in both English and French.

Toups released his first album, Wayne Toups and the Crowley Aces in Europe in the late 1970s. He began gaining popularity in the United States around 1984 when he began performing at local festivals such as the Festivals Acadiens in Lafayette, Louisiana. In 1986 he released his first album, Zydecajun. The Cajun French Music Association's awarded him their "Song of the Year" Award in 1991 for his song "Late in Life." Three of his songs, including wedding favorite "Take My Hand", were featured in the movie Dirty Rice, and some of his work is also featured on the soundtracks for the movie Steel Magnolias and the television show "Broken Badges". He has recorded for the major record labels Mercury/Polygram and Mercury. His 1995 release, Back to the Bayou became the fastest-selling record ever for the independent Louisiana label Swallow Records. Toups has been featured playing the accordion on singles for many country music stars. He appears on the Mark Chesnutt No. 1 hit, "It Sure Is Monday"; on Clay Walker's "Live Laugh Love"; and on Alan Jackson's "Little Bitty". He played with Sammy Kershaw, George Jones, Mark Wills, Garth Brooks, and Ty England.

Toups is often known for wearing bright outfits during his performances. He has toured in over twenty-six countries, including in South America, Canada, Europe and the Far East. He has appeared on MTV and on the Super Bowl XXIV telecast.

== Discography ==
=== Albums ===
Year	Single	US	Label
1979	"Cajun Paradise"		Sonet
1986	Zydecajun		Mercury
1988	Johnnie Can't Dance		Mercury
1989	Blast from the Bayou	183	Mercury
1991	Fish Out of Water		Mercury
1992	Down Home Live!		MTE
1995	Back to the Bayou		Swallow
1997	Toups		New Blues
1998	More Than Just a Little		BTM
1999	The Best of Wayne Toups		New Blues
2000	Little Wooden Box		Shanachie
2004	Whoever Said It Was Easy		Shanachie
2005	Reflections of the Past		D&R
2008	The Essential Wayne Toups		New Blues
2009	Wayne Toups Live 2009		Swallow
2012	The Band Courtbouillon		Valcour
2013	2013 Live From Jazz Fest		MunchMusic
2016	Wayne Toups		Jambalaya Music

=== Singles ===
Year	Single	US Country	Album
1999	"Free Me"	66	More Than Just a Little

== See also ==
- History of Cajun Music
- List of Notable People Related to Cajun Music
- Cajun accordion
