= Hadley Castille =

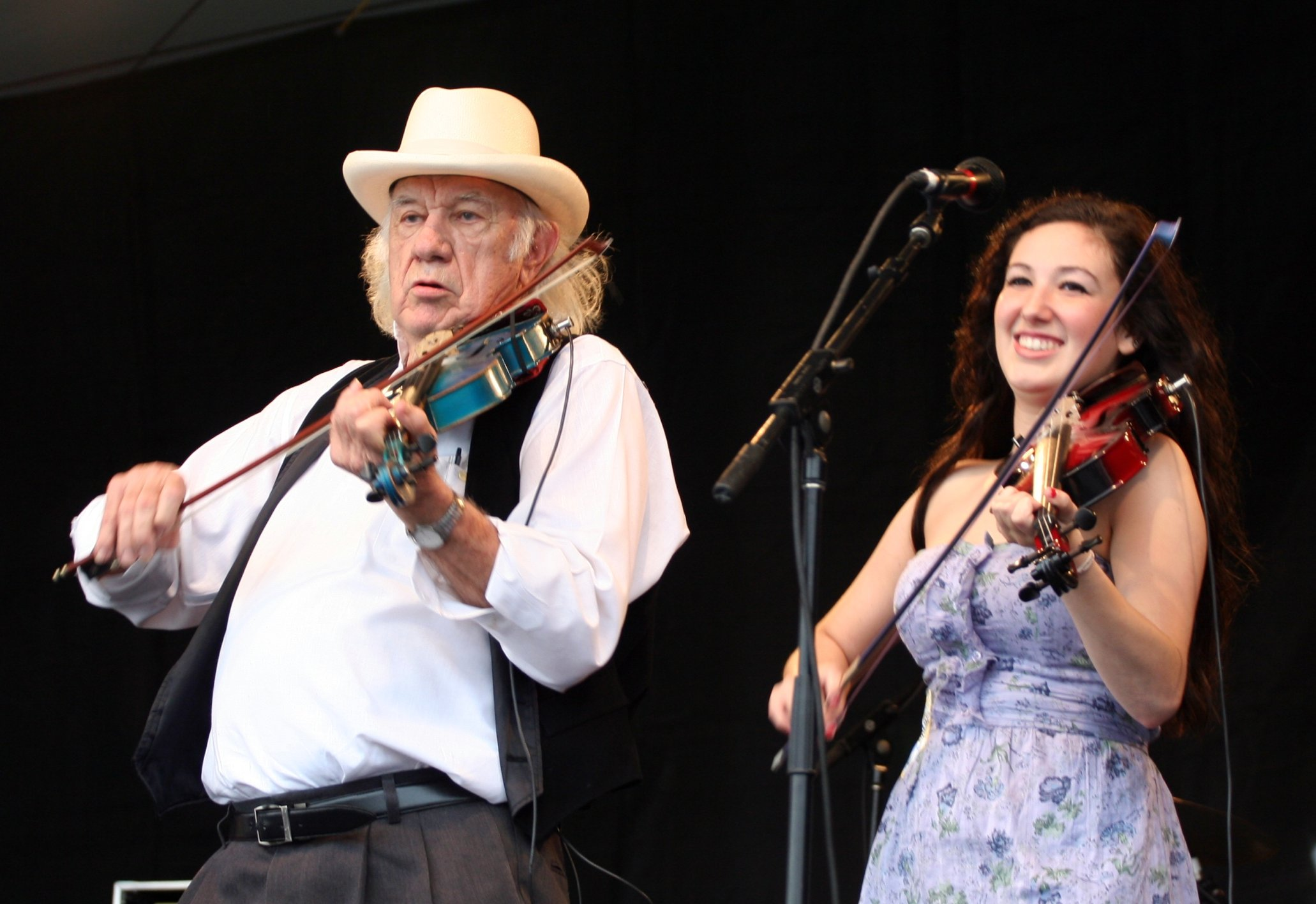
- Hadley J Castille & Sarah Jayde Williams

Background information
- Birth name: Hadley J. Castille
- Born: March 3, 1933
- Origin: Leonville, Louisiana
- Died: October 25, 2012 (aged 79)
- Genres: Cajun
- Occupation(s): Musician, fiddler
- Instrument: Fiddle
- Website: hadleyjcastille.com

Hadley J. Castille (March 3, 1933 – October 25, 2012) was a prominent Cajun fiddler.

== Early life ==
Castille was born to a Cajun French speaking family. His father was named François Castille. He learned to play the fiddle from his Uncle Cyprien Castille at around the age of 9. After moving around for a while, he ended up in Pecaniere – a small community near Leonville, LA. Here, he first heard "Jole Blon" by Harry Choates during a trip to the Silver Slipper, a grocery store and bar. The song inspired him to take up a new style of playing. In the early 1950s, he started playing at Roy's Bar in Port Barre, LA and local house parties. Also, they played on the KSLO "Amateur Hour" segments on Saturday mornings. After graduating, Castille moved to New Orleans to play in a country band. However, after four to five months he moved back to Leonville, and eventually enlisted in the US Army. The Korean War ended soon after arriving in Fort Hood, Texas. He spent his entire service in Killeen, Texas, where he played in an on base band. After service, he backed off from music to focus on family and his plumbing business.

== Festival du Voyageur ==
In the early 1980s, Castille was invited to perform at Le Festival du Voyageur, Western Canada's largest winter festival. This experience caused him to relearn old Cajun tunes and focus on sharpening his skills. He returned to the festival for the next 18 years. He started recording music and playing many festivals during this time.

== Later life ==
In his later life, Castille continued to perform with his sharecropper band, and also lead many workshops at festivals.

== Legacy ==
Castille's played Cajun music most his life. This earned Castille many awards over the years. He has been inducted into the Louisiana Hall of Fame. Also, he has received the Acadiana Folk Heritage Award from the Acadiana Arts Council. He has been inducted into the Northwestern University Hall of Master Folk Artists. His work with "200 Lines: I Must Not Speak French" has earned him a Cajun French Music Association Heritage Award. He received an honorable discharge from the United States Army having served during the Korean War. Also, his music has been heard in films, such as A Perfect World with Clint Eastwood. His granddaughter Sarah Jayde Williams is also a violinist.

== Discography ==
- 200 Lines: I Must Not Speak French Swallow 6088 (1991)
- Cajun Swamp Fiddler Swallow 6112 (1993)
- Musique de Castille Swallow 6123 (1995)
- Along the Bayou Teche Swallow 6078 (1997)
- Cajun Christmas Delta Records (1997)
- Quarante Acres et Deux Mulés (40 Acres and 2 Mules) MTE 5070-2 (2000)
- Refrait Swallow 6191 (2005)
- Hadley's Dream (Le Reve' a Hadley) Acadiana Sounds
