= Cajun accordion =

Diatonic button accordion used for playing Cajun music

Cajun Accordion
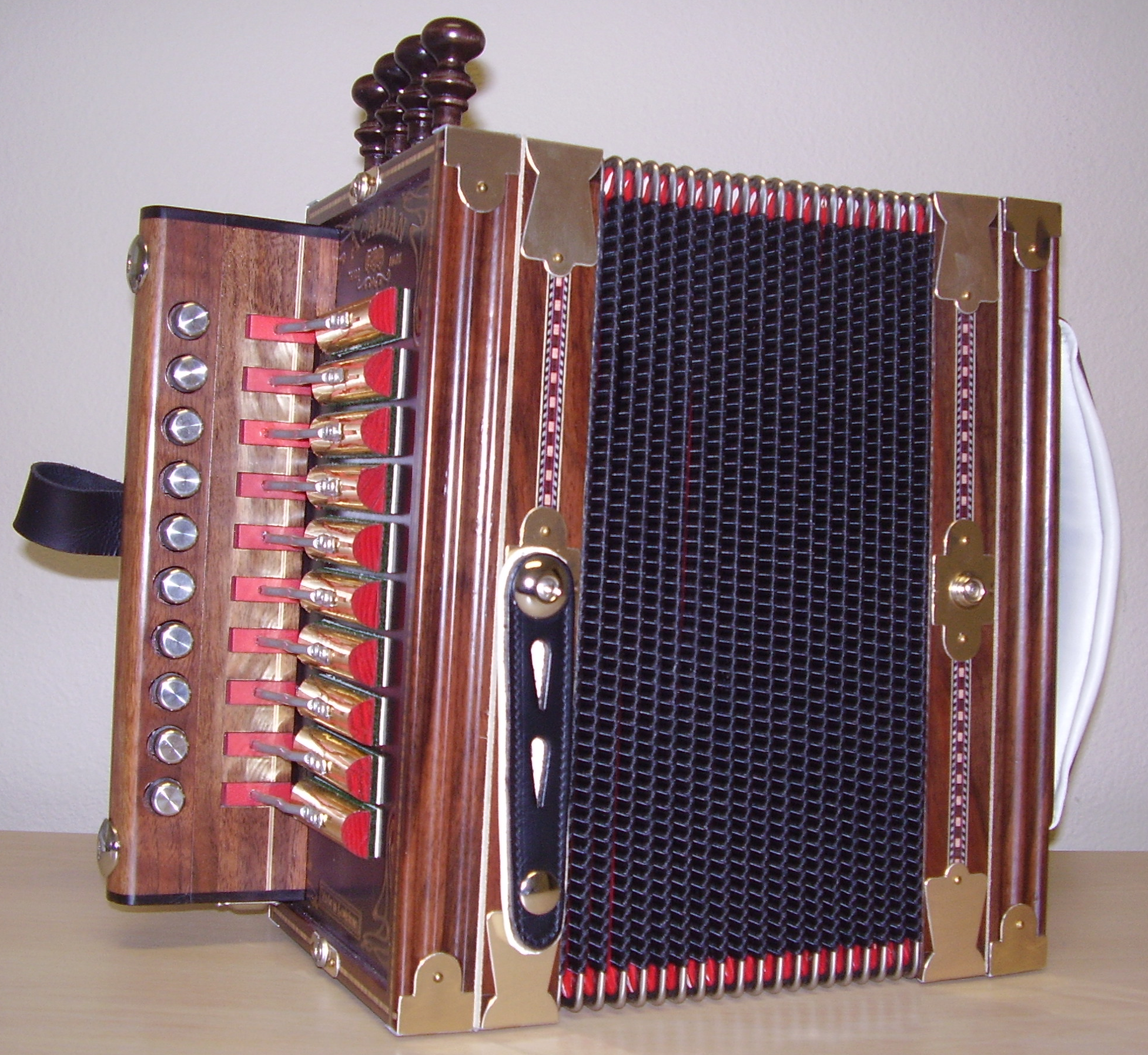
- An Acadian brand Cajun Accordion
- Other names: diatonic button accordion, melodeon
- Classification: Free-reed aerophone
- Hornbostel–Sachs classification: 412.13 (Reeds vibrate within a closely fitting slot)
- Developed: 19th century

Related instruments
- Accordion, Bandoneón, Harmonica, Harmonium

Musicians
- Joe Falcon, Iry LeJeune, Amédé Ardoin, "Bois Sec" Ardoin, Nathan Abshire

Builders
- Greg Mouton (Louisiana, United States) Marc Savoy (Louisiana, United States), Larry Miller (Louisiana, United States), Hohner (Germany), *Andre Michot (Louisiana, United States)

More articles or information
- Cajun Music, Cajun, History of Cajun Music

A Cajun accordion (in Cajun French: accordéon), also known as a squeezebox, is a single-row diatonic button accordion used for playing Cajun and Creole music.

== History ==
Many different accordions were developed in Europe throughout the 19th century, and exported worldwide. Although accordions are documented in South Louisiana as early as the mid-century, early models would not have caught on with Cajun musicians due to their tuning in A or F and hence the incompatibility with the fiddle. Accordions were brought to Acadiana in the 1890s and became popular by the early 1900s (decade), though it was initially an unaccompanied solo instrument. Popular brands were "Monarch" and "Sterling" in addition to Hohner. The accordion became more widely adopted during the 1920's as models tuned to C and D appeared, and accordions were able to play with fiddles.

The accordion fell out of favor in the 1930's, as Anglophone country music and Western swing spread into the region, and amplification allowed string bands to project more sound, first utilized by the Hackberry Ramblers. However, this trend reversed after World War II, when the accordion became popular in Cajun music once again, exemplified by Iry LeJeune.

Many of the German factories producing diatonic accordions for the United States market were destroyed during World War II. As a result, some Cajuns, such as Sidney Brown, began producing their own instruments, based on the popular one-row German accordions but with modifications to suit the nuances of the Cajun playing style. Since the end of World War II, there has been a surge in the number of Cajun accordion makers in Louisiana, as well as several in Texas. While early-postwar accordion builders had to rely on parts salvaged from older accordions and Hohners, since about 1980 builders tend to use fine imported bellows, reeds, and woods.

== Construction ==
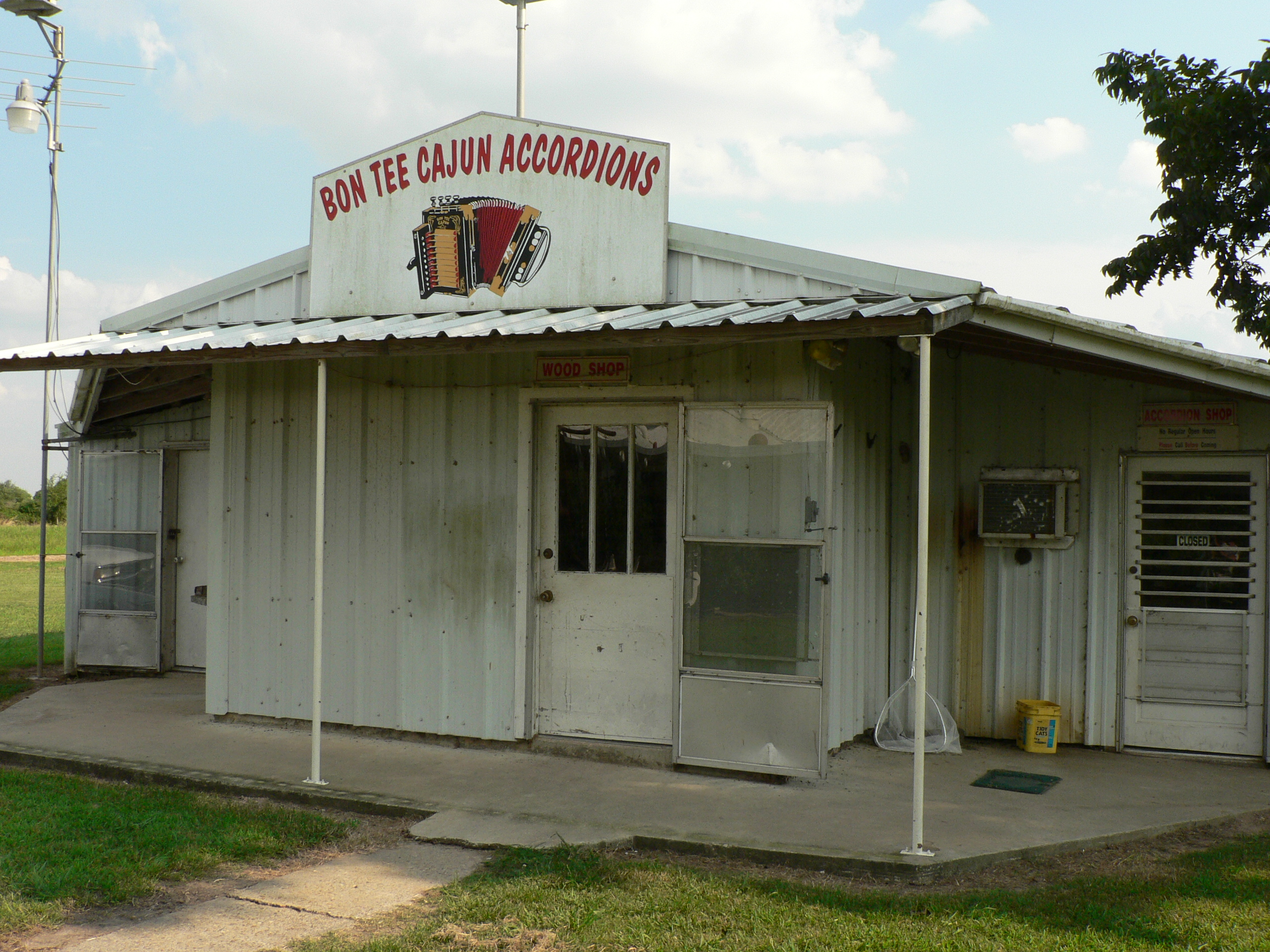
Shop in Iota, Louisiana where Larry Miller builds his Cajun accordions.

The Cajun accordion is generally defined as a single-row diatonic accordion, as compared to multiple-row instruments commonly used in Irish, Italian, polka, and other styles of music. The Cajun accordion has four reed ranks, i.e., four reeds for each melody button, and each reed bank is controlled by a corresponding stop or knob on the top of the instrument. The four reed banks are tuned in octaves; one at a low octave, two at a middle octave, and one at a high octave. Most Cajun, but not zydeco, accordionists prefer "dry" tuning, meaning that the two middle-octave reeds are tuned to precisely the same pitch. ("Wet" tuning, by contrast, creates a tremolo effect by offsetting one of the reeds' tuning slightly.)

The standard number of melody buttons is ten, with two buttons on the left-hand side: one for the bass note and one for the chord. The tonic note and major chord of the key play on when the bellows are pushed, and the dominant note and major chord when pulled (for instance, C major and G major respectively in the key of C).

Visually, the Cajun accordion typically displays its treble flaps rather than obscuring them behind a grill, as is common with many other accordions. Spoon-shaped levers found on the bass side of German accordions are also replaced with buttons. Inlays, or a solid black finish (in homage to Monarch and Sterling), are popular.

Louisiana-constructed accordions are usually built in small backyard shops like Marc Savoy's Acadian brand and Larry Miller's Bon Cajun brand. Clarence "Junior" Martin of Lafayette Louisiana is a Master Craftsman who also builds accordions in his shop.

== Characteristics ==
The accordion was favored for adoption by Cajun musicians due to how loud it was, unamplified, in noisy dance halls; its ability to stay in tune; and its durability.

The most common tuning utilized is the key of C, although the key of D is also relatively common. Some rarer accordions are constructed in the key of B flat. Cajun accordions are traditionally tuned to a Just Intonation.

== Notable players ==
Although the instrument is called a Cajun accordion, both zydeco and creole musicians play the Cajun accordion with a zydeco and creole sound respectively. Each musician below is considered important in influencing accordion technique and image.

- Nathan Abshire
- Alphonse "Bois Sec" Ardoin
- Amédé Ardoin
- Lee Benoit
- Jackie Caillier
- Boozoo Chavis
- Geno Delafose
- John Delafose
- Dewey Balfa
- Joe Falcon
- Iry LeJeune
- Eddie LeJeune
- Steve Riley
- Paul Daigle
- Aldus Roger
- Marc Savoy
- Jo-El Sonnier
- Wayne Toups
- Lawrence Walker
- William LaBouve
- Felton LeJeune
- Terrance Simien and the Zydeco Experience

== Manufacturers and builders ==
A 1999 article noted 29 accordion builders in Southwest Louisiana, as well as one in New Orleans and one in Texas.

- Hohner (Germany)
- Andre Michot (Louisiana, United States)
- Larry Miller (Louisiana, United States)
- Marc Savoy (Louisiana, United States)
- Greg Mouton (Louisiana, United States)
- Clarence Martin Jr (Louisiana, United States)

== Gallery ==
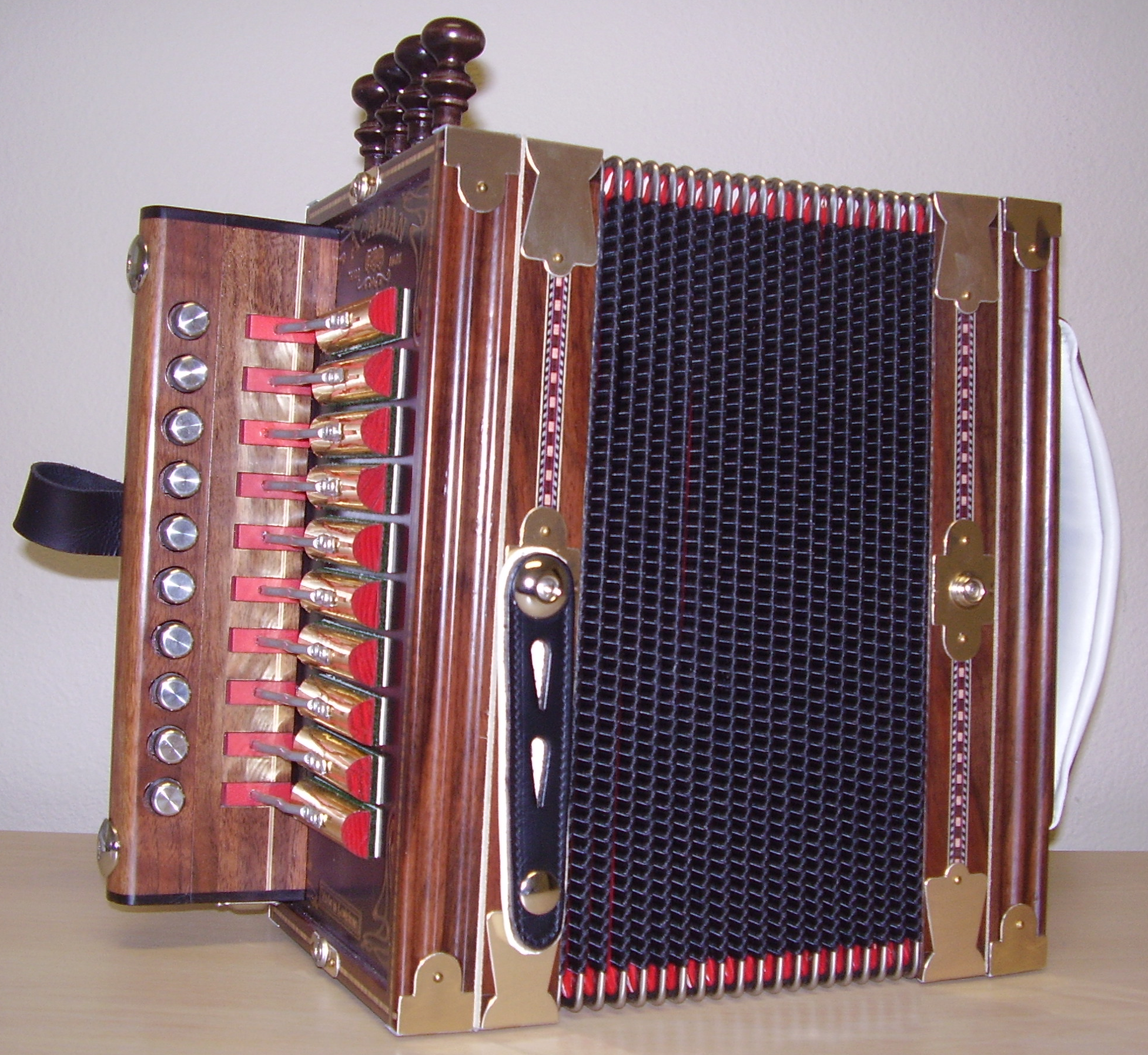
Front

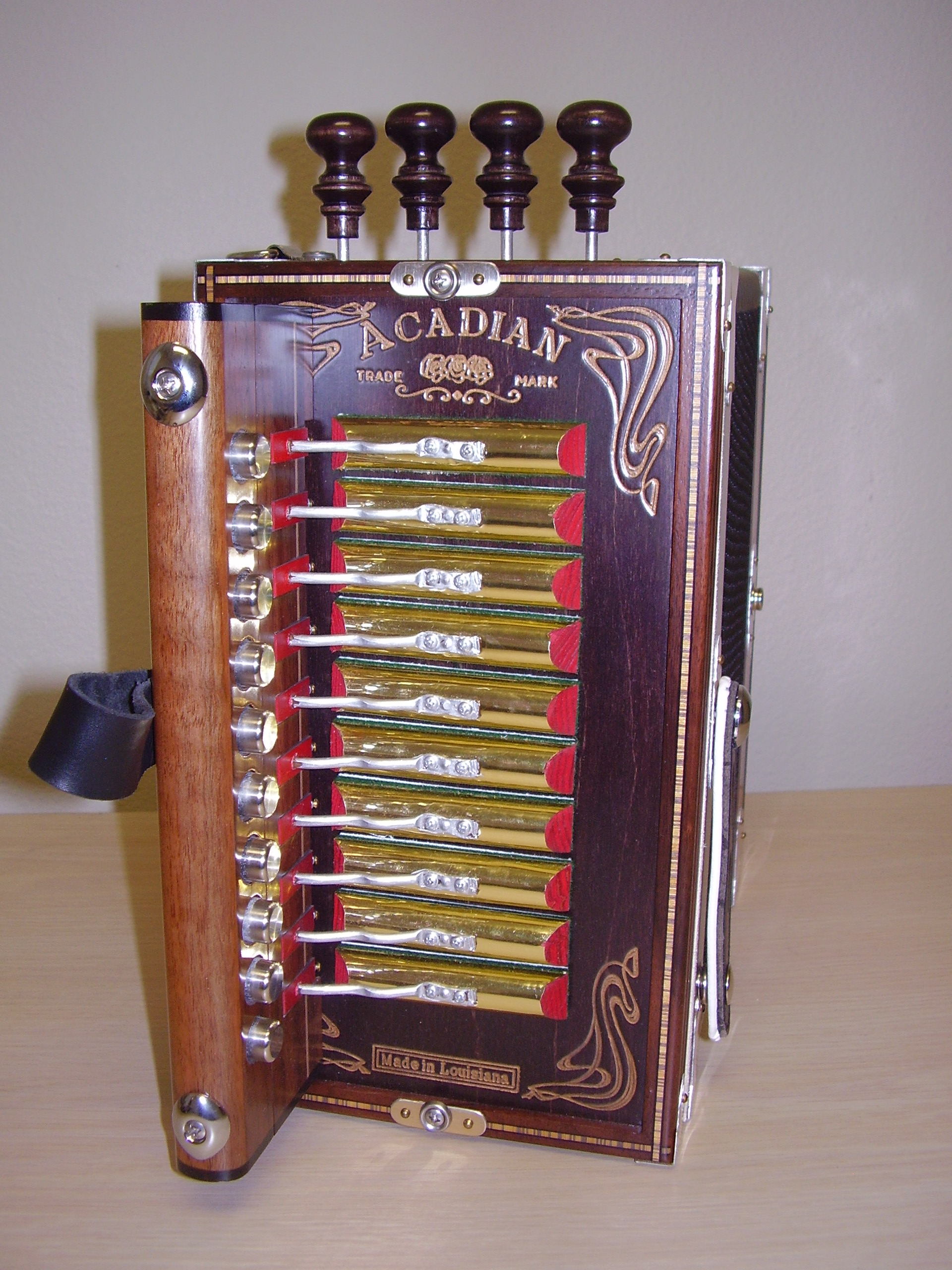
Keys

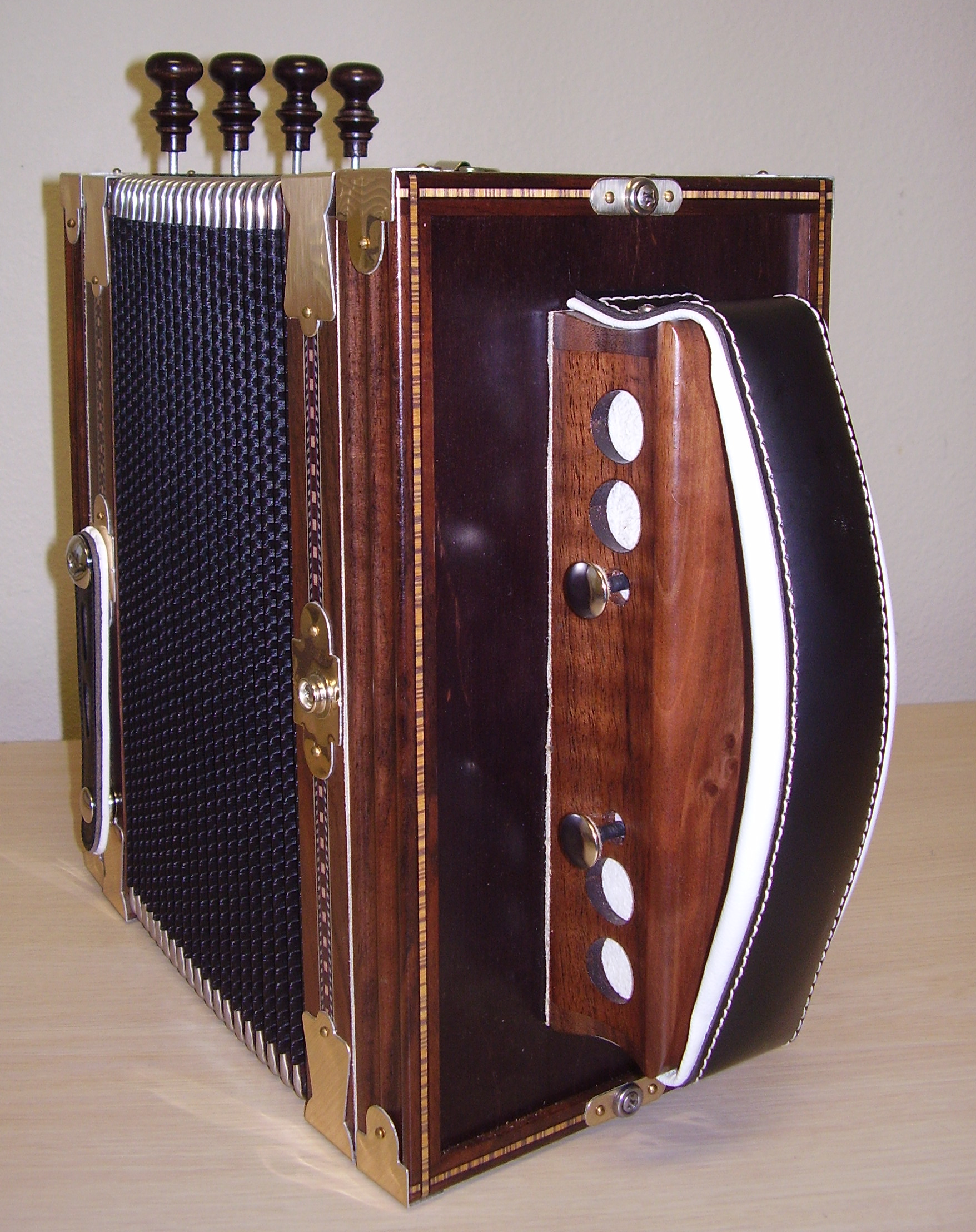
The front left-hand side (bass side) of a Cajun accordion

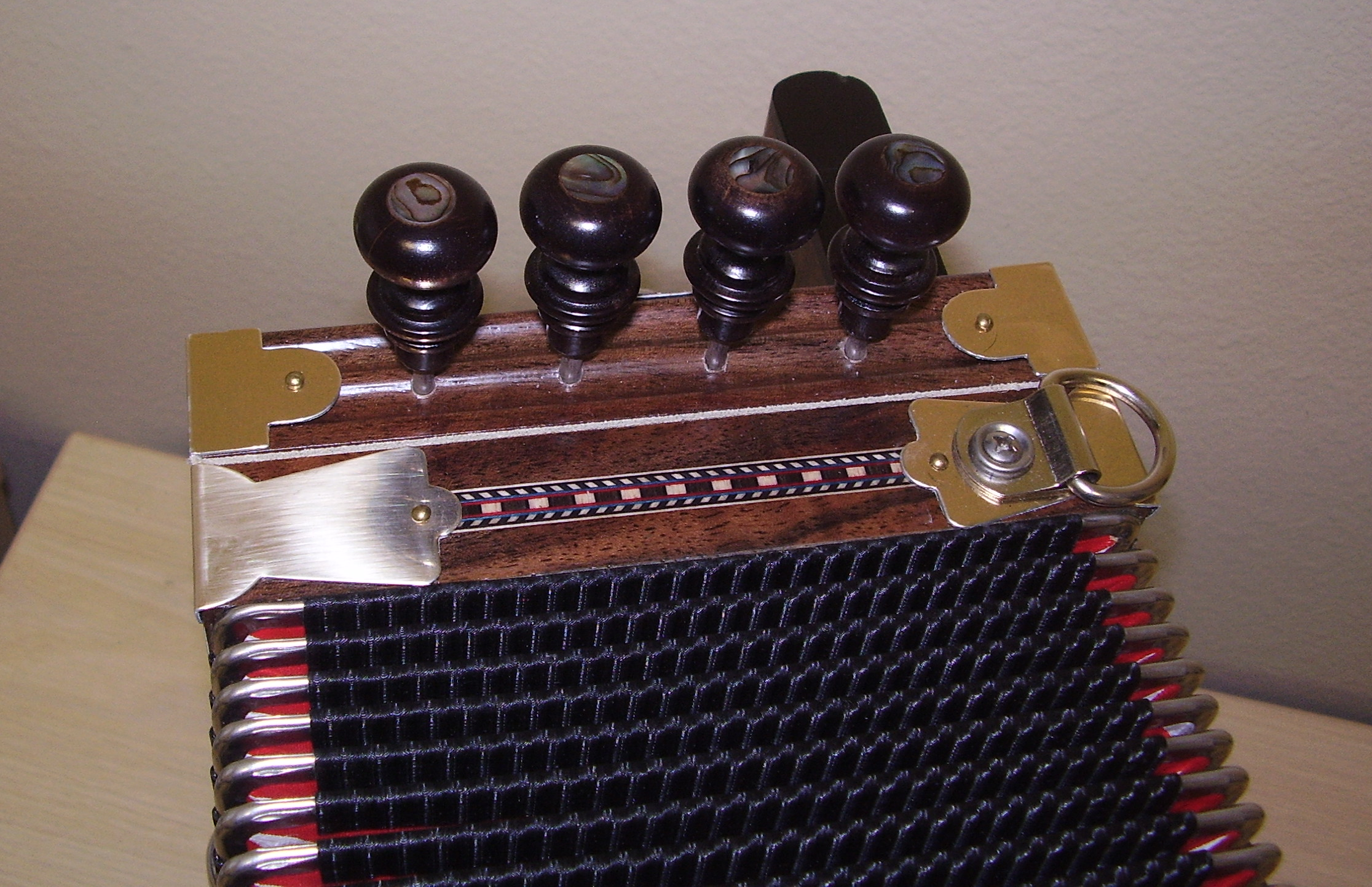
The knobs or stops control the number of reeds sounding

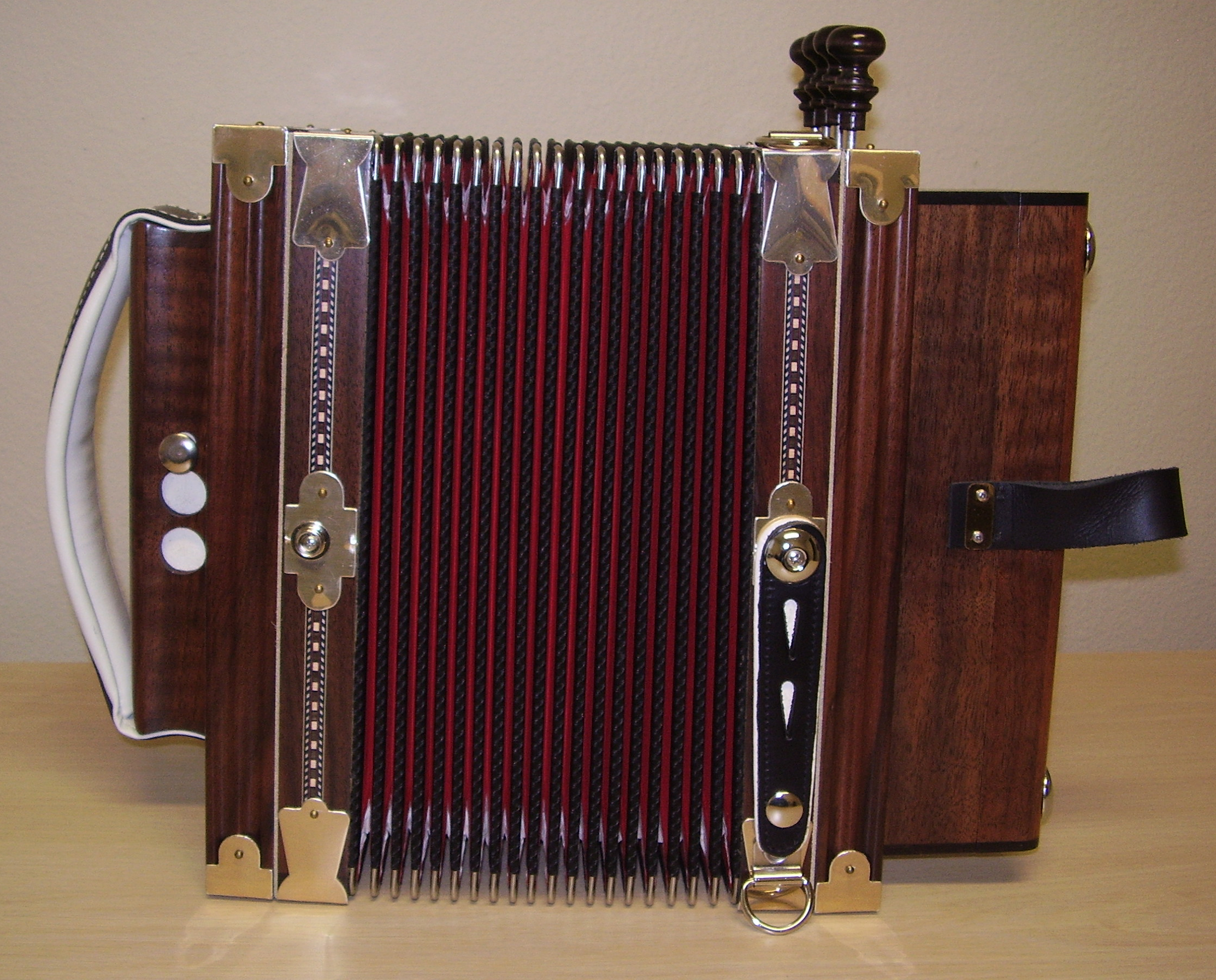
The back side

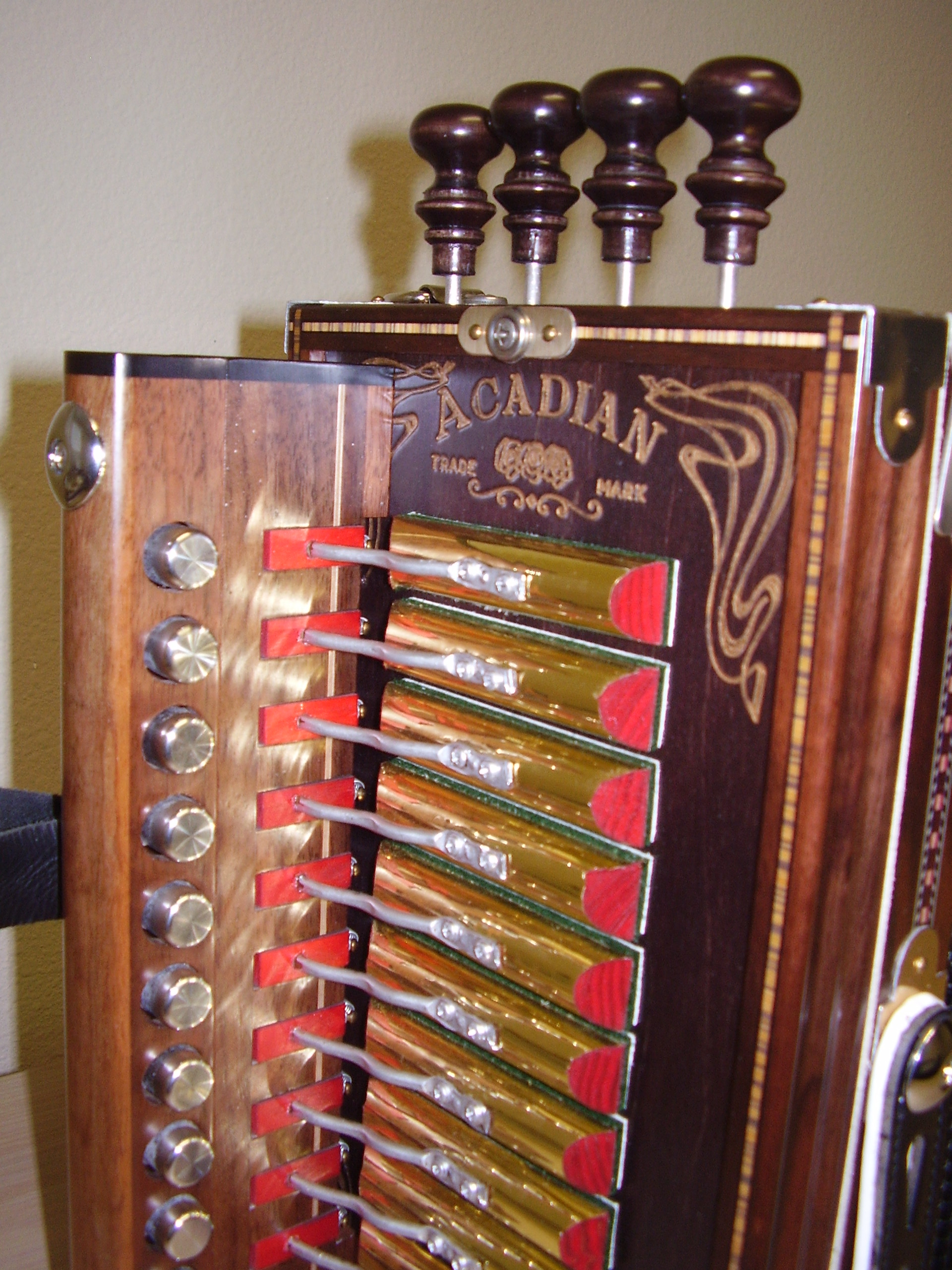
A close up of the keys

== See also ==
- Bandoneon
- Diatonic button accordion
- Piano accordion
- Cajun French Music Association
- List of people related to Cajun music
- History of Cajun music
- Fiddle
