= Alliance Française of New Orleans =

New Orleans nonprofit organization and cultural center

Alliance Française de La Nouvelle-Orléans
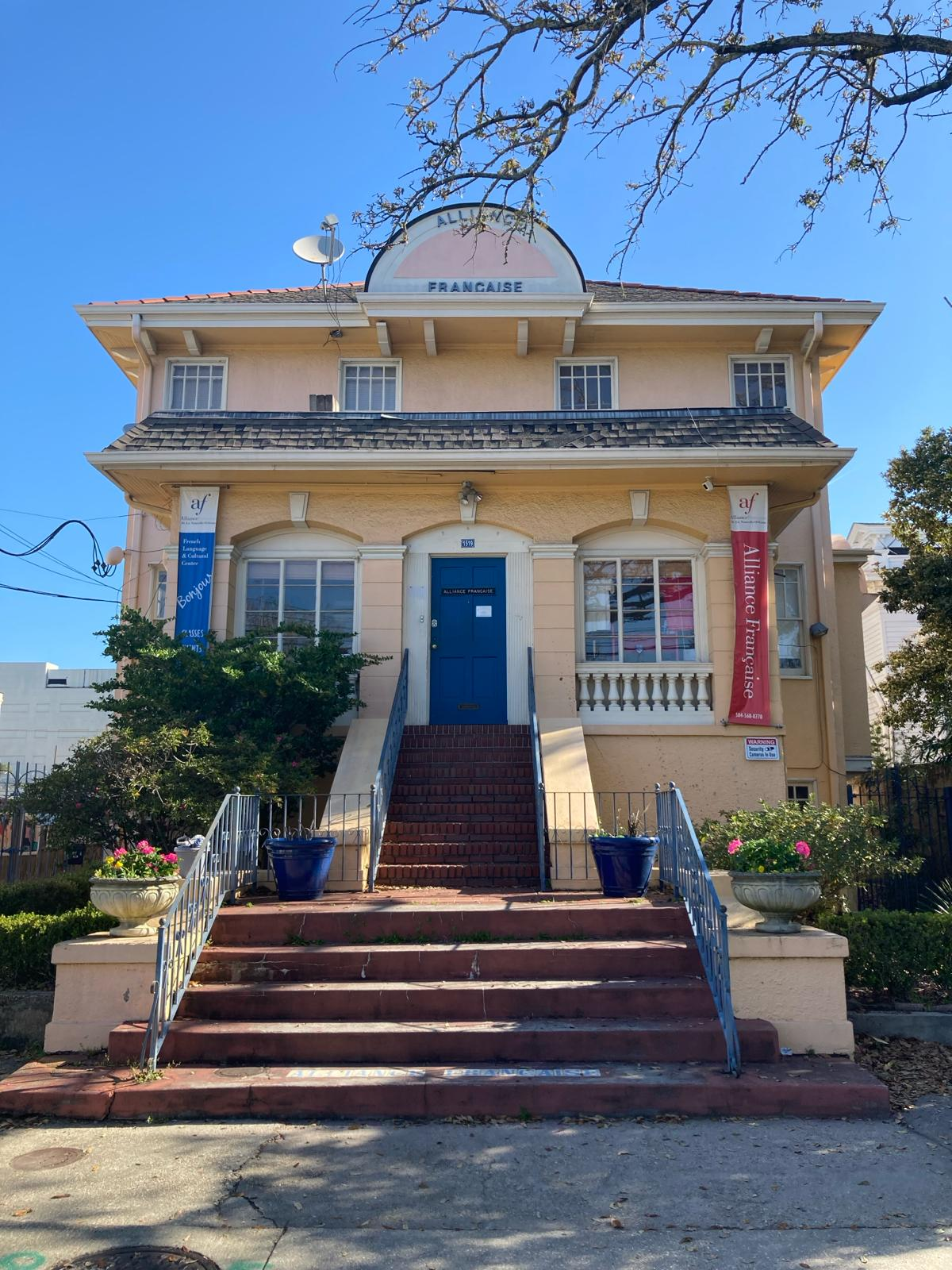
- Type: French cultural and language center
- Established: 1984
- Founders: Daniel Lacoste de Monterville, Josette Brandt, Jean Charpentier
- President: Sophie Capmartin
- Director: Alan Nobili
- Students: 800 admissions in 2025
- Location: New Orleans, Louisiana, 70130, United States; 29°56′0.2465″N 90°4′47.0766″W
- Website: af-neworleans.org

Founded in 1984, the Alliance Française of New Orleans (AFNO) is a 501(c)(3) organization and cultural center dedicated to promoting the French language and francophone cultures in New Orleans and Gulf South area. It is located in the historic Garden District, New Orleans.

It is one of the chapters of international network of the Alliance Française

== History ==
In 1888, the Athénée Louisianais, (est. 1876) a francophone literary society founded in New Orleans, came into contact with the Alliance Française and later joined the Alliances Françaises network.

In 1902, Alcee Fortier, professor of Tulane University and president of the Athénée Louisianais is vice-president of the newly created Federation de L'Alliance Francaise in the United States.

In 1936, the Athénée Louisianais no longer published literary works and becomes a simple Alliance Française chapter that publishes its annual accounts.

In 1975, Josette Brandt arrived in New Orleans and began efforts to convince the French general consul of that time to allow her to recreate a chapter of Alliance Francaise, where she had worked in Lima, Peru. She convinced them to let her begin a Consular School in the rooms downstairs from the General Consulate on St. Charles Avenue.

In 1983, Jean Charpentier arrived as Attaché Culturel. He immediately seized upon the idea of an Alliance Française in New Orleans. He convinced M. Daniel de Monterville to try and find funds to begin the project from people in New Orleans who were interested in cultural affairs.

On January 2, 1984, M. Charpentier met with Mme Brandt and M de Monterville in the office of an attorney to sign the articles of incorporation. M. de Monterville was the first president of the board of directors for the new non-profit corporation and Mme Brandt was the treasurer.

In 1987 l’Alliance Française found a building it could afford, on its present location at 1519 Jackson Avenue. The school was moved from the consulate building in 1988 and began to hold classes on one floor only. The second floor was renovated two years later, giving us several more classrooms.

Today, it counts more than 650 members and more than 800 enrollments in French classes a year. Its operating budget comes from tuitions, memberships and contributions (individuals, corporations and foundations.)

With a Board of Directors of 16 members, it has 4 employees, 28 teachers and c. 70 regular volunteers.

=== Executive Directors ===
- 1984-1989 Mme Josette Brandt
- 1988-1991 M. Roland Thomas
- 1991-1997 Mme Nellie Sadoun
- 1997-1998 M. Laurent Innocenzi
- 1998-2004 Mme Brigitte Gomane
- 2004-2005 M. Freddy DuPuy
- 2006 : Mme Alexandra Stafford
- 2007-2008 M. Michel Depresz
- 2008- Mlle. Alexandra Drame (Administrative Assistant)
- 2010 - 2012 Lilian Cadet
- 2012 - 2016 Aurélie Champvert
- 2016 - 2020 Audrey Nikitine
- 2020 - 2024 Emilie Georget
- 2024 - Alan Nobili

== French language center ==
All instructors are native French speakers emphasizing conversation and a contextual approach to language learning.

The Alliance Française de La Nouvelle-Orléans provides:

- French classes for all ages and levels
- Online classes
- Louisiana Creole classes
- Cultural workshops
- Literature and conversation groups
- Cultural and social events

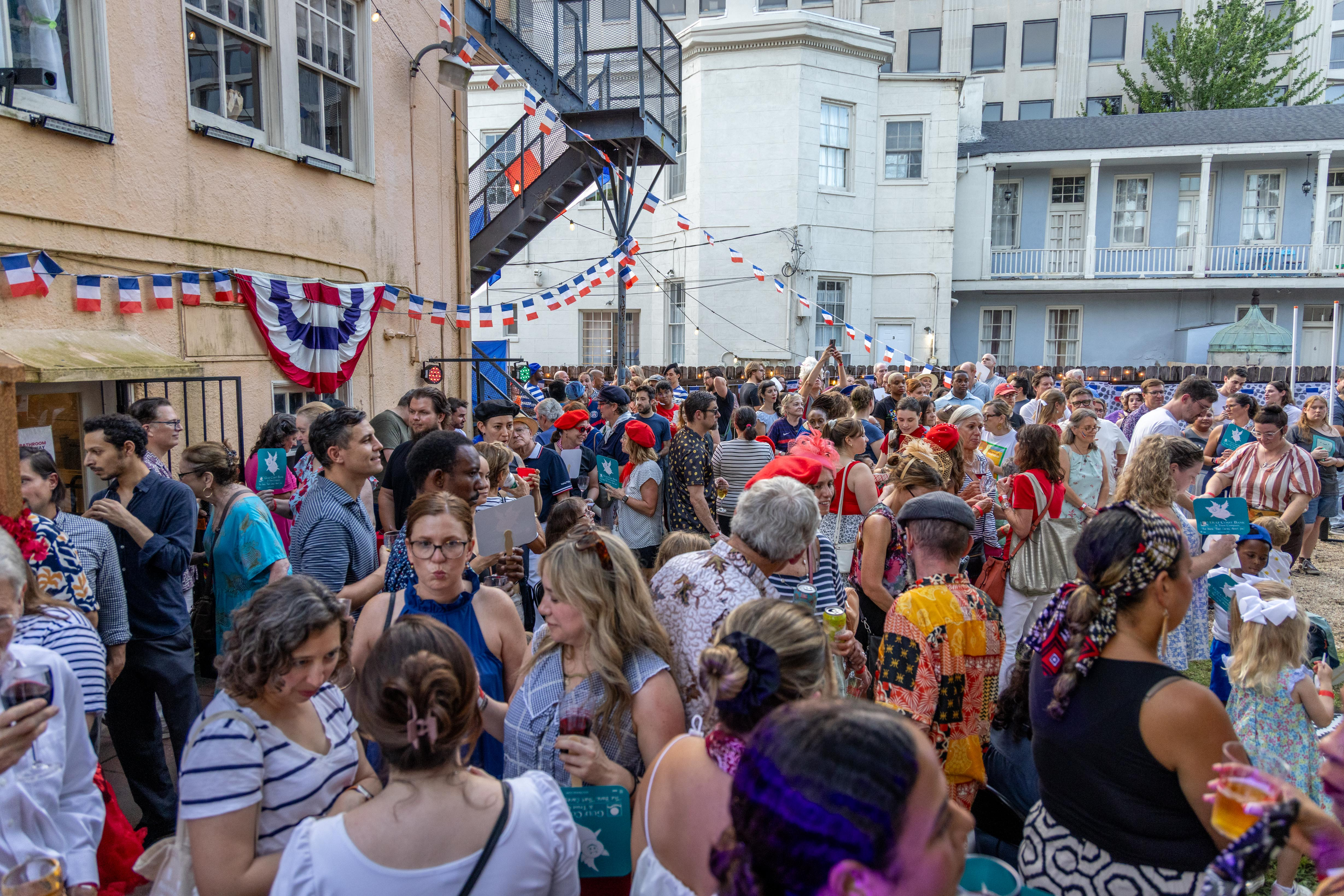
Bastille Day Celebration 2025

The Alliance also offers the Test d'évaluation du français certificate (TEF), a diploma delivered by the Chamber of Commerce and Industry of Paris and DELF diploma (DELF), a diploma delivered by France Éducation international

== Cultural and social events ==
L'Alliance Française of New Orleans offers a wide variety of social activities and cultural events, including festivals, lectures, concerts, films, exhibits, guided tours to museums, "wine and cheese" parties, and discussion groups.

The AFNO partners every year with international and local organizations and festivals to promote francophone cultures.

The cultural team organizes more than 170 events, including many at partners' venues. Local partners include the New Orleans Jazz Museum, Historic New Orleans Collection, Tulane University, the French General Consulate, New Orleans Public Library, The National World War II Museum, Villa Albertine, CODOFIL, New Orleans Gold,Fondation Louisiane, Embassy of France, Washington, D.C., Lycée Français de la Nouvelle-Orléans, Loyola University and many more.

March is dedicated to Francophonie month with several events every year.

Each year, Alliance Française of New Orleans organizes Bastille Day and celebrates New Orleans' French heritage and the French national holiday.

Since 2022, the Alliance Française of New Orleans has co-organized My French Book Fest, an annual festival celebrating French-language children's literature and Louisiana's Francophone heritage, alongside Villa Albertine and the Consulate General of France in New Orleans.

Since 2025, Alliance Française of New Orleans present the Rêve On Community Awards to honor individuals and organizations whose commitment, creativity, and generosity strengthen the Francophone community.

== The library ==
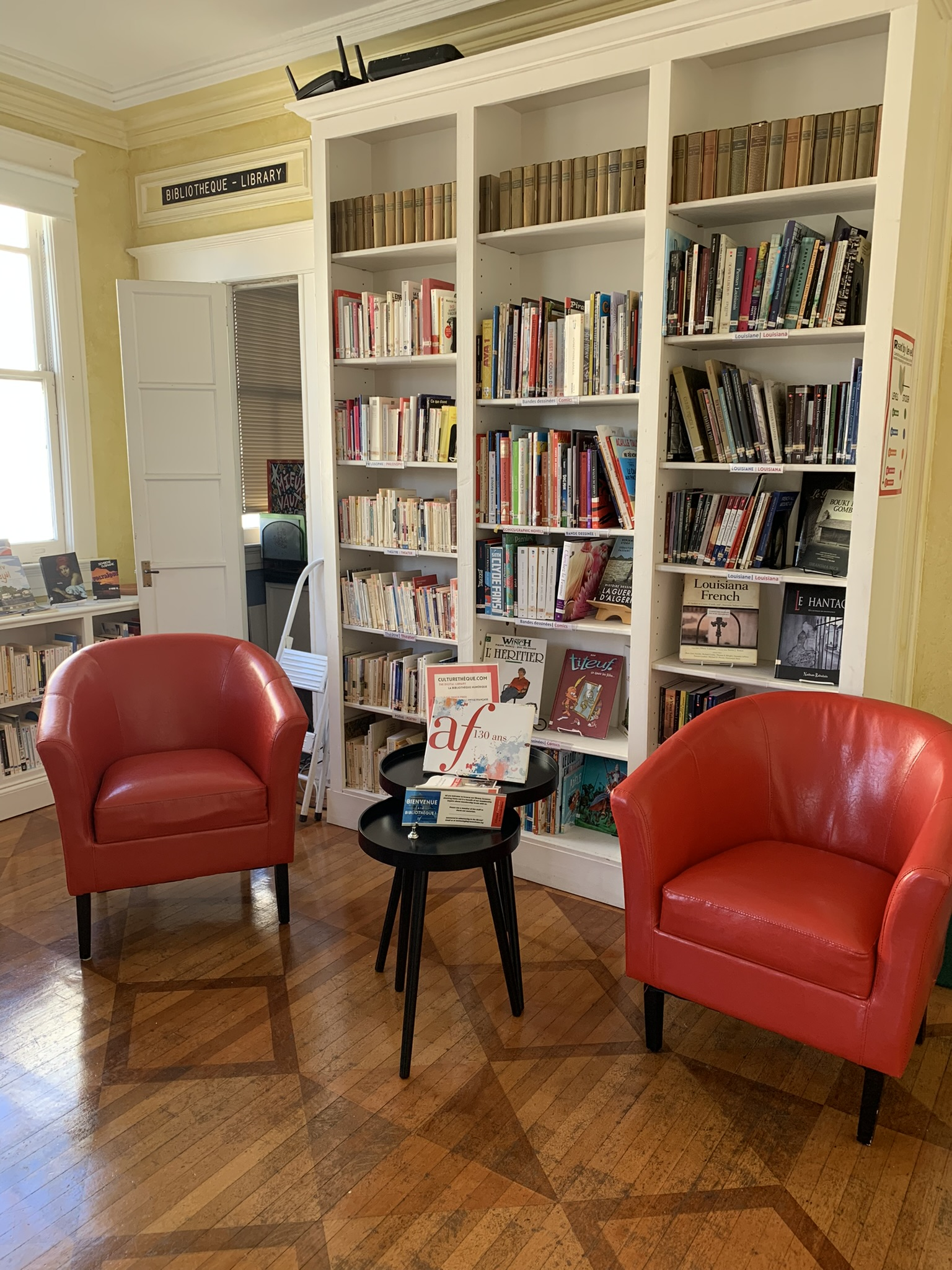
AFNO Library

The library has a collection of over 3,000 books, DVDs and CDs. The collections are open to the public; AF members may borrow materials for free.

The library's collections focus on contemporary French and francophone cultures in Louisiana and abroad.

In addition to on-site collections, the Alliance offers access to the first French e-library in the United States, Culturethèque, with more than 200 magazines and newspapers, e-books, bandes dessinées, and music.

The Alliance also sells records and French books.

== The public ==
Students range from children aged 12 months to seniors; the average age is 35 years.

The Alliance communicates regularly to 7,000 individuals through mailed brochures, blast e-mails, its website and via Facebook and Linkedin.

== Awards ==
Alan Nobili, Executive Director of the Alliance Française de la Nouvelle-Orléans, was awarded the Key to the City of New Orleans

On December 18, 2025, Alan Nobili, Executive Director of the Alliance Française de la Nouvelle-Orléans, was awarded the Key to the City of New Orleans in recognition of his contributions to cultural diplomacy and the promotion of the French language and Francophone heritage in Louisiana.

== See also ==
- Alliance Française
- French Louisiana
- Louisiana French
- History of New Orleans
- Garden District, New Orleans
