= Les Éditions Tintamarre =

Louisiana French & heritage language publishing house

Les Éditions Tintamarre is a publishing house founded in 2003 that specializes in the heritage languages of Louisiana.. The press focuses on conserving the history of French and Creole writers while supporting the future of Francophone literature in Louisiana. It operates under the auspices of the university press of the Centenary College of Louisiana.

== History ==
Les Éditions Tintamarre was founded by Dana Kress, who currently serves as the Editor-in-Chief and Director. The press has been recognized numerous times, either directly or for one of its published authors, by the Académie française; first in 2014 when Kirby Jambon received the Prix Henri de Régnier for his book Petites Communions: Poèmes, chansons et jonglements, which included a monetary award of 5,000 € and again in 2024 when Kress received the Prix du Rayonnement de la langue et de la littérature françaises (Prize for the Influence of French Language and Literature) from the Fondation Broquette-Gonin, awarded as a silver-gilt medal (médaille de vermeil), for his work with the press. This annual prize, established in 1960, recognizes French or foreign personalities who have rendered particular services to French language and literature.

== Mission ==
According to the publisher's stated mission, Les Éditions Tintamarre seeks to explore and preserve the cultural heritage of Louisiana's diverse populations through their minority languages. The press recognizes that the Louisiana Purchase brought throusands of future American citizens whose varied heritages allowed them to leave behind "a rich and varied record of their life in the new world" through newspapers, manuscripts, and songs.

The press aims to present this experience through the words of those who lived it or continue to live it, working with what it describes as Louisiana's "living literature." The mission statement emphasizes that this heritage—encompassing Cajun, Creole, Native American, and immigrant traditions—serves to defend and illustrate Louisiana's francophone identity through the voices of immigrant novelists, Native American storytellers, Creole singers, and Cajune Poets.

== Publications and authors ==
Les Éditions Tintamarre has published works by various Louisiana francophone authors, including historical figures such as Sidonie de La Houssaye, Charles Testut, and Alfred Mercier, as well as contemporary writers like Kirby Jambon and Barry Jean Ancelet (who also writes under the pen name of Jean Arceneaux).

In 2023, the press published Contes merveilleux: Louisiane, 2023, a collection featuring works from the first Louisiana Fairy Tale Contest (Concours de contes merveilleux de la Louisiane), which was sponsored by Centenary College, Les Éditions Tintamarre, and the French Consulate of New Orleans. The anthology includes contributions from forty participants, with an average age of 23 years. According to the publisher's description, the collection demonstrates "the vitality of French in Louisiana at present" and represents multiple generations of francophone Louisiana writers. The submitted manuscripts were evaluated anonymously by three poet laureates representing French-speaking Louisiana: Kirby Jambon, Jean Arceneaux (predecessor), and Zachary Richard (French-speaking Louisiana's first poet laureate)

== Editorial staff ==
Les Éditions Tintamarre is led by Editor-in-Chief Dana Kress, professor emeritus of French. at Centenary College of Louisiana, with Ryan Atticus Doherty, also of Centenary College, serving as the Associate Editor.

The editorial and management committee, as of 2025, includes scholars from various universities: Barry Jean Ancelet (University of Louisiana at Lafayette), Andia Augustin-Billy (Centenary College), Evelyne Bornier (Auburn University), Clint Bruce (Université Sainte-Anne), Amanda LaFleur (independent researcher), Chris Michaelides (University of Louisiana at Monroe), Nathan Rablais (University of Louisiana, Lafayette), and Robin White (Nicholls State University, Thibodaux).
