= Council for the Development of French in Louisiana =

Louisiana state agency

Coordinates: 30°13′18.55″N 92°1′6.4″W

- Conseil pour le développement du français en Louisiane
- Seal of CODOFIL

State agency overview
- Formed: July 20, 1968
- Jurisdiction: Louisiana
- Headquarters: 735 Jefferson Street, Lafayette, LA 70501
- Annual budget: $609,286 USD (2016)
- State agency executives: Dr. William Arceneaux, President; Peggy Feehan, Executive Director
- Parent department: Louisiana Department of Culture, Recreation and Tourism
- Website: www.crt.state.la.us/cultural-development/codofil/index

The Council for the Development of French in Louisiana (CODOFIL; French: Conseil pour le développement du français en Louisiane) is Louisiana's Office of Francophone Affairs (French: Agence des affaires francophones). It is a state agency whose multiple legislative mandates include developing opportunities to use the French language in tourism, economic development, culture, education and international relations. CODOFIL is governed by a board of 23 members and administratively placed within the Louisiana Office of Cultural Development's Department of Culture, Recreation and Tourism, overseen by the Lieutenant Governor. CODOFIL is the only state agency in the United States whose purpose is to serve a linguistic population.

Today, CODOFIL's role is to promote and support French immersion and French as a second language in education; it acts as a partner to the Louisiana Department of Education (LDOE), whose role is to manage Louisiana's school districts. CODOFIL continues to recruit and sponsor French, Belgian and Canadian associate teachers as per its accords with those countries, who are placed alongside local teachers upon LDOE's recommendation. In recent years, teachers have also been recruited from French-speaking countries in Africa: Cameroon, Senegal, and the Ivory Coast. CODOFIL encourages Louisiana Francophones to continue transmission of the state's heritage language via its scholarship program (providing opportunities for pedagogical advancement) and the Escadrille Louisiane program (which allows non-native speakers to perfect French at the Université de Rennes in exchange for a minimum 3-year teaching commitment of French in Louisiana).

CODOFIL has also worked to instill pride in all Louisiana Francophones in their linguistic identity rather than to uphold one variety of French language or another.

== Mission and vision ==
The Council for the Development of French in Louisiana's mission is to "work toward the creation of an eco-system that permits the development of French in the economic, educational, cultural and professional sectors and in which Louisiana's French and Creole speakers are valorized in their cultural and linguistic identity." It seeks to "provide access to economic, educational, cultural and professional opportunities in French to all Louisianians." CODOFIL endorses revitalization of the French language in Louisiana through French immersion programs in schools, and CODOFIL does this by inviting French-speaking teachers from French-speaking communities around the world to Louisiana. In order for schools to have teachers for the immersion program, schools must send requests for teachers to CODOFIL first, then CODOFIL selects teachers from the list of applicants that fit with the schools' criteria for the immersion program and send them to teach the immersion programs there. CODOFIL also endorses the Cajun Music Festival as a way to promote Cajun culture through Cajun music and keep the Cajun tradition alive.

== Board ==
CODOFIL originally consisted of a chairman and an advisory committee, all appointed by the governor of Louisiana. Today it is administered by a president, an executive director, and a board of as many as 23 non-paid directors. In addition to the governor, various Louisiana organizations nominate and select board members, who serve for a term of four years.

== History ==
The Council for the Development of French in Louisiana (CODOFIL) was established in 1968 to promote the preservation of French language and culture in Louisiana. The Louisiana state legislature has greatly shifted its stance on the status of French. Since the passage of Legislative Act No. 409 in 1968, the Louisiana governor is granted the authorization "to establish the Council for the Development of Louisiana-French" and that the agency is to consist of no more than fifty members, including a chairman. The name was soon changed to CODOFIL and was granted the power to "do anything possible and necessary to encourage the development, usage and preservation of French as it exists in Louisiana".

James R. Domengeaux, a former state legislator and former United States Congressman of ethnic French descent, was the driving force behind CODOFIL's creation. A semi-retired attorney at the time, Domengeaux began his crusade for restoring French in Louisiana after Senator Edgar G. "Sonny" Mouton, Jr., of Lafayette obtained passage of an "urge-and-request" resolution for Louisiana school boards to help reverse the decline of the use of the French language within the state. Domengeaux traveled around Louisiana to gain support for his campaign to make Louisiana a bilingual state through French language education. By the spring of 1968, Domengeaux had gained enough interest from the public and support from officials, to present his plan to the legislature. Legislators, such as J. Burton Angelle of Breaux Bridge voted to create CODOFIL, and the measure was signed into law in July 1968 by Governor John McKeithen. The law empowered CODOFIL to "do any and all things necessary to accomplish the development, utilization, and preservation of the French language ... for the cultural, economic, and tourist[ic] benefit of the State."

== Criticism ==
Although CODOFIL aims to promote the French language and culture in Louisiana, this does not come without controversies among critics in Louisiana.

=== Teaching Standard French vs Louisiana French ===
A common criticism is that CODOFIL emphasizes education in Standard French over the local Louisiana French for economic purposes instead of cultural purposes.

Critics claim that not only does CODOFIL attempt to homogenize the type of French dialect through inviting foreign Francophone teachers over relying on local French-speaking Cajuns and Creoles for the French language immersion program, CODOFIL also homogenizes French culture in Louisiana by prioritizing a Cajun identity over Creole identity when it comes to Louisiana's Francophone identity.

Despite this, a survey conducted on the French immersion program shows that a majority of the teachers in the immersion program support integration of Cajun culture and Louisiana French into the curriculum, with 69% saying yes to teaching Cajun or Louisiana French in the curriculum, and 72% for Franco-Louisianan cultural aspect relating to the Louisiana French language, although the issue still remains for Louisiana Creole, with 90% of the teachers in the survey saying no to integrating Creole into the curriculum in contrast to Louisiana French.

=== Commercialization & Commodification of Cajun Culture ===
Another criticism of CODOFIL's approach to cultural revival through festivals comes from critics such as the musician James Bau Graves, who believe that CODOFIL commodifies Cajun culture through music festivals and cultural activities and conserving it for tourism instead of preserving it. Graves believes that the commercialization of Cajun culture prevents it from being preserved because it hinders any attempts for the culture to adapt to the modern era and homogenizes Cajun culture to a commodity.

On the other hand, Barry Jean Ancelet finds that the commercialization of Cajun culture allows more exposure to tourists and the international community. Ancelet believes that exposure to Cajun culture allows appreciation from the international community and helps make cultural preservation and revitalization possible by bolstering cultural pride and funding for the community.

== See also ==
- French in the United States
- List of language regulators
- Language revival
- Acadiana
- Curtis Joubert
- Armand Brinkhaus
