= William Arceneaux =

American historian

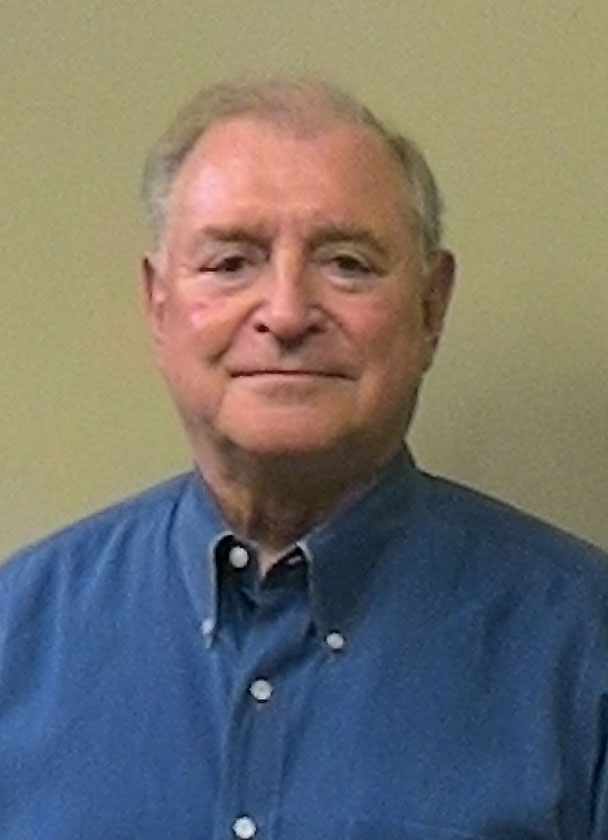
Dr. William Arceneaux

William Arceneaux (born August 19, 1941) is a Louisiana higher education official, an American professor, historian, writer, and Louisiana native. Arceneaux is president of the Council for the Development of French in Louisiana (CODOFIL), having been elected in January 2011.

Distinguished visiting lecturer in history at Tulane University in New Orleans (2007 to 2012) and adjunct professor of history at Louisiana State University in Baton Rouge, Arceneaux is director and member of the board of trustees of the Foundation for Excellence in Louisiana Public Broadcasting (FELPB).

== Career ==
Arceneaux was president of the Louisiana Association of Independent Colleges and Universities (1987-2007), Louisiana's first Commissioner of Higher Education (1975-1987), executive director of the Louisiana Coordinating Council for Higher Education (1972-1975), president of the State Higher Education Executive Officer's Association (1979) (public sector), and president of the National Association of Independent Colleges and Universities State Executives (2002) (private sector).

Arceneaux is founder and chair of La Fondation Louisiane, a not-for-profit which provides scholarships for French language students.

Arceneaux has served as a member of the board of directors of the Europe/Louisiana Business Council, a member of the French/American Chamber of Commerce, Louisiana Chapter, and a member of the World Trade Center of New Orleans.

President Bill Clinton appointed Arceneaux to be chair of the board of directors of SallieMae Corporation (1993-1997).

Arceneaux served on the board of Louisiana Public Broadcasting (LPB), the state wide affiliate of the Public Broadcasting Service (PBS), from 1989 to 2007.

As host of a weekly television show of classic French films called Cinéma Français which aired on LPB from 2009 to 2012, Arceneaux introduced the films in French. English subtitles were provided along with study guides and discussions.

He is director and member of the board of trustees of the Foundation for Excellence in Louisiana Public Broadcasting (FELPB).

He was a distinguished visiting lecturer in history at Tulane University in New Orleans (2007 to 2012), teaches as an adjunct professor of history at Louisiana State University in Baton Rouge, and is president of the Council for the Development of French in Louisiana (CODOFIL) (2011- ).

== Honors ==
He received the L'Ordre des Francophones d’Amerique from the Quebec government in 2016.

== Author ==
Arceneaux is the author of two books:

- Acadian General: Alfred Mouton and the Civil War. University of Southwestern Louisiana. 1981. ISBN 978-0940984004.
- No Spark of Malice: The Murder of Martin Begnaud. L.S.U. Press. 2000. ISBN 978-0807124475. Published in French as Meurtre en Louisane: L'Affaire des Freres Blanc, Editions Atlantique, 2007.

== Personal life ==
Born in Scott, Louisiana on August 19, 1941. Graduated from the University of Louisiana at Lafayette with a B.A. in history in 1962. Received his M.A. in 1965 from Louisiana State University in Baton Rouge. Ph.D. in History and Politics in 1969.

Arceneaux spent most of 1967 in Venezuela and its politics became the central subject of his dissertation. This led to the founding of the Consortium for Service in Latin America (CSLA) in the 1980s which aimed to promote democracy training.

Married to Patricia Arceneaux, Bill lives in Baton Rouge, Louisiana. He has four children and five grandchildren.

== Archives ==
The William Arceneaux Papers at the Hill Memorial Library at Louisiana State University cover his career.
