= Sidonie de la Houssaye =

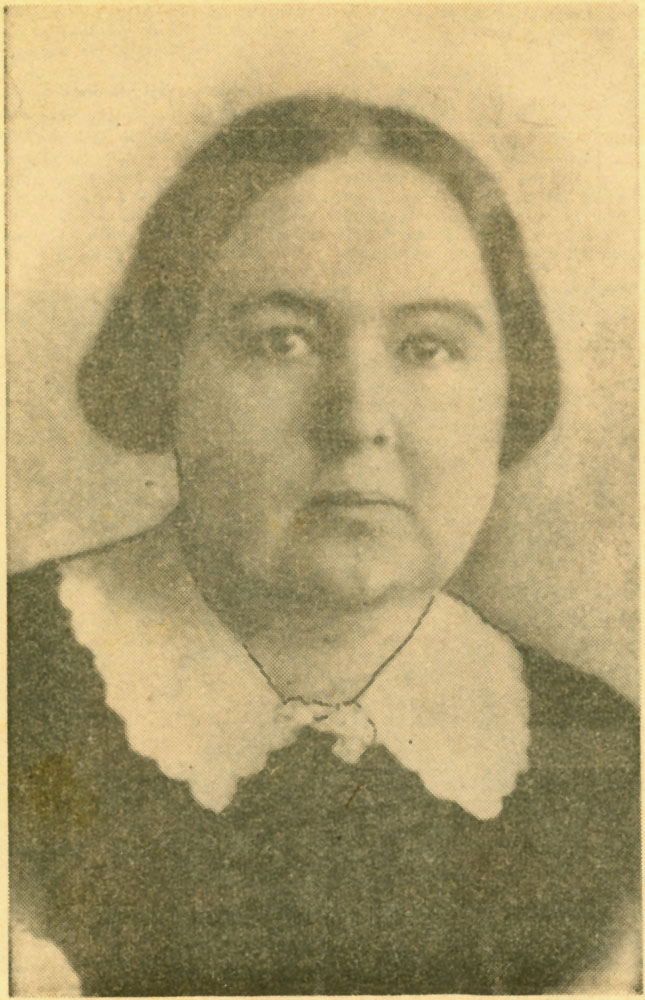
Sidonie de la Houssaye

Sidonie de la Houssaye, born Hélène Perret, pen name Louise Raymond (Edgard, Louisiana, August 17, 1820 – February 18, 1894) was an American-born French language writer of Louisiana Creole descent.

The daughter of Creoles Ursin Perret and Françoise Pain, she received a bilingual education in English and French while living in St. John the Baptist Parish, Louisiana. She married Alexandre Pelletier de la Houssaye when she was thirteen years old, and they had eight sons and one daughter together.

After her husband's death during the American Civil War, she worked as a school teacher in Franklin, Louisiana for an all girls' school that she had created. In the 1870s, she began writing a series of stories for children that express the social conflicts of Civil War-era Louisiana, touching on themes including the history of slavery, animosity between Anglophone versus Francophone Louisianans, and Indigenous people in Louisiana. In the 1880s, she wrote and published the novel Pouponne et Balthazar (1888) about a young Acadian couple who fled from Canada to Louisiana when the British evicted them. She is best known for her 1895 book Les Quarteronnes de la Nouvelle Orléans (The Quadroons of New Orleans).

Sidonie de La Houssaye was the only widely published woman among nineteenth-century Louisiana authors who wrote in French.

== Works ==
- Contes d'une grand-mère louisianaise
  - "Les Petits Soldats"
  - "Les Petits Soldats" manuscript
- Pouponne et Balthazar, 1888
- Amis et Fortune
- Les Quarteronnes de La Nouvelle Orléans (posthumous tetralogy published from 1895 in Le Méchacébé)

Gina la quarteronne
Dahlia la quarteronne
Octavia la quarteronne
Violetta la quarteronne

== Recent editions ==
Louisiana-based publisher Les Éditions Tintamarre has published several works by de la Houssaye in recent years, continuing the press's commitment to preserving Louisiana's Francophone literary heritage.

- Contes d’une grand-mère louisianaise, introduction and notes by Jonathan Vidrine, Les Éditions Tintamarre, 2007 (ISBN 0-9754244-1-6)
- Les Quarteronnes de la Nouvelle-Orléans, tome I, Octavia & Violetta, introduction and notes by Christian Hommel, Les Éditions Tintamarre, 2006 (ISBN 0-9754244-2-4)
- Les Quarteronnes de la Nouvelle-Orléans, tome II, Gina la quarteronne, introduction and notes by Christian Hommel, Les Éditions Tintamarre, 2008 (ISBN 978-0-9793230-5-8)
