= KBON =

- Mamou, Louisiana; United States
- Broadcast area: Lafayette, Louisiana, and Acadiana
- Frequency: 101.1 MHz
- Branding: KBON 101.1 FM

Programming
- Format: Louisiana Flavor

Ownership
- Owner: Rose Ann Marx

History
- First air date: 1997/05/29
- Former call signs: KAHK (CP, 1994-1997)
- Call sign meaning: "Bon temps"

Technical information
- Licensing authority: FCC
- Facility ID: 60867
- Class: C3
- ERP: 25,000 watts
- HAAT: 100 meters (330 ft)
- Transmitter coordinates: 30°29′50.00″N 92°15′59.00″W

Links
- Public license information: Public file; LMS
- Website: kbon.com

KBON (101.1 FM) is a radio station that promotes the local music, heritage, and culture of South Louisiana. Featuring Cajun French, swamp pop, and zydeco alongside country, classic country, blues, Southern rock, soul, R&B, and oldies. KBON 101.1 is a “Variety Music station with a Louisiana Flavor.” Louisiana music makes up 80% of its music programming, giving homegrown artists a place on the air and helping carry the region’s musical traditions from one generation to the next.

== History ==
KBON went on the air May 29th, 1997, the brainchild of Paul Marx, a DJ and nightclub owner from Crowley, Louisiana. Marx wanted a mix of music that resembled what he played at DJ gigs — a core of Louisiana music like Cajun, zydeco, and swamp pop, with sides of country, blues, soul, and R&B. Station DJs also broadcast in a mix of English and Cajun French.

Online streaming introduced KBON to a worldwide audience. In 2003, a reporter for The Washington Post wrote about a pilgrimage he made to its Eunice studios:

Wow. This was no test-marketed format. This was no committee-scripted patter beamed by satellite from corporate HQ and squeezed between certified safe hits. This was...radio. From a real place. With real people doing the talking, who clearly knew the people doing the listening.

KBON was originally assigned the calls KAHK-FM as a construction permit in 1994, but changed to KBON shortly before signing on. Paul Marx died in 2019 at age 71.

== History of call letters ==
The call letters KBON previously were assigned to an AM station in Omaha, Nebraska. It began broadcasting March 1, 1941, on 1400 kHz with 250 W power (full-time).
