= Louisiana French =

French variety spoken in Louisiana, United States

- français louisianais
- The flag of French Louisiana
- Native to: United States
- Region: French Louisiana (New Orleans, Cajun Country), southeastern Texas
- Ethnicity: Louisiana French (Cajun, Creole)
- Native speakers: 77,000 (1.6% of the population). (2022)
- Language family: Indo-European: Italic; Latino-Faliscan; Latinic; Romance; Italo-Western; Western; Gallo-Iberian; Gallo-Romance; Gallo-Rhaetian?; Arpitan–Oïl; Oïl; Francien zone; French; Louisiana French
- Early forms: Old Latin: Vulgar Latin; Proto-Romance; Old Gallo-Romance; Old French; Middle French

Official status
- Official language in: Louisiana

Language codes
- ISO 639-3: frc
- Glottolog: caju1236 Cajun French
- ELP: Cajun French
- Linguasphere: 51-AAA-iie
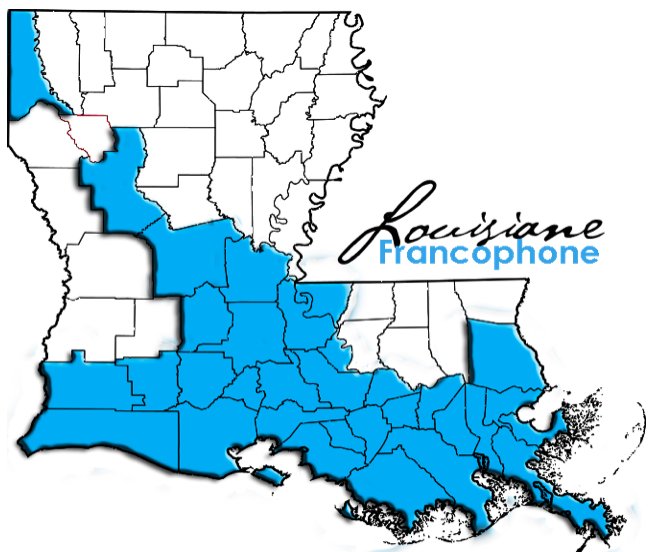
- Blue indicates Louisiana parishes where French was commonly spoken in 2011.

- Louisiana French is classified as Severely Endangered by the UNESCO Atlas of the World's Languages in Danger

A man speaking Louisiana French

Louisiana French (Louisiana French: français louisianais; Louisiana Creole: françé Lalwizyàn) is the variety of the French language spoken traditionally by French Louisianians in former colonial Lower Louisiana. In the 21st-century, dialects of Louisiana French are primarily used in the state of Louisiana, specifically in its southern parishes.

Over the centuries, the language has incorporated some words of African, Spanish, Native American and English origin, sometimes giving it linguistic features found only in Louisiana. Louisiana French differs to varying extents from French dialects spoken in other regions, but Louisiana French is mutually intelligible with other dialects and is most closely related to those of Missouri, New England, Canada and northwestern France.

It is a misconception that no one in Louisiana spoke or wrote Standard French. The resemblance that Louisiana French bears to Standard French varies depending on the dialect and register, with formal and urban variants in Louisiana more closely resembling Standard French. Historically, most works of media and literature produced in Louisiana—such as Les Cenelles, a poetry anthology compiled by a group of gens de couleur libres, and Creole-authored novels such as L'Habitation St-Ybars or Pouponne et Balthazar—were written in standard French.

The United States Census' 2017–2021 American Community Survey estimated that 1.64% of Louisianans over the age of 5 spoke French or a French-based creole at home. As of 2023, The Advocate roughly estimated that there were 120,000 French speakers in Louisiana, including about 20,000 Cajun French, but noted that their ability to provide an accurate assessment was very limited. These numbers were down from roughly a million speakers in the 1960s. Distribution of these speakers is uneven, however, with the majority residing in the south-central region known as Acadiana. Some of the Acadiana parishes register francophone populations of 10% or more of the total, with a select few (such as Vermilion, Evangeline and St. Martin Parishes) exceeding 15%.

French is spoken across ethnic and racial lines by people who may identify as Cajuns and Creoles as well as Chitimacha, Houma, Biloxi, Tunica, Choctaw, Acadians, and French Indians among others. For these reasons, as well as the relatively small influence Acadian French has had on the region, the label Louisiana French or Louisiana Regional French (French: français régional louisianais) is generally regarded as more accurate and inclusive than "Cajun French" (French: français cadien) and is the preferred term by linguists and anthropologists. However, the term "Cajun French" is commonly used in lay discourse by speakers of the language and other inhabitants of Louisiana.

Louisiana French should further not be confused with Louisiana Creole, a distinct French-based creole language indigenous to Louisiana and spoken across racial lines. In Louisiana, language labels are often conflated with ethnic labels, and Cajun-identified speakers might therefore call their language "Cajun French" even when linguists would identify it as Louisiana Creole. Likewise, many Creoles of various backgrounds (including Cajuns) do not speak Louisiana Creole but rather Louisiana French.

Parishes in which the dialect is still found include Acadia, Allen, Ascension, Assumption, Avoyelles, Cameron, Evangeline, Iberia, Jefferson Davis, Lafayette, Lafourche, St. Landry, St. Martin, St. Mary, Terrebonne, Pointe Coupée, Vermilion, and other parishes of southern Louisiana.

== History ==
=== Colonial Louisiana ===
Starting in the second half of the 17th century, several trading posts were established in Lower Louisiana (French: Basse-Louisiane) eventually giving way to greater French colonial aspirations with the turn of the century. French immigration was at its peak during the 17th and 18th centuries, which firmly established the Creole culture and language there. One important distinction to make is that the term "créole" at the time was consistently used to signify native, or "locally-born" in contrast to "foreign-born". In general the core of the population was rather diverse, coming from all over the French colonial empire, including Canada, France, and the French West Indies.

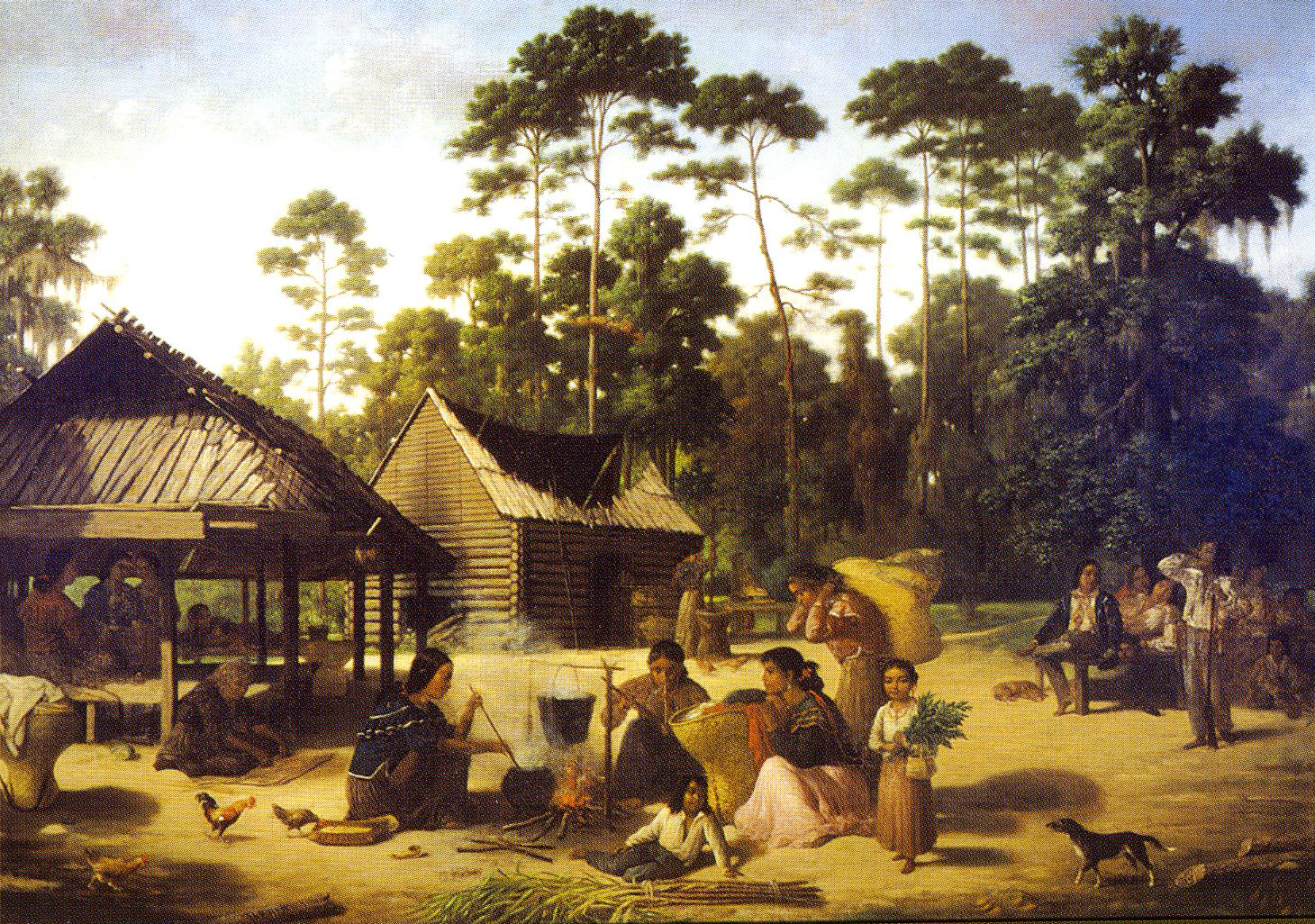
Choctaw Village near the Chefuncte, by Francois Bernard, 1869, Peabody Museum – Harvard University. The Choctaw people had a great impact on the development of Louisiana French.

Eventually, with the consistent relations built between the Native American tribes and francophones, new vocabulary was adopted into the colonial language. For example, something of a "French-Choctaw patois" is said to have developed primarily among Louisiana's Afro-French population and métis Creoles with a large portion of its vocabulary said to be of Native American origin.

Prior to the late arrival of the Acadian people in Louisiana, the French of Louisiana had already begun to undergo changes as noted by Captain Jean-Bernard Bossu who traveled with and witnessed Jean-Baptiste Le Moyne speaking this "common language." This unusual blend of French was also noticed by Pierre-Clement de Laussat during a lunch visit with the Creole-French Canterelle family. Upon the arrival of their Houma relatives, the family began conversing in "French and Choctaw." Additional witness to this variety of French comes from J.F.H. Claiborne, a cousin of Louisiana's first American governor, who also noted the "unusual patois of provincial French and Choctaw."

Starting in 1755, large populations of the French-speaking Acadians began to arrive en masse along the Mississippi River as well as eventually arriving all the way to south to the modern-day state of Louisiana following the Great Upheaval. In 1762, France relinquished all its territorial claims in North America, and the province of Louisiana was transferred to Spain. The Spanish government of what was then Luisiana permitted the Acadians to continue to speak French and maintain their own customs. The original Acadian community was composed mainly of farmers and fishermen.

However, the hardships after being exiled from Nova Scotia, along with the difficult process of resettlement in Louisiana and the ensuing poverty made it difficult to establish schools in the early stages of the community's development. Eventually private academies appeared, whose faculty had recently arrived in Louisiana from or had been educated in France. Children were usually able to attend the schools only long enough to learn counting and reading. At the time, a standard part of a child's education in the Cajun community was also the Catholic catechism, which was taught in French by an older member of the community. The educational system did not allow for much contact with Standard French. It has often been held that Acadian French has had a large impact on the development of Louisiana French, but this has been disputed.

=== 19th century ===
French immigration continued in the 19th century until the start of the American Civil War, bringing large numbers of francophones speaking something more similar to today's Metropolitan French. Over time, through contact between different ethnic groups, the various dialects converged to produce what is known as Louisiana French. The 1845 Louisiana constitution permitted any legislator to address the body in either English or French, and the 1845 and 1852 constitutions required all laws to be written in both English and French.

The 1864 Louisiana constitution abandoned the dual language requirement and directed public instruction to be conducted in English, although Article 128 protected the right of French speakers to hold public office. The post-Civil War constitution of 1868 further stated that "no laws shall require judicial process to be issued in any [language] other than the English language". However, French was still the most spoken language in many parishes of Louisiana, and the constitution of 1879 adjusted the previous restrictions to require that laws "be promulgated and preserved in the English language; but the General Assembly may provide for the publication of the laws in the French Language, and prescribe that judicial advertisements in certain designated cities and parishes...be made in that language." It also allowed primary school to teach in French, a provision that was extended in the 1898 and 1913 constitutions to include secondary schools.

=== Decline in the early 20th century ===
The 1921 Louisiana constitution reversed the previous language rights and banned the teaching of French in all public schools. At that time, the constitution established English as the official language of Louisiana, which pushed French out of New Orleans to its current location in southwestern parts of the state. The education and religious services of Louisiana eventually gravitated to English, with the eventual consequence that speaking French became a sign of cultural illegitimacy. Some parents viewed the practice of teaching their children English as the intrusion of a foreign culture, and many refused to send their children to school. When attendance was made compulsory, they opted for private French Catholic schools which taught in French. Derogatory terms and phrases were used by English speakers to put social pressure on French speakers ("Don't speak Cajun. Speak White!"), a sentiment later criticized by the Québécois poet Michèle Lalonde's in her 1974 poem "Speak White" ("Speak white... be civilized"). The French schools worked to emphasize Standard French, which they considered to be the prestige dialect. When the government required all schools, public and parochial, to teach in English, new teachers, who could not speak French, were hired. Children could not understand their teachers and generally ignored them by continuing to speak French. Eventually, children were subjected to corporal punishment for speaking French on school grounds.

The punishment system (which was not dissimilar to the manner in which children attempting to speak both immigrant and indigenous languages other than English were dealt with in schools elsewhere in North America) seems to have been responsible for much of the decay that Louisiana French experienced in the 20th century since, in turn, people who could not speak English were perceived as uneducated. Therefore, parents became hesitant to teach French to their children, hoping that the children would have a better life in an English-speaking nation. As of 2011, there were an estimated 150,000 to 200,000 people in Louisiana who spoke French. By comparison, there were an estimated one million native French-speakers in Louisiana in about 1968. While French is now taught in schools, the local dialect is now at risk of extinction as children are no longer taught it.

As of 2007, there were questions whether the Louisiana French language would survive into another generation. The current 1974 Louisiana constitution does not specify an official language, and some residents of Acadiana are bilingual though, having learned French at home and English in school. Currently, Louisiana French is considered an endangered language.

=== Decline in World War II ===
The war compelled many Cajun people to leave their home state of Louisiana for the first time and serve in the military. Cajun GIs, most of whom could neither speak nor understand English, encountered solely English-speaking Americans and learned that language to serve and survive in the military.

Back on the home front, many Cajun civilians united with other Anglo-Americans to support the war effort by volunteering as air raid wardens, plane spotters, firefighters, auxiliary policemen, nursing aides, as well as participating in bond, stamp, and scrap drives. These activities which the Cajuns participated in promoted feelings of national unity, and drew the Cajuns closer to Mainstream America. During this time period, emphasis on the 'American way of life' had a massive impact on Cajun children: census data shows that the use of Cajun French as a first language dropped 17 percent for Cajuns born during US involvement in WW2, the single largest decrease since the beginning of the 20th century, and also resulted in the practice of punishing Cajun students for speaking French at school.

=== Preservation efforts ===
Marilyn J. Conwell of Pennsylvania State University conducted a study of Louisiana French in 1959 and published in 1963 the book Louisiana French Grammar, which has been regarded as probably the first complete study of a Louisiana French dialect. Conwell focused on the French spoken in Lafayette, Louisiana, and evaluated what was then its current status. She pointed out that the gradual decline of French made it relatively common to find grand-parents who speak only French, parents who speak both French and English, children who speak English and understand French, and grand-children who speak and understand only English. The decision to teach French to children was well-received since grandparents hoped for better opportunities for communicating with their grandchildren.

All varieties of French in Louisiana according to the 2015 American Community Survey, including Louisiana French. Parishes marked in yellow are those where 4–10%, orange 10–15%, and red 15–20% of the population speak French at home.

The Council for the Development of French in Louisiana (CODOFIL) was established in 1968 to promote the preservation of French language and culture in Louisiana. The Louisiana state legislature has greatly shifted its stance on the status of French. Since the passage of Legislative Act No. 409 in 1968, the Louisiana governor is granted the authorization "to establish the Council for the Development of Louisiana-French" and that the agency is to consist of no more than fifty members, including a chairman. The name was soon changed to CODOFIL and was granted the power to "do anything possible and necessary to encourage the development, usage and preservation of French as it exists in Louisiana".

In 1984, Jules O. Daigle, a Roman Catholic priest, published the first dictionary devoted to "Cajun French", A Dictionary of the Cajun Language. Once considered an authority on the language, it is however not exhaustive; it omits alternate spellings and synonyms that Father Daigle deemed "perversions" of the language but are nonetheless popular among so-called Louisiana French speakers and writers. Though remaining useful today, Daigle's dictionary has been superseded by the Dictionary of Louisiana French (2010), edited by Albert Valdman and other authorities on the language.

Also in 1984, the French educational and cultural center Alliance Française of New Orleans was founded. It moved in 1987 in its current premises on Jackson Avenue in New Orleans.

Beginning in the 1990s, various signage, packaging, and documentation in French became present throughout the state. State and local tourism bureau commissions were influential in convincing city, parish and state officials to produce bilingual signage and documentation. French and English bilingual signage is usually confined to the old districts of cities, like the French Quarter in New Orleans, downtown Lafayette and New Iberia (trilingual with Spanish), St. Martinville, Breaux Bridge, as well as several other cities. Locals continue to refer to the place names in English and for postal services, English is generally preferred. To meet the demands of a growing francophone tourist market, tourism bureaus and commissions throughout the state, particularly in southern Louisiana, have information on tourist sites in both French and English as well as in other major languages spoken by tourists.

==== Image gallery ====
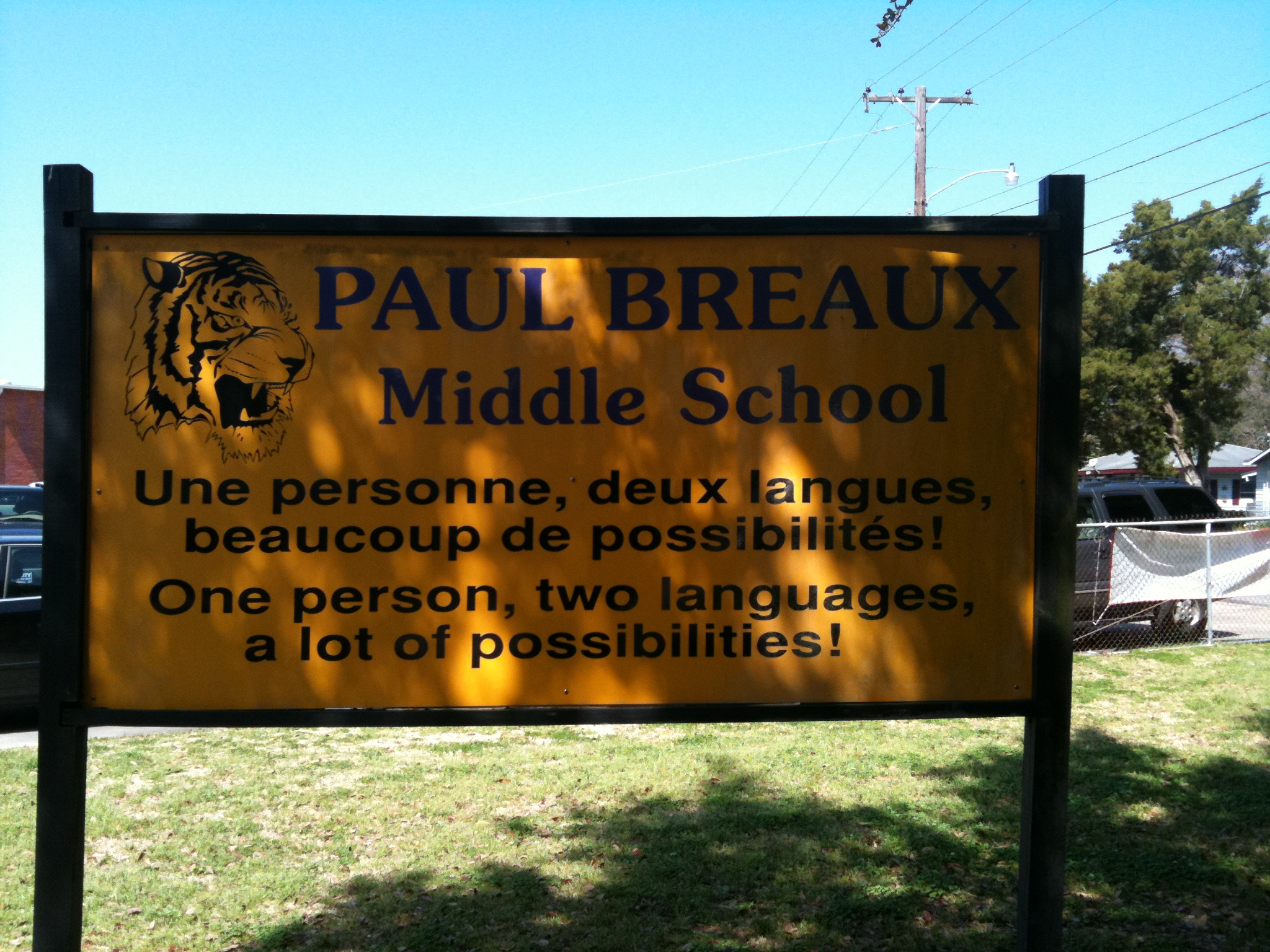
French and English slogan of bilingual Paul Breaux Middle School in Lafayette, Louisiana

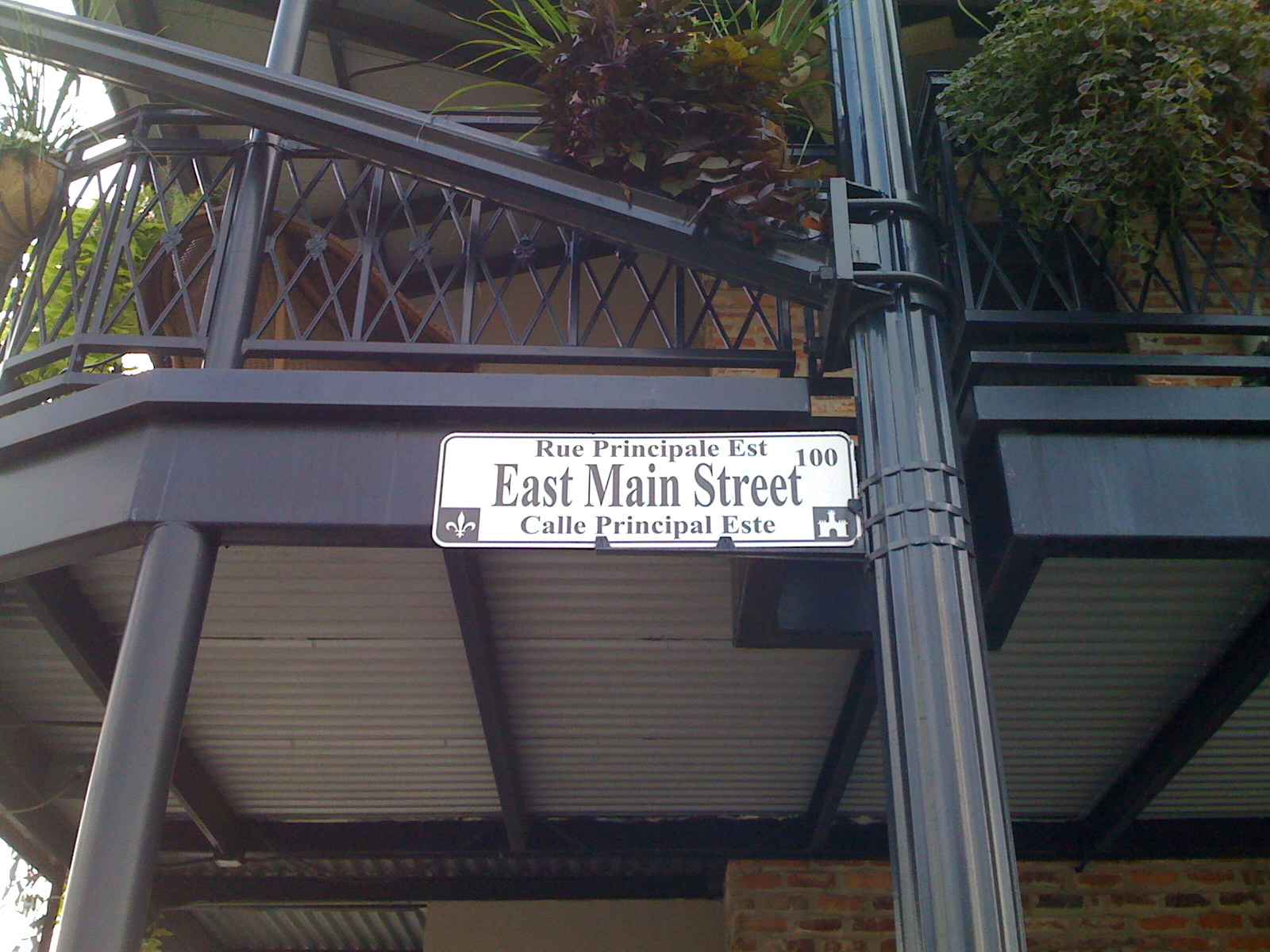
New Iberia, Louisiana street sign in English, French, and Spanish

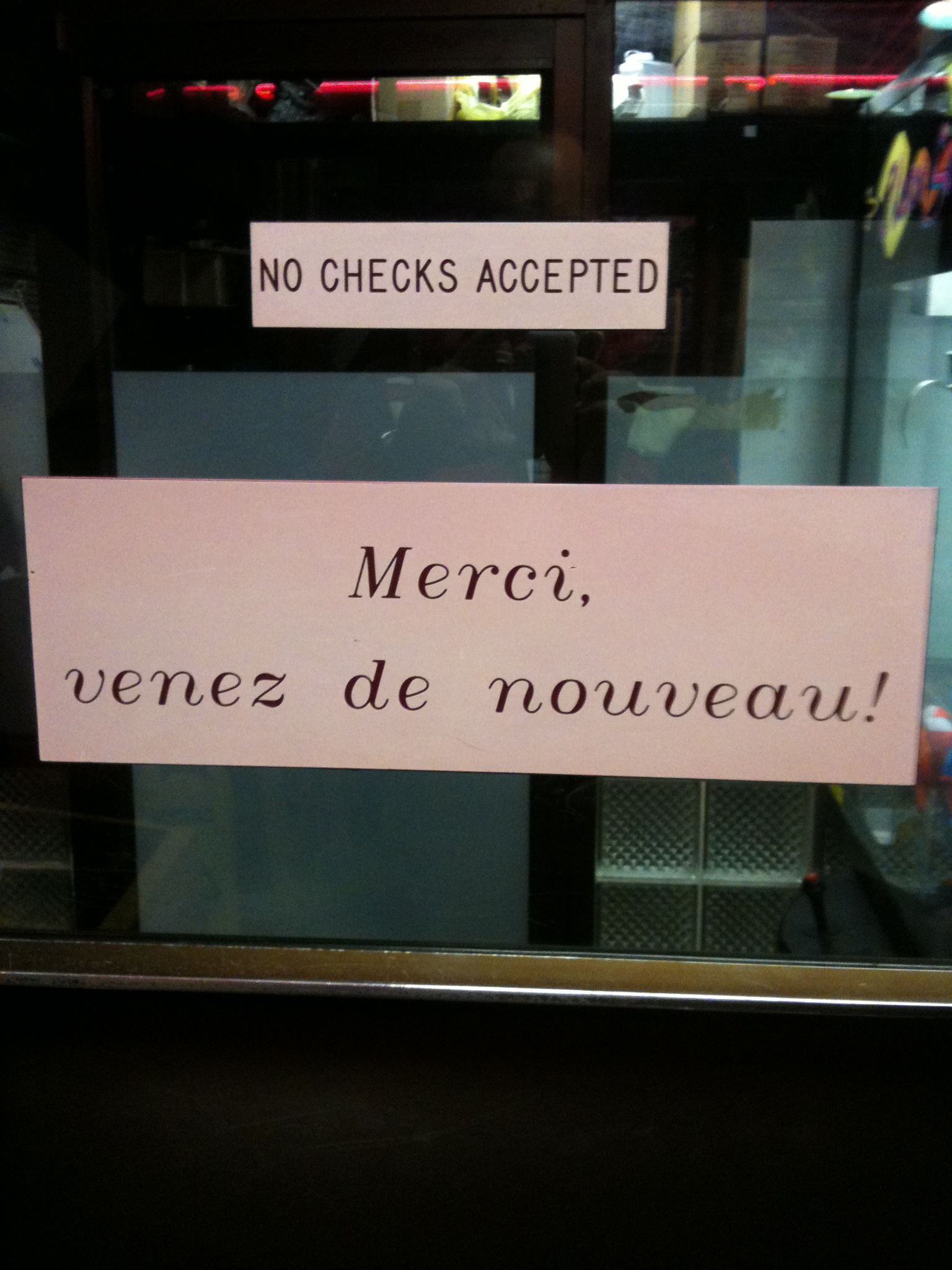
Notices to customers of Mel's Diner, Lafayette, Louisiana

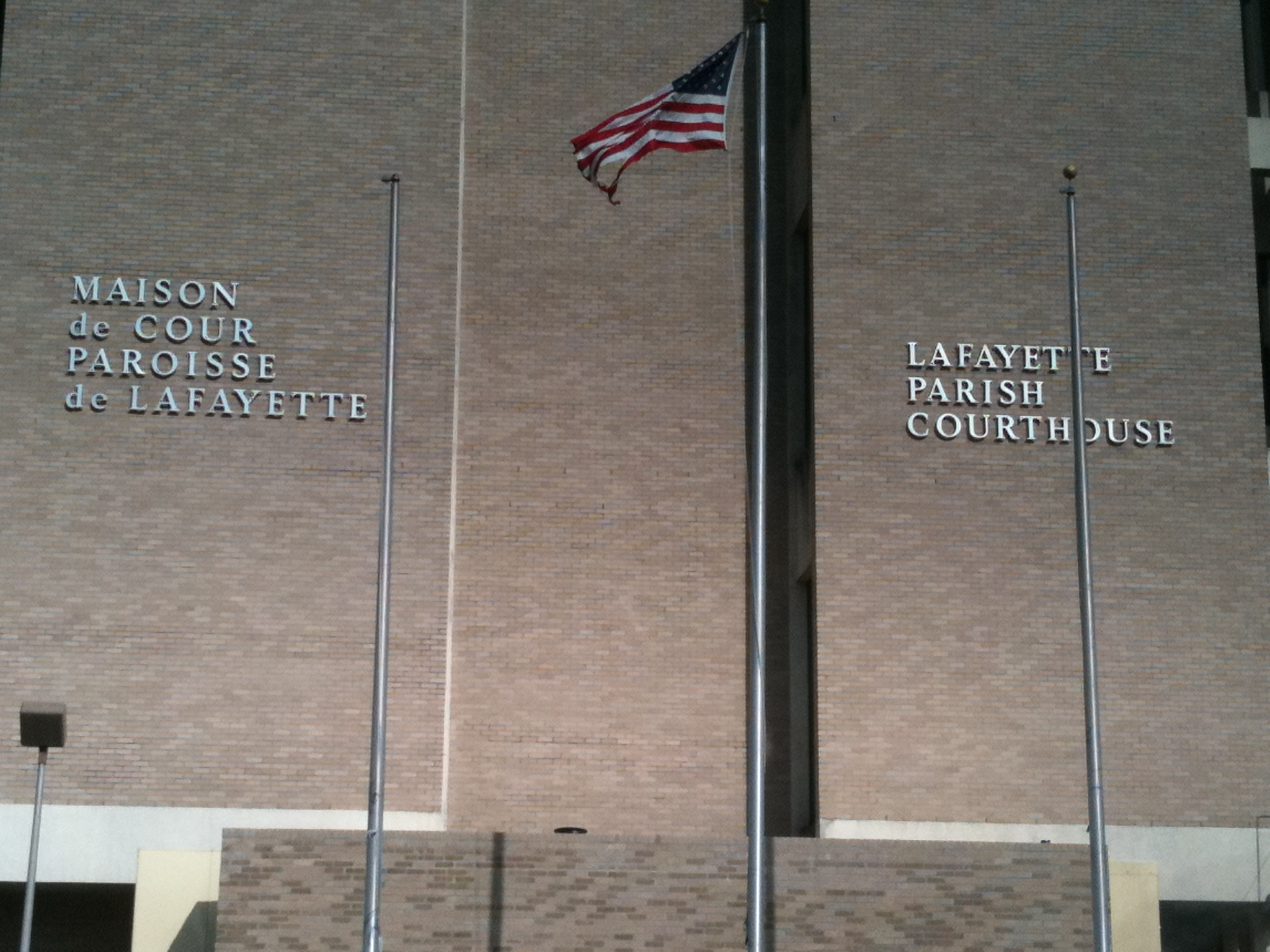
The courthouse/maison de cour in Lafayette, Louisiana

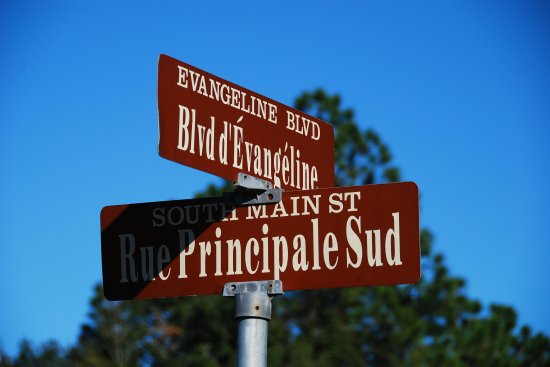
Bilingual street signs in St. Martinville, Louisiana

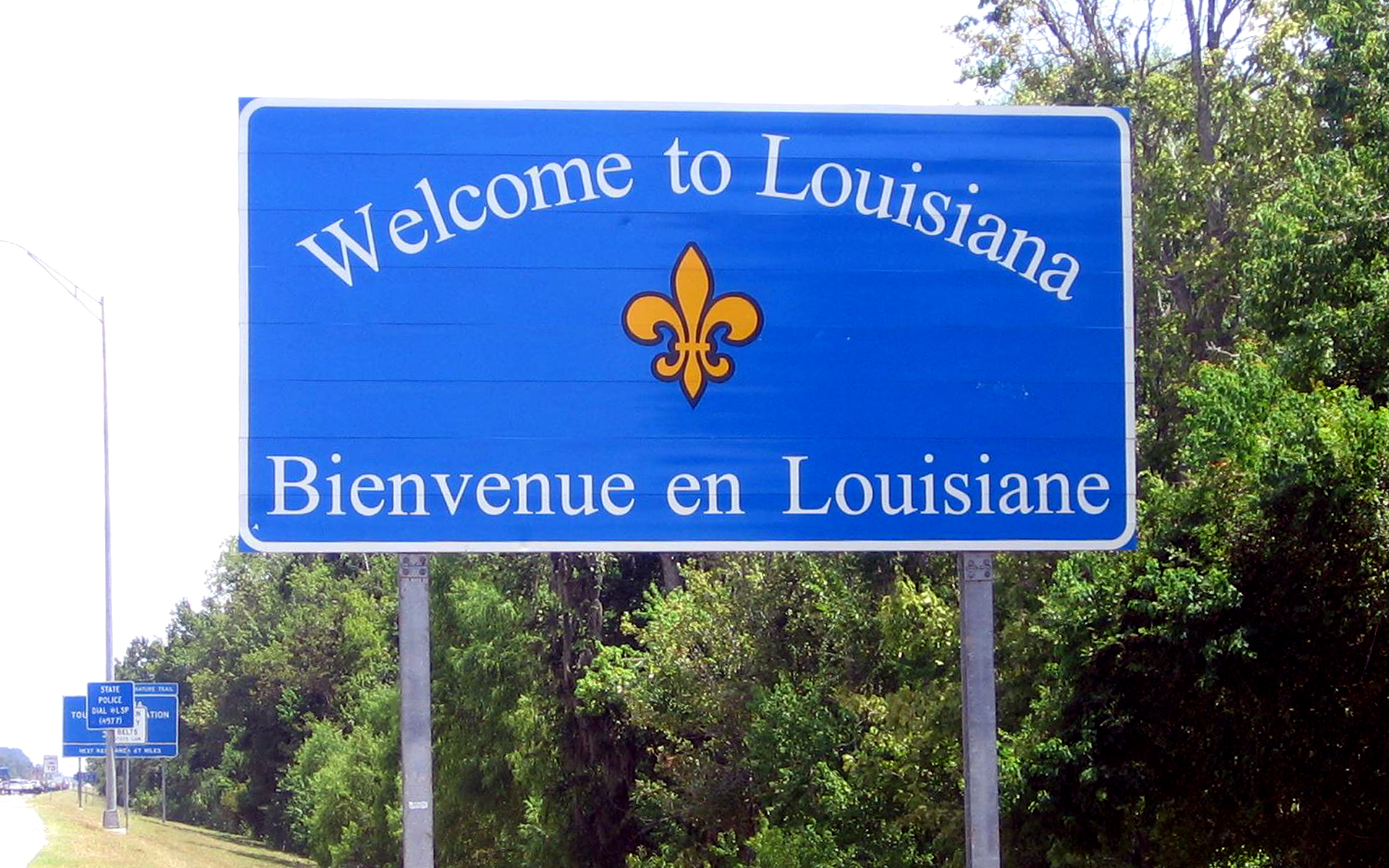
A welcome sign at the Louisiana state border

=== Recent developments ===
Many young adults are learning enough French to understand French music lyrics. Also, there is now a trend to use French-language websites to learn the dialect. Culinary words and terms of endearment such as "cher" [ʃæ] (dear) and "nonc" (uncle) are still heard among otherwise English-speaking Louisianians.

Interview with Louis Michot, a Lafayette musician discussing changing attitudes toward the language and culture, 2013

An article written online by the Université Laval argues that the state of Louisiana's shift, from an anti-French stance to one of soft promotion has been of great importance to the survival of the language. The article states that it is advantageous to invigorate the revival of the language, to better cherish the state's rich heritage, and to protect a francophone minority that has suffered greatly from negligence by political and religious leaders. Furthermore, the university's article claims that it is CODOFIL rather than the state itself which sets language policy; the only political stance the state of Louisiana makes is that of noninterference. All of this culminates in the fact that outside the extremely southern portions of the state, French remains a secondary language that retains heavy cultural and identity values.

According to Jacques Henry, former executive director of CODOFIL, much progress has been made for francophones and the future of French in Louisiana is not merely a symbolic one. According to statistics gathered by CODOFIL, the past twenty years has seen widespread acceptance of French-immersion programs. He goes further to write that the official recognition, appreciation by parents, and inclusion of French in schools reflects growing regard of the language. Ultimately the survival of French in Louisiana can only be guaranteed by Louisianan parents and politicians, but that there is still hope. Similarly, the state legislature passed the Louisiana French Language Services Act in 2011 with particular mention to cultural tourism, local culture, and heritage. The bill sets forth that each branch of the state government shall take necessary action to identify employees who are proficient in French. Each branch of the state government is to take necessary steps in producing services in the French language for both locals and visitors. This bill is, however, an unfunded state mandate. The legislative act was drafted and presented by francophone and francophile senators and representatives as it asserts that the French language is vital to the economy of the state.

In October 2018, through an initiative launched by Scott Tilton and Rudy Bazenet, Louisiana became the first U.S. state to join the Organisation Internationale de la Francophonie. Since Louisiana joined the Francophonie, new organizations have launched to help revitalize Louisiana French, including the Nous Foundation and Alliance Française of New Orleans.

Grassroots initiatives remain popular among francophone subsections of Louisianian society, often organized through online platforms such as Facebook. French-language initiatives founded in the late 2010s and early 2020s include Télé-Louisiane, a multimedia platform; Charrer-Veiller, a podcast (defunct as of 2022); LaCréole, another podcast; and Le Bourdon de la Louisiane, a web gazette. Poetry remains the most popular medium of literary expression, with poets such as Kirby Jambon and Ashlee Michot receiving international attention.

As with other cases of language revitalization (such as Irish), young Louisianians may speak a more standardized French than their forebears, having learned French both at school and via the greater community. Among such youths, the influence of vernacular Louisiana French on their speech patterns varies from speaker to speaker, depending on such factors as ethnic background, socioeconomic class, exposure to francophones of the elder generation, educational level, political beliefs and personal preference.

Given increased levels of education in Standard French and greater exposure to the international francophonie, it is likely Louisiana French will continue to evolve in this manner, with some traditionally Louisianian words and linguistic features being retained while others slowly fade.

== Population ==
Reliable counts of speakers of Louisiana French are difficult to obtain as distinct from other varieties of French. However, the vast majority of native residents of Louisiana and east and southeast Texas who speak French are likely speakers of Louisiana French.

In Louisiana, as of 2010, the population of French speakers was approximately 115,183. These populations were concentrated most heavily in the southern, coastal parishes.

In Texas, as of 2010, the French-speaking population was 55,773, though many of these were likely to be immigrants from France or other French-speaking countries who moved to cities and suburbs all over the state. Nevertheless, in the rural eastern-southeastern Texas counties of Orange, Jefferson, Chambers, Newton, Jasper, Tyler, Liberty, and Hardin alone—areas where it can be reasonably presumed that almost all French speakers are Louisiana French speakers—the total French-speaking population was composed of 3,400 individuals. It is likely a substantial portion of the 14,493 speakers in Houston's Harris County are also Louisiana French speakers. With this in mind, a marked decline in the number of French speakers in Texas has been noticed in the last half of the twentieth century. For example, at one point the French-speaking population of Jefferson County was 24,049 as compared to the mere 1,922 today. Likewise, in Harris County the French-speaking population has shifted from 26,796 to 14,493 individuals.

Louisiana French-speaking populations can also be found in southern Mississippi and Alabama, as well as pockets in other parts of the United States.

== Grammar ==
Despite ample time for Louisiana French to diverge, the basic grammatical core of the language remains similar or the same as Standard French. Even so, it can be expected that the language would begin to diverge due to the various influences of neighboring languages, changing francophone demographics, and unstable opportunities for education. Furthermore, Louisiana French lacks any official regulating body unlike the Académie française or Office québécois de la langue française to take part in standardizing the language.

=== Pronouns ===
Person	Subject Pronoun	Direct Object	Indirect Object	Reflexive	Disjunctive Pronoun
1st singular	je / j'	me / m'	me / m'	me / m'	moi
2nd singular informal	tu / t'	te / t'	te / t'	te / t'	toi
2nd singular formal^{1}	vous	vous	vous	vous	vous
3rd singular	il (i'); elle (e') / alle (a'); ça	le (l'); la (l') / lé (l')	lui / y	se / s'	lui; elle; ça
1st plural	on; nous^{2}	nous	nous	se / s'	nous-autres (même)
2nd plural	vous-autres	vous	vous	vous / vous-autres / se / s'	vous-autres (même)
3rd plural	ils; eux-autres; ça; eusse^{3}	les	leur / y'eux / eux	se / s'	eux-autres; ça; eusse^{3}

1. the formal second-person singular form is rarely used
2. nous is only present in formal language
3. eusse/euse is confined to the southeastern parishes of Louisiana

Immediately some distinct characteristics of Louisiana French can be gleaned from its personal pronouns. For example, the traditional third-person singular feminine pronoun elle of Standard French is present but also there is the alternative of alle which is chosen by some authors since it more closely approximates speakers' pronunciation. Also, use of the pronoun ils has supplanted the third-person feminine pronoun elles as it is used to refer to both masculine and feminine subjects. Similarly, all of the other third-person plural pronouns are neutral. The usage of -autres with plural pronouns is widespread in the language.

=== Verbs ===
In order to demonstrate the use of some of the indicative verb tenses in Louisiana French, take the example of manger, meaning "to eat":

Person	Present	Present Progressive	Passé Composé	Imperfect	Conditional	Near Future	Future
1st singular	je mange j'mange	je / j'suis après manger je / j'suis apé manger	j'ai mangé	je mangeais j'mangeais	je mangerais j'mangerais	je vas manger j'vas manger	je mangeras j'mangeras
2nd singular informal	tu manges	t'es après manger t'es apé manger	t'as mangé	tu mangeais	tu mangerais	tu vas manger	tu mangeras
2nd singular formal	vous mangez	vous êtes après manger vous êtes apé manger	vous avez mangé	vous mangeâtes	vous mangeriez	vous allez manger	vous mangerez
3rd singular	il mange	il est après manger il est apé manger	il a mangé	il mangeait	il mangerait	il va manger	il mangera
1st plural	on mange	on est après manger on est apé manger	on a mangé	on mangeait	on mangerait	on va manger	on mangera
2nd plural	vous-autres mange	vous-autres est après manger vous-autres est apé manger	vous-autres a mangé	vous-autres mangeait	vous-autres mangerait	vous-autres va manger	vous-autres mangera
3rd plural	ils mangent ils mangeont	ils sont après manger ils sont apé manger	ils ont mangé	ils mangeaient ils mangiont	ils mangeraient ils mangeriont	ils vont manger	ils mangeront

Some minor simplification of tenses is exhibited in the conjugation of the verb manger, namely of the plural first and second person conjugations which are inflected identically to the third person singular. Not only this, but the inflection of the third person plural verb form has diverged between the form identical to Standard French and the use of -ont in for all verbs.

The elision that is common in many aspects of French is accelerated in Louisiana French with the schwa in je often omitted regardless of the presence of a following vowel as well as the regular use of t'es (tu es) and t'as (tu as) as opposed to such avoidance in Standard French.

The present progressive tense of Louisiana French initially appears alien as compared to Standard French but après/apé possesses the same function signified by en train de.

=== Contractions ===
Unlike Standard French, vernacular Louisiana French may avoid article-preposition contractions involving the prepositions de or des:

- "I learned from the grandparents."
  - Louisiana French: "J'ai appris de les grand-parents."
  - Standard French: "J'ai appris des grand-parents."
- "the skylight"
  - Louisiana French: "la lumière de le ciel"
  - Standard French: "la lumière du ciel"

Such contraction avoidance is a purely oral phenomenon, and written registers in Louisiana do not highly differ from Standard French. In novels, newspapers, government documents, plays, letters, etc., written from the colonial era to the early twentieth century, it would be unusual to see de le used in place of du, or de les in place of des.

=== Proper names ===
Place names in Louisiana French may differ from those in Standard French. For instance, locales named for American Indian tribes usually use the plural article les instead of the masculine or feminine singular articles le or la. Likewise, the contraction aux (à and les) is used with such locations. This trend seems to vary by region since in Pierre Part and Lafayette elderly francophones have often been heard to say la Californie, le Texas, la Floride. In informal Louisiana French, most US states and countries are pronounced as in English and therefore require no article but in formal Louisiana French, prefixed articles are absent: Californie, Texas, Floride, Belgique, Liban, etc.

English	Louisiana French		Standard French
English	Informal	Formal	Standard French
Carencro	(le/au bayou) Carencro; St-Pierre	Carencro; St-Pierre	Carencro
New Iberia	Ibérie	la Nouvelle-Ibérie	la Nouvelle-Ibérie
Natchitoches	(les/aux) Natchitoches	(les/aux) Natchitoches	Natchitoches
New Orleans	en ville	la Nouvelle-Orléans	la Nouvelle-Orléans
Arkansas	(les/aux) Arcs	(les/aux) Arcs	l'Arkansas
Illinois	(les/aux) Illinois	(les/aux) Illinois	l'Illinois
Lake Charles	(le/au) Lac-Charles	(le/au) Lac-Charles	Lac-Charles

=== Code-switching ===
Code-switching occurs frequently in Louisiana French but this is typical for many language contact situations. Code-switching was once viewed as a sign of poor education, but it is now understood to be an indication of proficiency in the two different languages that a speaker uses. Fluent Louisiana French speakers frequently alternate between French, English, and Creole, but less proficient speakers usually do not.

== Vocabulary ==
From a lexical perspective, Louisiana French differs little from other varieties of French spoken in the world. However, due to the unique history and development of the language, Louisiana French has many words that are unique to it or to select French varieties.

English	Louisiana French	Standard French	Notes
alligator	cocodrie	alligator	
car	un char	une voiture, une auto	†
ball	une pelote	un ballon	
boy	garçon	garçon	
catfish	une barbue	un poisson-chat	
children	les enfants	enfants	
cookie	une galette	un biscuit, un petit gâteau (sec)	
courthouse	une maison de cour	un tribunal, un palais de justice	
crawfish	écrevisse	écrevisse	
dollar (U.S. dollar), currency	un piastre	un dollar	†
dude	un bougre	un gars, un individu, un type	
eggplant, aubergine	une brème	une aubergine	
goat	un cabri	une chèvre	
noise	du train	du bruit	†
now (right now)	drette-là, asteur, asteur-là	maintenant, tout de suite	†
possum, opossum	un rat de bois	un opossum	
raccoon	un chaoui	un raton-laveur	
shoe	un soulier	une chaussure	†
shrimp	une chevrette	une crevette	
tail (of an animal)	une tcheu	une queue	
to look at	guetter, garder	regarder	
where, where to	àyoù, etyoù, éyoù	où	
why	quoi faire, pourquoi	pourquoi	

† The Louisiana French expression is also used at times in Canadian French, with "un soulier" used formally and other expressions used informally.

=== Native American influences ===
Term	Gloss	Origin
Bayou	Bayou	Choctaw bayuk
chaoui	raccoon	Choctaw or Mobilian: shaui
choupique	bowfin	Choctaw: shupik "mudfish"
latanier	palmetto	Carib: allatani
pacane	pecan	Algonquian via Mobilian
patassa	sunfish	Choctaw: patàssa "flat"
plaquemine	persimmon	Illinois via Mobilian: piakimin
tchoc	blackbird	Possibly Atakapa: t'sak

=== English influences ===
Il y avait une fois il drivait, il travaillait huit jours on et six jours off. Et il drivait, tu sais, six jours off. Ça le prendrait vingt-quatre heures straight through. Et là il restait quatre jours ici et il retournait. So quand la seconde fois ç'a venu, well, il dit, "Moi, si tu viens pas," il dit, "je vas pas." Ça fait que là j'ai été. Boy! Sa pauvre mère. "Vas pas!"

One time he was driving, he was working eight days on and six days off. And he was driving, y'know, six days off. It would take him twenty-four hours straight through. And he would stay here four days and then go back. So when the second time came, well, he said, "If you don't come," he said, "I'm not going." So I went. Boy! His poor mother. "Don't go!" she said. "Don't go!"

— Carl Blyth, French and Creole in Louisiana. New York, N.Y.: Plenum Press. p. 40. ISBN 0-306-45464-5.

Le samedi après-midi on allait puis ... wringer le cou de la volaille. Et le dimanche, well, dimanche ça c'était notre meilleure journée qu'on avait plus de bon manger. Ma mère freezait de la volaille et on avait de la poutine aux craquettes.

Saturday afternoon we would go ... wring the chicken's neck. And on Sunday, well, Sunday, that was our best day for eating well. My mother would freeze some chicken and we would have some poutine of croquettes.

— Carl Blyth, French and Creole in Louisiana. New York, N.Y.: Plenum Press. p. 41. ISBN 0-306-45464-5.

=== Creole influences ===
Francophones and creolophones have worked side-by-side, lived among one another, and have enjoyed local festivities together throughout the history of the state. As a result, in regions where both Louisiana French and Louisiana Creole are or used to be spoken, the inhabitants of the region often code-switch, beginning the sentence in one language and completing it in another.

== Varieties ==
Taxonomies for classing Louisiana French have changed over time.

In 1968, Lafayette native James Domengeaux, a former US Representative, created the Council for the Development of French in Louisiana (CODOFIL), whose mission was to oversee the promotion, visibility, and expansion of French language usage in Louisiana. His mission was clear: (re)create a European French bastion in Louisiana by making all Louisianans bilingual in International French and English. To accomplish his goals, he teamed up with political leaders in Canada and France, including former French President Georges Pompidou. He found Louisiana French too limiting, so he imported francophone teachers from Europe, Canada and the Caribbean to teach normative French in Louisiana schools. His penchant for International French caused him to lose support in Louisiana: most Louisianans, if they were going to have French in Louisiana schools, wanted Louisiana French, not "Parisian French."

Simultaneously, an ethnic movement took root in southern Louisiana led by Acadian-Creoles like James Donald Faulk, Dudley Joseph Leblanc and Jules O. Daigle. Faulk, a French teacher in Crowley, Louisiana, introduced using the term "Cajun French" for Acadian-Creoles and French Creoles who identified as Cajun, for which he created a curriculum guide for institutionalizing the language in schools in 1977. Roman Catholic Priest Jules O. Daigle, who in 1984 published his Dictionary of the Cajun Language, followed him. "Cajun French" is intended to imply the French spoken in Louisiana by descendants of Acadians, an ethnic qualifier rather than a linguistic relationship.

In 2009, Iberia Parish native and activist Christophe Landry introduced three terms representing lexical differences based on Louisiana topography: Provincial Louisiana French (PLF), Fluvial Louisiana French (FLF), and Urban Louisiana French (ULF). That same year, the Dictionary of Louisiana French: As Spoken in Cajun, Creole, and American Indian Communities, was published. It was edited by a coalition of linguists and other activists. The title clearly suggests that the ethno-racial identities are mapped onto the languages, but the language, at least linguistically, remains shared across those ethno-racial lines.

Due to present ethnic movements and internal subdivisions among the population, some of the state's inhabitants insist on ancestral varieties. As a result, it is not odd to hear the language referred to as Canadian French, Acadian French, Broken French, Old French, Creole French, Cajun French, and so on. Still other Louisiana francophones will simply refer to their language as French, without qualifiers. Internally, two broad distinctions will be made: informal Louisiana French and formal Louisiana French.

=== Informal Louisiana French ===
Probably the widely used variety of the language, informal Louisiana French has its roots in agrarian Louisiana, but it is now also found in urban centers because of urbanization beginning in the 20th century. Historically, along the prairies of southwest Louisiana, francophone Louisianans were cattle grazers as well as rice and cotton farmers. Along the bayous and the Louisiana littoral, sugar cane cultivation dominated and in many parishes today, sugar cultivation remains an important source of economy. Informal Louisiana French can at least be divided further into three core varieties: Fluvial, Provincial, and Bayou Lafourche Louisiana French.

The phonology of these varieties, apart from some minor distinctions, are rather similar and distinct in comparison to the international francophone community. A key feature of the dialect would likely be the pronunciation of the letter "r" as an alveolar consonant /ɾ/ rather than a uvular consonant like in Standard French. Vowels are commonly omitted from the beginning and end of for words: "américain → "méricain" or "espérer → spérer." Likewise, the letter "é" preceding "o" frequently erodes in the spoken informal varieties: "léonide → lonide" or "cléophas → clophas." The nasality and pitch of the language is akin to that associated with provincial speech in Québec. In terms of nasality, Louisiana French is similar to French spoken in Brussels and Dakar, Senegal. The pitch of Provincial Louisiana French and Provincial Quebec French share a predominantly agricultural history, close contact with Amerindian groups and relative isolation from urbanized populations.

==== Bayou Lafourche ====
Particular mention should be made to the francophones of Bayou Lafourche, who speak a linguistic feature that is absent everywhere else in Louisiana. Some francophones along Bayou Lafourche pronounce the letters "g" and "j" as a voiceless glottal fricative, but others pronounce the two letters in the manner of most other francophones.

Two theories exist to explain the feature:

1. Some activists and linguists attribute the feature to an inheritance of Acadian French spoken in Nova Scotia, New Brunswick and Prince Edward Island, a theory based entirely on observation of shared vocal features, rather than the communities being linked by migration.
2. On the other hand, it has been suggested that there may be a linguistic link to the Spanish-speaking Isleños living at the Mississippi River and Bayou Lafourche junction.

The Louisiana Creole spoken in Lafourche Parish in and around Kraemer, Choctaw, and Chackbay contains the letters "g" and "j," but they are voiced as they are in all other varieties of Louisiana and French that are spoken elsewhere.

==== Evangeline Parish ====
French in Evangeline Parish often hews closer to French from Canada and France, due to its relatively recent settlement by French immigrants and low settlement by Acadian refugees compared to other parts of Acadiana. Distinct features include optional affrication of /t, d/.

=== Formal Louisiana French ===
This variety is known for its use in all administrative and ecclesiastic documents, speeches, and literary publications. Also known as "Urban Louisiana French," "Colonial French," or "Plantation Society French," it is spoken primarily in the urban business centers of the state. Because those regions have historically been centers of trade and commerce with contact with French-speakers from Europe, it is regarded as a more conservative variety of the language. Areas in which the formal variety can be heard include New Orleans, Baton Rouge, St. Martinville, and other once important francophone business centers in the state. Generally, formal Louisiana French is maintained along strict class lines.

The phonology of formal Louisiana French shares much in common with Standard French to various degrees depending upon the speaker. As an example, speakers can be heard pronouncing "r" as a uvular constant as opposed to an alveolar. Furthermore, the pronunciation and the intonation of that variety can vary from European to the North American varieties of French. Use of the pronouns nous and vous is far more prevalent in this register, whereas nous has been supplanted by on in the informal varieties.

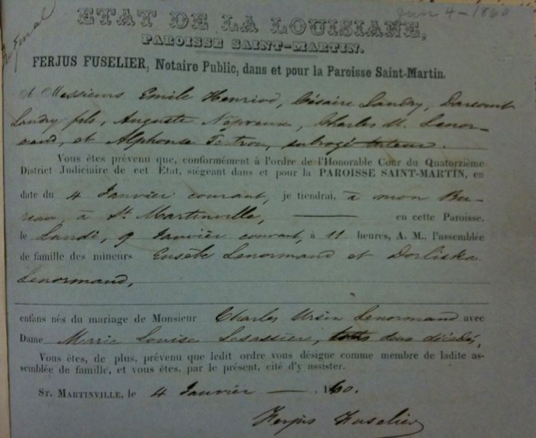
19th century Notarial document from St. Martinville

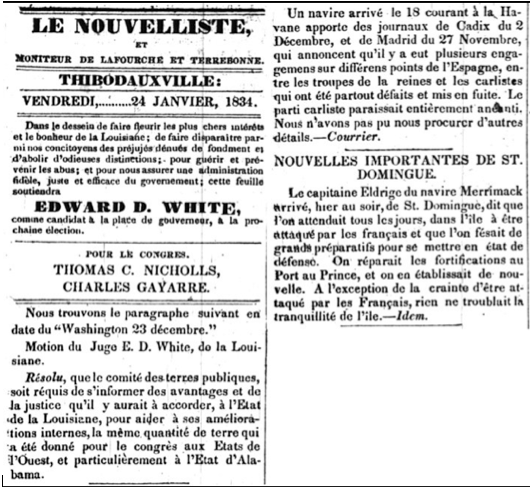
19th century Newspaper clipping from Thibodaux

== Phonology ==
=== Consonants ===
Consonant phonemes in Louisiana French
		Labial	Dental/ Alveolar	Palatal	Velar	Glottal
Nasal		m	n	ɲ^{1}	ŋ	
Stop	voiceless	p	t		k	
Stop	voiced	b	d		ɡ	
Affricate	voiceless			tʃ		
Affricate	voiced			dʒ		
Fricative	voiceless	f	s	ʃ		h
Fricative	voiced	v	z	ʒ		
Approximant	plain		l	j		
Approximant	labial			ɥ	w	
Rhotic			r			

^1[ɲ] is rarely used in practice, and is typically lenited to [j̃] with the preceding vowel nasalized, thus, "Espagne" [ɛspãj̃] 'Spain'. This feature moves Louisiana French closer to Haitian Creole "Espay" [ɛspaj] 'Spain' and even closer to Brazilian Portuguese "Espanha" [ispɐ̃j̃ɐ] 'Spain'.

Louisiana French consonants do not show severe differences from Metropolitan French consonants, except that unlike most of French spoken varieties, which use uvular varieties of r [ʀ, ʁ]; Louisiana French uses the classic alveolar trill or flap [r, ɾ], just like in Spanish, Italian, and several other Romance languages, e.g. français [frɑ̃sɛ] 'French'. In Terrebonne and Lafourche parishes, /ʒ/ may be pronounced as [h]. This can occasionally apply to /ʃ/, /s/, and /z/ as well.

Like in several colloquial varieties of French, some consonant clusters are reduced, especially the ones having the liquids /r/ and /l/. E.g. arbre /ɑrbr/ → [ɑrb] 'tree', possible /pɔsibl/ → [pɔsib] 'possible', astre /astr/ → [ast] → [as] 'star', juste /ʒyst/ → [ʒys] 'fair, just'.

In Evangeline parish and nearby areas, dental stops may be affricated before high front vowels and semivowels: in other words, /ty/, /ti/, /tɥ/, /tj/, /dy/, /di/, /dɥ/, /dj/ are then pronounced [t͡sy ~ t͡ʃy], [t͡si ~ t͡ʃi], [t͡sɥ ~ t͡ʃɥ], [t͡sj ~ t͡ʃj], [d͡zy ~ d͡ʒy], [d͡zi ~ d͡ʒi], [d͡zɥ ~ d͡ʒɥ], [d͡zj ~ d͡ʒj]. The degree of palatalization depends on the speaker; e.g. petit [pət͡si ~ pət͡ʃi] 'small, little'.

The velar stops /ky/, /ki/, /kɥ/, /kj/ are optionally affricated [t͡ʃy], [t͡ʃi], [t͡ʃɥ], [t͡ʃj], depending on the speaker; e.g. cuisine [t͡ʃɥizin] 'kitchen, cuisine'. This may apply more to Evangeline parish and nearby areas, but has also been cited as a widespread feature.

In some mesolects, just like in Haitian Creole, general pronunciation may become non-rhotic; e.g. parler /pɑrle/ → [pɑːle] 'to speak'.

=== Vowels ===
Oral
	Front		Central	Back
	unrounded	rounded	Central	Back
Close	i	y		u
Near-close	ɪ^{1}			ʊ^{1}
Close-mid	e	ø	ə	o
Open-mid	ɛ ~ æ	œ	ə	ʌ^{1}, ɔ
Open	a		ɑ	

Nasal
	Front		Back
	unrounded	rounded	Back
Close	ĩ^{2}	ỹ^{2}	ũ^{2}
Mid	ɛ̃	œ̃	ɔ̃
Open	ɑ̃		

^1Only occurs in words with English origin.

^2Only used as substitutes for /i, y, u/ when followed by a nasal consonant, or if a following [nj] was nasalized to [j̃]; merging /ɲ/ and /nj/ sequences.

In Louisiana French, [ɛ] is frequently lowered to either [æ] or [a], especially after /r/. /r/ is also either weakened or dropped in word-final positions after a vowel, leaving behind a lengthened vowel (e.g., [frɛr] → [frær] → [fræː]).

The /a - ɑ/ distinction seldom exists in Louisiana French. However, a is usually pronounced [ɑ ~ ɒ ~ ɔ] when making up the diphthong [wa], before /r/ and when being the last open syllable; e.g. fois [fwɑ ~ fwɒ ~ fwɔ] 'time' (frequence), mardi [mɑrd͡zi] 'Tuesday', rat [rɑ ~ rɒ ~ rɔ] 'rat'.

The maître - mettre /ɛː, ɛ/ distinction does not exist.

Like other French varieties, /ə/ can be omitted in fast speech, e.g. je peux /ʒə pø/ → [ʒ‿pø] → [ʃ‿pø] 'I can'.

Like in Quebec French, [i, y, u] may become laxed [ɪ, ʏ, ʊ], depending on the speaker; e.g. musique [myzik ~ myzɪk ~ mʏzɪk] 'music'.

Front rounded vowels are sometimes unrounded, with [y, ø, œ] becoming [i, e, ɛ], which notably causes tu to be rendered as [ti].

The four nasal vowels have evolved according to their own pattern, similarly, but not the same way, to French spoken by Haitians: /ɑ̃/ → [ã ~ ɑ̃ ~ ɒ̃], /ɛ̃/ → [ɛ̃ ~ ẽ], /œ̃/ → [œ̃ ~ ø̃], /ɔ̃/ → [ɔ̃ ~ õ].

Words pronounced in Classical French as /ɑ̃m/ and /ɑ̃n/ (using amm-, ann-, emm-, enn-), are pronounced [ɑm ~ ɒm ~ ɔm] and [ɑn ~ ɒn ~ ɔn] respectively, rather than [am] and [an] as in Modern French; e.g. femme [fɑm ~ fɒm ~ fɔm] 'woman', solennité [sɔlɑnite ~ sɔlɒnite ~ sɔlɔnite] 'solemnity', s'enamourer (de) /sɑ̃namure (də)/ 'to fall in love (with)'.

== Community ==
=== Healing practices ===
Folk healers (French: traiteur/traiteuse) are still found throughout the state. During their rituals for healing, they use secret French prayers to God or saints for a speedy recovery. These healers are mostly Catholic and do not expect compensation or even thanks, as it is said that then, the cure will not work.

=== Music ===
Louisiana French has been the traditional language for singing music now referred to as Cajun, zydeco, and Louisiana French rock. As of today, Old French music, Creole stomp, and Louisiana French rock remain the only three genres of music in Louisiana using French instead of English. Most "Cajun" artists have expressions and phrases in French in songs, predominantly sung in English.

=== French-language events ===
- Festival International de Louisiane
- Festivals Acadiens Et Créoles
- Association louisianaise des clubs français des écoles secondaires
- Francophone Open Microphone, Houma, Louisiana
- Louisiana Creole Families/Bastille Day Celebration, Ville Platte, Louisiana
- Bastille Day Fête, New Orleans Art Museum, New Orleans Louisiana
- Louisiana State University Night of French Cinema, Baton Rouge, Louisiana
- Rendez-vous des Cajuns, Liberty Theater, Eunice, Louisiana

==== La table française ====
Today one can find many local groups dedicated to practicing Louisiana French regularly, usually over a meal with other interested parties. Many of said groups can be found through the online Cajun French Virtual Table Française:

- Vermilion Parish Library, Abbeville, Louisiana
- NuNu's, Arnaudville, Louisiana
- La Madeleine's, Baton Rouge, Louisiana
- City Cafe on O'Neal Lane, Baton Rouge, Louisiana
- LSU Community Education Building Room C117, Eunice, Louisiana
- Ascension Parish Library, Galvez, Louisiana
- St. James Parish, Gramercy, Louisiana
- Acadiana PoBoys & Cajun Cuisine, Lafayette, Louisiana
- Dwyer's Café, Lafayette, Louisiana
- Blue Moon Saloon, Lafayette, Louisiana
- Carpe Diem, Lafayette, Louisiana
- Chez Bi Bi's Patisserie, Lafayette, Louisiana
- Johnston Street Java, Lafayette, Louisiana
- Lafayette Public Library South, Lafayette, Louisiana
- Paul and Lulu Hilliard University Art Museum, Lafayette, Louisiana
- Restaurant Pamplona, Lafayette, Louisiana
- Nanny's Restaurant, Marksville, Louisiana
- Marrero Senior Center, Marrero, Louisiana
- Victor's Cafeteria, New Iberia, Louisiana
- Carrollton Table Francaise, New Orleans, Louisiana
- Keller Library, New Orleans, Louisiana
- Le Vieux Village, Opelousas, Louisiana
- Java Square Cafe, Opelousas, Louisiana
- Ascension Parish Library Galvez Branch, Prairieville, Louisiana
- The Lafourche Central Market, Raceland, Louisiana
- Frog City Travel Plaza, Rayne, Louisiana
- The Bernard House, Rayne, Louisiana
- Begnaud House Heritage Visitor Center, Scott, Louisiana
- La Lafourche Parish Library, Thibodaux, Louisiana
- Wetlands Acadian Cultural Center, Thibodaux, Louisiana
- French Quarter Cajun Seafood Restaurant, Houston, Texas

== Media ==
=== Periodicals, newspapers, & publications ===
- Les éditions Tintamarre
- La Louisiane
- Le Bourdon de la Louisiane
- La revue de la Louisiane (defunct)

=== Radio ===
- KBON 101.1 FM: Mamou; "Louisiana Proud"
- KLEB 1600 AM: Golden Meadow; "The Rajun' Cajun"
- KRVS 88.7: Lafayette; "Radio Acadie"
- KVPI 1050 AM: Ville Platte; "The Legend"
- KVPI-FM 92.5 FM: Ville Platte; "Acadiana's Greatest Hits"

=== Television ===
==== Over-the-air ====
- KLFY-TV/10
- Louisiana Public Broadcasting (LPB)
- KNOE-TV/8

==== Cable/satellite ====
- TV5Monde

=== Podcasts ===
- Charrer-Veiller
- LACréole Show

=== Multimedia platforms ===
- New Niveau
- Télé-Louisiane

== Education ==
=== French-language Public School Curriculum ===
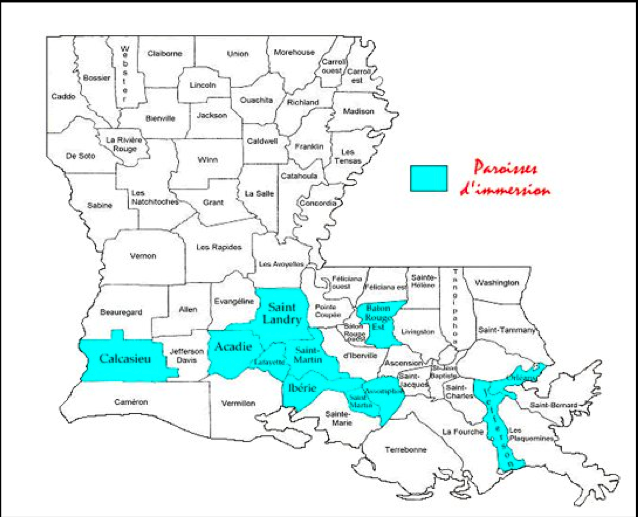
Parishes offering French immersion programs in 2011

As of autumn 2011, Louisiana had French-language total immersion or bilingual French and English immersion in ten parishes: Calcasieu, Acadia, St. Landry, St. Martin, Iberia, Lafayette, Assumption, East Baton Rouge, Jefferson and Orleans. The curriculum in both the total French-language immersion as well as in the bilingual program follows the same standards as all other schools in the parish and state.

The Council for the Development of French in Louisiana (CODOFIL) recruits teachers locally and globally each year. Additionally, Les Amis de l'Immersion, Inc. is the parent-teacher organization for students in French immersion in the state which organizes summer camps, fundraisers and outreach for teachers, parents and students in the program.

School	Grades	City	Parish
Church Point Elementary	K-4	Church Point	Acadia
Pierre Part Primary	K-4	Pierre Part	Assumption
Pierre Part Middle	5-8	Pierre Part	Assumption
Belle Rose Primary	K-2	Belle Rose	Assumption
Assumption High	9	Napoleonville	Assumption
Winbourne Elementary	K	Baton Rouge	East Baton Rouge
Henry Heights Elementary	K-5	Lake Charles	Calcasieu
Gillis Elementary	K-5	Lake Charles	Calcasieu
Prien Lake Elementary	K-5	Lake Charles	Calcasieu
Moss Bluff Middle	6-8	Lake Charles	Calcasieu
S.J. Welsh Middle	6-8	Lake Charles	Calcasieu
Alfred M. Barbe High	9-12	Lake Charles	Calcasieu
Daspit Elementary	K-6	New Iberia	Iberia
North Lewis Street Elementary	K-6	New Iberia	Iberia
S. J. Montgomery Elementary	K-3	Lafayette	Lafayette
Myrtle Place Elementary	K-3	Lafayette	Lafayette
Prairie Elementary	K-5	Lafayette	Lafayette
Evangeline Elementary	K-2	Lafayette	Lafayette
Vermilion Elementary	K-1	Lafayette	Lafayette
Edgar Martin Middle	6-7	Lafayette	Lafayette
Paul Breaux Middle	6-8	Lafayette	Lafayette
Audubon Montessori	K-8	New Orleans	Orleans
Ecole Bilingue de la Nouvelle-Orléans	Nursery-6	New Orleans	Orleans
Hynes Elementary	K-3	New Orleans	Orleans
International High School of New Orleans	9-10	New Orleans	Orleans
International School of Louisiana	K-8	New Orleans	Orleans
Lycée Français de la Nouvelle-Orleans	PK-12	New Orleans	Orleans
Park Vista Elementary	K-2	Opelousas	St. Landry
South Street	K-3	Opelousas	St. Landry
Cecilia Primary	K-3	Cecilia	St. Martin
Teche Elementary	4-6	Breaux Bridge	St. Martin
Cecilia Junior High	7-8	Cecilia	St. Martin
Cecilia High School	9-12	Cecilia	St. Martin

=== CODOFIL Consortium of Louisiana Universities and Colleges ===
The Consortium of Louisiana Universities and Colleges unites representatives of French programs in Louisiana universities and colleges, and organizes post-secondary level francophone scholastic exchanges and provide support for university students studying French language and linguistics in Louisiana:

- Centenary College of Louisiana
- Delgado Community College
- Dillard University
- Grambling State University
- Louisiana College
- Louisiana State University
- Louisiana Tech University
- Loyola University
- McNeese State University
- Nicholls State University
- Northwestern State University
- Our Lady of Holy Cross College
- Southeastern Louisiana University
- Southern University at Baton Rouge
- Southern University at New Orleans
- Tulane University
- University of Louisiana at Lafayette
- University of Louisiana at Monroe
- University of New Orleans
- Xavier University of Louisiana

== Notable French-speaking people from Louisiana ==
- Micaela Almonester, Baroness de Pontalba
- Barry Jean Ancelet
- Étienne de Boré
- Calvin Borel
- P.G.T. Beauregard
- Boozoo Chavis
- Clifton Chenier
- Kate Chopin
- John Delafose
- Rodolphe Desdunes
- James R. Domengeaux
- Michael Doucet
- Edwin Edwards
- Canray Fontenot
- Virginie Amélie Avegno Gautreau
- Richard Guidry
- Sidonie de la Houssaye
- Sybil Kein
- Jean Lafitte
- Iry LeJeune
- Marie Laveau
- Rosie Ledet
- Alfred Mercier
- Alexandre Mouton
- Alfred Mouton
- Stephen Ortego
- Glen Pitre
- Homère Plessy (of Plessy v. Ferguson)
- Zachary Richard
- Ambrose Sam
- Mabel Sonnier Savoie
- Ed Orgeron
- Doug Kershaw

== See also ==
- List of Louisiana parishes by French-speaking population
- Louisiana Creole
- Acadian French
- Missouri French
- New England French
- American French
- French language in the United States
- Council for the Development of French in Louisiana
