= Richard Guidry =

- Born: October 18, 1949; Gueydan, Louisiana
- Died: July 27, 2008 (aged 58); Lafayette, Louisiana
- Other name: Le gros Cadien
- Education: University of Southwestern Louisiana
- Known for: Contributions to French language in Louisiana
- Awards: Chevalier in the Ordre des Palmes Académiques

Richard Guidry (October 18, 1949 – July 27, 2008) was a Cajun cultural activist and educator who worked to save the French language in Louisiana.

Born in Gueyden, Louisiana, on October 18, 1949, Guidry (who referred to himself as Le gros Cadien 'The Big Cajun') attended the University of Southwestern Louisiana (now the University of Louisiana at Lafayette), where he obtained a bachelor's degree in French and Spanish and a master's degree in French education.

He subsequently taught French in St. Martin Parish, Louisiana, before working for the Louisiana Department of Education as Education Programs Coordinator in Foreign Languages and Bilingual Education (Region IV). In this post he introduced Louisiana French into the French education curriculum—a major advance considering the social stigma formerly attached to speaking the state's French dialects.

Richard taught Cajun French at his alma mater, where he served as an adjunct faculty member, and worked as a co-editor and consultant on the Dictionary of French as Spoken in Louisiana. He appeared in French-language theatrical productions and in documentary programs on radio and television, and he authored several publications, including C'est p'us pareil, a literary collection in the Cajun and Creole dialects.

For his contributions to the French language in Louisiana, France awarded Richard the title of Chevalier in the Ordre des Palmes Académiques in 1995.

Guidry died July 27, 2008, in Lafayette, Louisiana.
