= Mabel Sonnier Savoie =

American singer

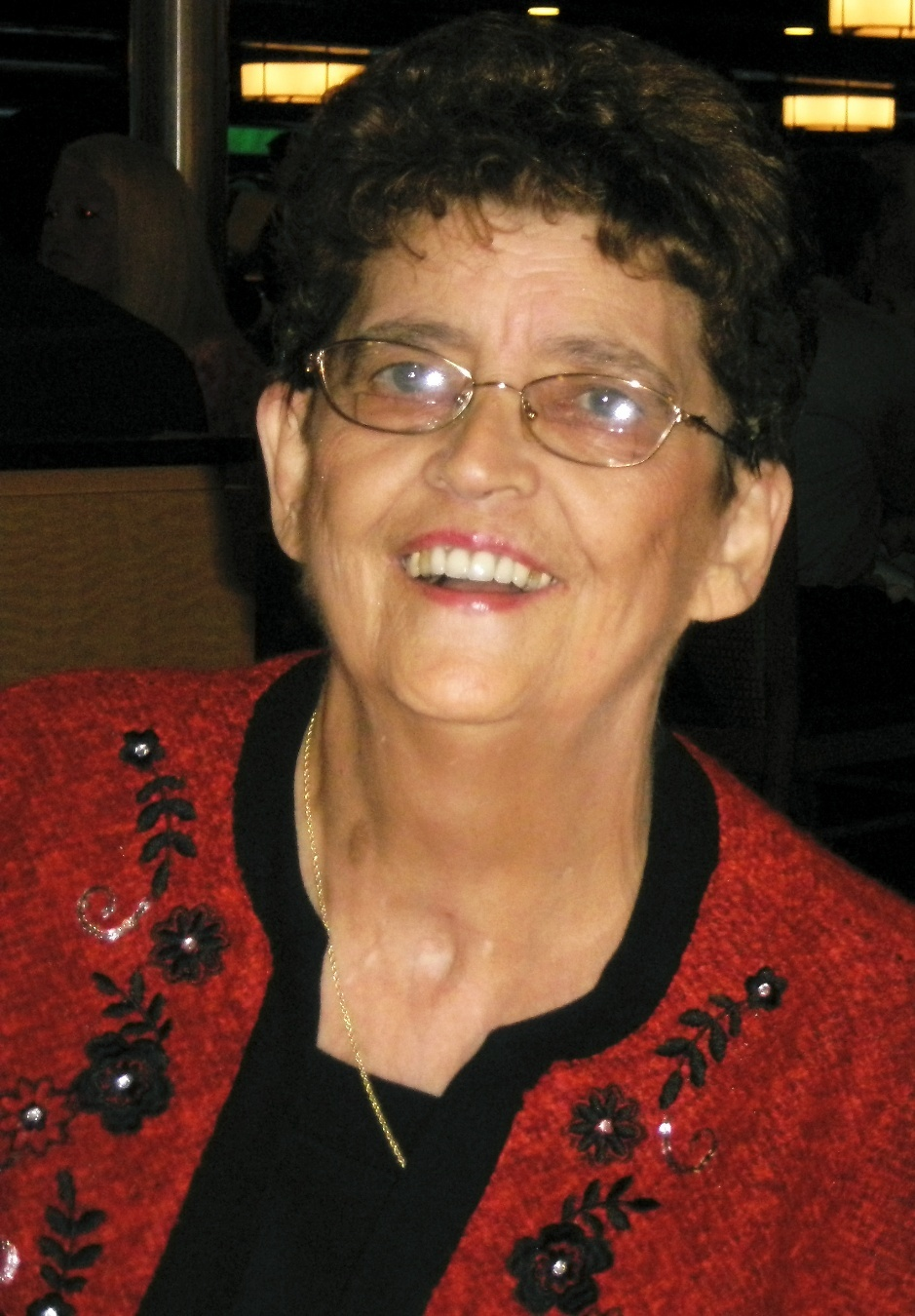
Mabel Sonnier Savoie in 2009.

Mabel Sonnier Savoie (October 4, 1939 – July 10, 2013) was an American singer and guitar player with roots in Southern Louisiana's country and western and Cajun music scene. She was one of the first solo female recording artists in Louisiana.

== Biography ==
Mabel Sonnier was born on October 4, 1939, in Opelousas, Louisiana. She began her career at age 7 with a public appearance in October 1946 at the Jennings Commission Barn where she won her first talent show and subsequently purchased her first guitar. She became a regular on the Happy Fats Amateur Hour. After the owner of KSLO radio in Opelousas heard Sonnier's powerful voice, he offered the young girl a chance to become a member of the Blue Room Gang, a local Cajun-Country band. One of Mabel's bandmates included Rod Bernard. In November 1950, the Blue Room Gang opened for Hank Williams.

This exposure eventually led to Sonnier's own radio program, as well as an 18-year stint on a morning radio program where every show began with the song "Bouquet of Roses". She was offered a contract with the Louisiana Hayride, but turned it down in order to focus on her growing family. In 1960, she was offered a record contract with AMA Records and recorded "Search My Heart" and "Just Like a Child" under the stage name "Kee North". In recognition of her accomplishment as one of the first females in Louisiana to secure a record contract, she was given the key to the City of Opelousas.

Sonnier took a break from performing, but returned in 1991, and became a featured performer at The Fort Bend Opry and the Texas Country Hoedown opry style shows and became known as the "Cajun Rose". Her signature song was her rendition of "Jolie Blon," a French standard sung entirely in the Cajun French language.

She died on July 10, 2013, in Porter, Texas.

== Sources ==
- Daily World Magazine, Opelousas, La., July 3, 1960.
- Daily World Magazine, Opelousas, La., October 26, 1969.
- Sunday Advocate, Baton Rouge, La., September 5, 1965.
