= Barry Jean Ancelet =

American folklorist (born 1951)

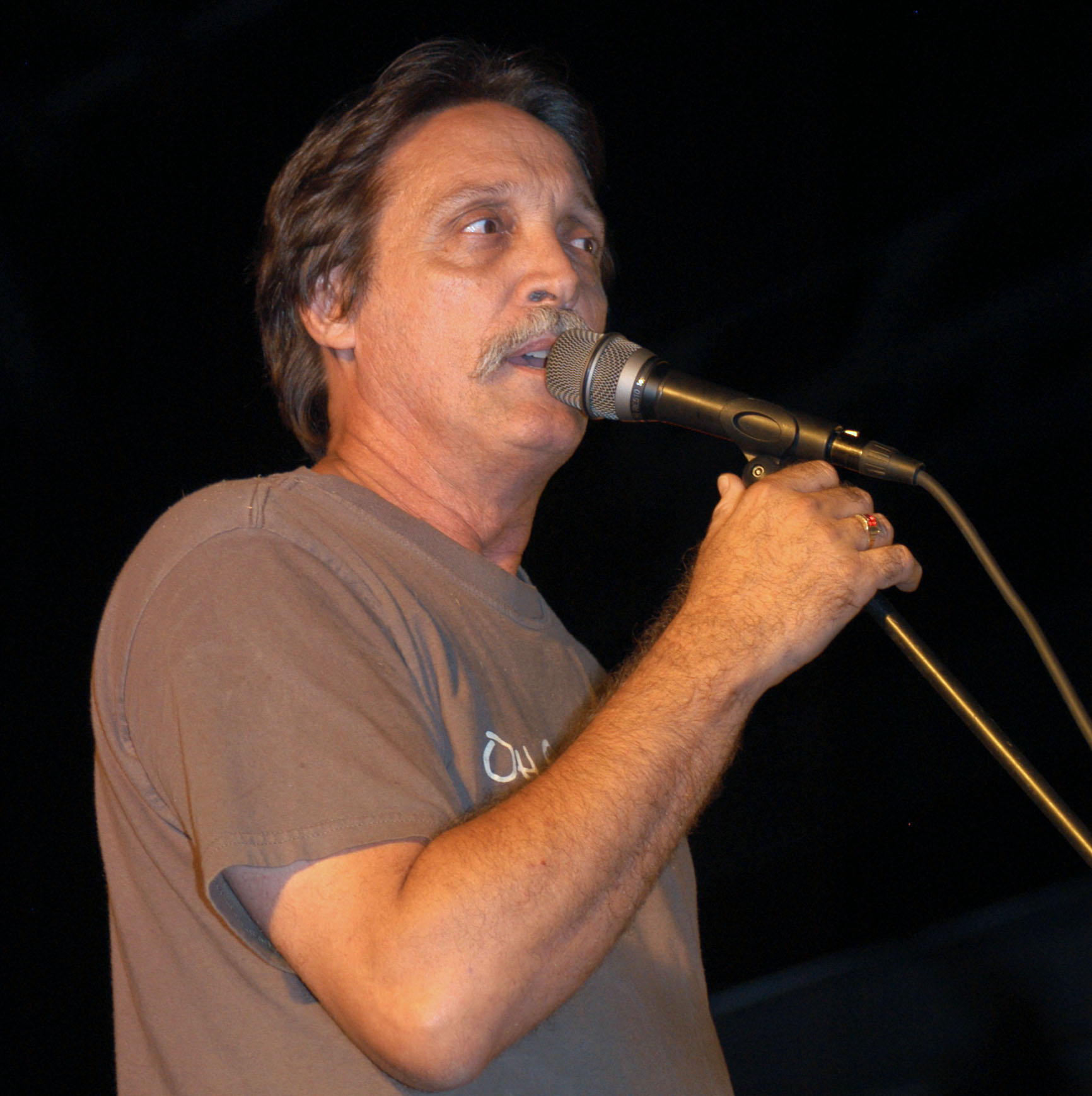
- Ancelet at Band Together – a concert to benefit Hurricane Katrina relief.
- Born: June 25, 1951 (age 75); Church Point, Louisiana, U.S.
- Other name: Jean Arceneaux
- Education: University of Southwestern Louisiana; Indiana University, Université de Provence
- Known for: Cajun folklorist, Cajun history
- Spouse: Carolyn Ancelet
- Children: 5

Barry Jean Ancelet (pseudonym Jean Arceneaux; born 1951) is a Cajun folklorist in Louisiana French and ethnomusicologist in Cajun music. He has written several books, and under his pseudonym Jean Arceneaux, including poetry and lyrics to songs.

== Early life and education ==
Born in Church Point, in Acadia Parish, Louisiana on 25 June 1951. He graduated from high school in 1969. He then graduated from the University of Southwestern Louisiana (now named the University of Louisiana at Lafayette) with a Bachelor of Arts in French in 1974. He received a Master of Arts in folklore from Indiana University Bloomington in 1977. Ancelet obtained a doctorate in 1984 in Études Créoles (anthropology and linguistics) from the Université de Provence, (Aix-Marseille I) in Aix-en-Provence, France.

== Career ==
=== Music festivals ===
Ancelet co-founded and acted as the Director the Tribute to Cajun Music, in 1974 and from 1976 to 1980, which became the annual Festivals Acadiens. He has also served as a Director as well as the President and member of the executive board for the Festival de Musique Acadienne/Cajun Music Festival since 1980.

=== Teaching ===
He has taught at the University of Louisiana at Lafayette, starting in 1977, first as the Director of the Center for Acadian and Creole Folklore (from 1977 to 1980), as a professor of Francophone Studies and Folklore (1977 to 1980), and he was a folklorist at the University of Louisiana at Lafayette, Center for Louisiana Studies (from 1980 to 1985).

Ancelet has served as Chair of University of Louisiana at Lafayette's Department of Modern Languages and as the first Director of the university's Center for Acadian and Creole Folklore — regarded as the largest compilation of media resources pertaining to these two south Louisiana ethnic groups.

=== Other work ===
Ancelet hosted the Rendez-vous des Cajuns, a live weekly music radio program on KRVS for more than a decade.

Ancelet has served as the chairman on the Louisiana Folklife Commission from 1984 to 1990.

Ancelet is a member of many organizations, including the l'Ordre des francophones d'Amérique, in Quebec, Canada; a fellow of the American Folklore Society; and a fellow of the Center for Cultural and Eco-Tourism at University of Louisiana at Lafayette.

== Honors and awards ==
In 2005, Ancelet was named the Willis Granger and Tom Debaillon BORSF Professor of Francophone Studies at University of Louisiana at Lafayette.

In 2008, he won the Américo Paredes Prize by the American Folklore Society.

In 2009, he was named Louisiana "Humanist of the Year" by the Louisiana Endowment for the Humanities.

== Publications ==
- Ancelet, Barry (1984). Makers of Cajun Music: Musiciens Cadiens Et Creoles. Elemore Morgan (photography) (1 ed.). University of Texas Press. ISBN 978-0292750791.
- Ancelet, Barry Jean (1989). Capitaine, Voyage Ton Flag: The Traditional Cajun Country Mardi Gras. Louisiana Life Series, Number 1. Center for Louisiana Studies, University of Southwestern Louisiana. ISBN 978-0940984462.
- Ancelet, Barry Jean (1989). Cajun Music: Its Origins and Development. Louisiana Life Series, Number 2. University of Louisiana at Lafayette. ISBN 978-0940984486.
- Ancelet, Barry Jean; Edwards, Jay; Pitre, Glen (1991). Cajun Country. Folklife in the South Series. University Press of Mississippi. ISBN 978-0878054671.
- Ancelet, Barry Jean (1994). Cajun and Creole Folktales: The French Oral Tradition of South Louisiana. University Press of Mississippi. ISBN 978-0878057092.
- Ancelet, Barry Jean; Gould, Philip (2007). One Generation at a Time: Biography of a Cajun and Creole Music Festival. Benny Graeff (contribution), David Simpson (contribution). University of Louisiana at Lafayette. ISBN 978-1887366809.
- Gould, Philip; Hebert, Sandy; Ancelet, Barry Jean (1984). Les Cadiens D'Asteur: Today's Cajuns. Galerie Press Incorporated. ISBN 978-0917541001.

=== As Jean Arceneaux ===
- Arceneaux, Jean (1994). Je Suis Cadien [I Am Cajun]. Merrick, New York: Cross-Cultural Communications.
- Arceneaux, Jean (1998). Suite du loup. Collection Acadie Tropicale. Moncton, Canada: Éditions Perce-Neige. ISBN 9782896910670.
- Arceneaux, Jean (2002). Je Suis Cadien [I Am Cajun]. Translated by St. Germain, Sheryl (French ed.). Merrick, New York: Cross-Cultural Communications. ISBN 978-0893042165. (published in French)

== Film ==
Year	Title	Type	Director(s)	Role	Notes
1989	I Went to the Dance (J'ai Été Au Bal)	documentary	Les Blank	narrator, self	Film about the history of music in Cajun Southwest Louisiana.
2007	It's in the Blood: Leo Abshire & the Cajun Tradition	documentary	Cyndi Moran, Eric Scholl	self	
2011	Mardi Gras: Feast Before Fast	documentary	Shereen Jerrett	self	

== See also ==
- Richard Guidry
