= Louisiana Creole =

French-based creole in Louisiana

- Kouri-Vini
- kouri-vini, kréyòl, fransé
- Native to: United States
- Region: Southern Alabama and Louisiana, (particularly St. Martin Parish, Natchitoches Parish, St. Landry Parish, Jefferson Parish, Lafayette Parish, Calcasieu Parish, Pointe Coupee Parish, Louisiana New Orleans, and Mobile); also in California (chiefly Southern California), Illinois, Arkansas, and in Texas (chiefly East Texas).
- Ethnicity: Louisiana French (Cajun, Creole)
- Native speakers: <10,000 (2023)
- Language family: Creole of African languages, lexified by French: Circum-Caribbean French; Louisiana Creole

Official status
- Official language in: Louisiana

Language codes
- ISO 639-3: lou
- Glottolog: loui1240
- ELP: Louisiana Creole
- Linguasphere: 51-AAC-ca
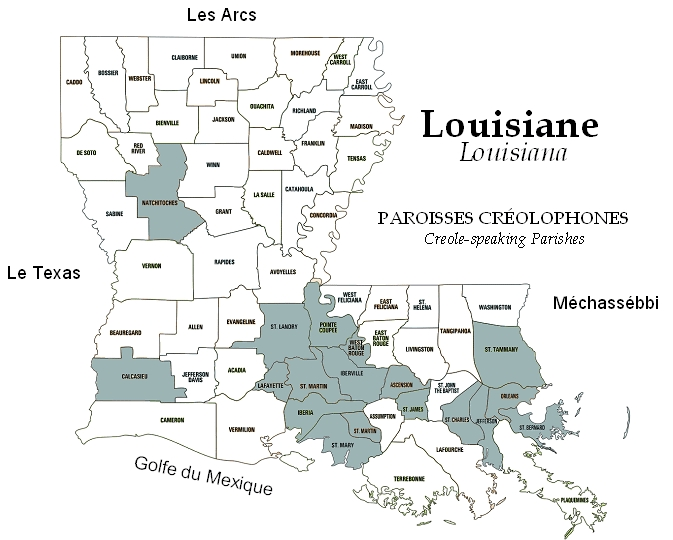
- Creole-speaking parishes in Louisiana

A man speaking Louisiana Creole.

Louisiana Creole, (Note: Louisiana Creole: kréyòl Lalwizyann; Louisiana French: créole louisianais) also known by the endonym Kouri-Vini (Louisiana Creole: kouri-vini), among other names, (Note: Including (in Creole) kréyòl, fransé/françé, gombo, patwa, or (pejoratively) nèg.) is a French-based creole language spoken by fewer than 10,000 people, mostly in the U.S. state of Louisiana. Today it is spoken by people who may racially identify as Black, mixed, White and Native American, as well as Cajun and Creole, making it important to distinguish between the Louisiana Creole language and Louisiana Creole identity. Its sister language is Louisiana French, a dialect of the French language. Many Louisiana Creoles do not speak the Louisiana Creole language and may instead use French or English as everyday languages. Due to its rapidly shrinking number of speakers, Louisiana Creole is considered an endangered language.

== Origins and historical development ==
Louisiana was colonized by the French and French Canadians from Quebec beginning in 1699, as well as by Acadians who were forced out of Acadia around the mid-18th century. Colonists were large-scale planters, small-scale homesteaders, and cattle ranchers; the French needed laborers, as they found the climate very harsh. They began to import enslaved Africans, as they had done in their Caribbean island colonies. Two-thirds of the slaves brought to Louisiana originated in the Senegambian region, speaking Malinke, Sereer, Wolof, Pulaar, and Bambara. The largest group from Senegambia was the Bambara, who spoke mutually intelligible dialects of the Malinke language.

The monopoly held by the Company of Indies in both Senegal and Louisiana may also have contributed to the Africans' relative ancestral homogeneity. Because of this homogeneity, retention of the Africans' indigenous languages may have hindered the development of a Creole in Louisiana. In fact, the Samba rebellion in 1731 was organized by the Bambara who were purportedly speaking their ancestral languages to plan the coup. Ultimately, Louisiana Creole developed, with West African languages becoming the substrates to a varied French lexifier. The importation of enslaved people by the French regime continued until 1743.

The language developed in 18th-century Louisiana from interactions among speakers of the lexifier language—Standard French—and several substrate or adstrate languages from Africa. Prior to its establishment as a creole, the precursor was considered a pidgin language. The social situation that gave rise to the Louisiana Creole language was unique, in that the lexifier language was the language found at the contact site. More often, the lexifier is the language that arrives at the contact site belonging to the substrate/adstrate languages. Neither the French, the French-Canadians, nor the enslaved Africans were native to the area; this fact categorizes Louisiana Creole as a contact language that arose between exogenous ethnicities. Once the pidgin tongue was transmitted to the next generation (who were considered the first native speakers of the new grammar) as a lingua franca, it could effectively be classified as a creole language.

No standard name for the language has existed historically. In the language, community members in various areas of Louisiana and elsewhere have referred to it by many expressions, though kréyol/kréyòl has been the most widespread. Until the rise of Cajunism in the 1970s and 80s, many Louisiana francophones also identified their language as Créole, since they self-identified as Louisiana Creoles. In Louisiana's case, self-identity has determined how locals identify the language they speak. This leads to linguistic confusion. To remedy this, language activists beginning in the 2010s began promoting the term Kouri-Vini, to avoid any linguistic ambiguity with Louisiana French.

The boundaries of historical Louisiana were first shaped by the French, then, in statehood after 1812, took on its modern form. By the time of the Louisiana Purchase by the U.S. in 1803, the boundaries came to include most of the Central United States, ranging from present-day Montana; parts of North Dakota, Wyoming, Colorado; all of South Dakota, Nebraska, and Kansas; part of Southeast Texas; all of Oklahoma; most of Missouri and Arkansas; as well as Louisiana.

In 1978, researchers located a document from a murder trial in the colonial period that acknowledges the existence of Louisiana Creole. The documentation does not include any examples of orthography or structure.

In an 1807 document, a grammatical description of the language is included in the experiences of an enslaved woman recorded by C.C. Robin. This was prior to arrival in Louisiana of French-speaking colonists and enslaved Africans from Saint-Domingue; the whites and free people of color (also French-speaking) were refugees from the Haitian Revolution, which had established the first empire in the Western Hemisphere. The statements collected from Robin showed linguistic features that are now known to be typical of Louisiana Creole.

The term Criollo ("Creole") appears in legal court documents during the Spanish colonial period (1762–1803); the Spanish reference to the language stated that it was used among enslaved people and whites.

The importation of enslaved Africans increased after France ceded the colony to Spain in 1763, following France's defeat by Great Britain in the Seven Years' War in Europe. Some Spaniards immigrated to the colony, but it was dominated by French language and culture. Like South Carolina, Louisiana had a "minority" population of Africans that greatly outnumbered the European settlers, including those white Creoles born in the colony.

== Language shift, endangerment and revitalization ==
In the case of Louisiana Creole, a diglossia resulted between Louisiana Creole and Louisiana French. Michael Picone, a lexicographer, proposed the term "Plantation Society French" to describe a version of French which he associated with plantation owners, plantation overseers, small landowners, military officers/soldiers and bilingual, free people of color, as being a contributor to Louisiana Creole's lexical base. Over the centuries, Louisiana Creole's negative associations with slavery stigmatized the language to the point where many speakers are reluctant to use it for fear of ridicule. In this way, the assignment of "high" variety (or H language) was allotted to standard Louisiana French and that of "low" variety (or L language) was given to Louisiana Creole and to Louisiana French.

The social status of Louisiana Creole further declined as a result of the Louisiana Purchase. Americans and their government made it illegal for francophones to speak their language. In 1921, the State of Louisiana mandated that public education take place in English only. Children and adults were often punished by corporal punishment, fines, and social degradation. By the 21st century, other methods were enforced. The promise of upward socioeconomic mobility and public shaming did the rest of the work, prompting many speakers of Louisiana Creole to abandon their stigmatized language in favor of English. Additionally, the development of industry, technology and infrastructure in Louisiana reduced the isolation of Louisiana creolophone communities and resulted in the arrival of more anglophones, resulting in further exposure to English. Because of this, Louisiana Creole exhibits more recent influence from English, including loanwords, code-switching and syntactic calquing.

Today, Louisiana Creole is spoken by fewer than 6,000 people. Though national census data includes figures on language usage, these are often unreliable in Louisiana due to respondents' tendencies to identify their language in line with their ethnic identity. For example, speakers of Louisiana Creole who identify as Cajuns often label their language 'Cajun French', though on linguistic grounds their language would be considered Louisiana Creole.

Efforts to revitalize French in Louisiana have placed emphasis on Cajun French, to the exclusion of Creole. Zydeco musician Keith Frank has made efforts through the use of social media not only to promote his music, but to preserve his Creole heritage and language as well, most notably through the use of Twitter. Additionally, Frank developed a mobile application in 2012 titled the "ZydecoBoss App", which acts as a miniature social network linked to a user's Facebook and Twitter accounts, allowing users to provide commentary in real time amongst multiple platforms. Aside from social media activism, Frank also created a creole music festival in 2012 called the "Creole Renaissance Festival", which acts a celebration of Creole culture.

A small number of community organizations focus on promoting Louisiana Creole, for example CREOLE, Inc. and the "Creole Table" founded by Velma Johnson. Northwestern State University developed the Creole Heritage Center, designed to bring people of Louisiana Creole heritage together, as well as preserve Louisiana Creole through their Creole Language Documentation Project. In addition, there is an active online community of language learners and activists engaged in language revitalization, led by language activist Christophe Landry.

These efforts have resulted in the creation of a popular orthography, a digitalized version of Valdman et al.'s Louisiana Creole Dictionary, and a free spaced repetition course for learning vocabulary hosted on Memrise created by a team led by Adrien Guillory-Chatman. A first language primer was released in 2017 and revised into a full-length language guide and accompanying website in 2020. 2022 saw the publication of an anthology of contemporary poetry in Louisiana Creole, the first book written completely in the language. A December 2023 article in The Economist highlighted revitalization efforts with the headline "Louisiana Creole is enjoying a modest revival," focusing in particular on language activists Jourdan Thibodeaux and Taalib Pierre-Auguste.

== Geographic distribution ==
Speakers of Louisiana Creole are mainly concentrated in south and southwest Louisiana. St. Martin Parish is the heart of the Creole-speaking region. Other sizeable communities exist along Bayou Têche in St. Landry, Avoyelles, Iberia, and St. Mary Parishes. There are smaller communities on False River in Pointe-Coupée Parish, in Terrebonne Parish, and along the lower Mississippi River in Ascension, St. Charles Parish, and St. James and St. John the Baptist parishes.

There once were creolophones in Natchitoches Parish on Cane River and sizable creolophone communities in adjacent Southeast Texas (Beaumont, Houston, Port Arthur, Galveston) and the Chicago area. Natchitoches, being the oldest colonial settlement in Louisiana, proved to be predominantly creole since its inception. Native inhabitants of the local area Louisiana Creole speakers in California reside in Los Angeles, San Diego and San Bernardino Counties and in Northern California (the San Francisco Bay Area and Sacramento, Plumas, Tehama, Mono, and Yuba Counties). Historically, there were Creole-speaking communities in Arkansas, Mississippi, and Alabama (on Mon Louis Island); however, it is likely that no speakers remain in these areas.

== Phonology ==
The phonology of Louisiana Creole has much in common with those of other French-based creole languages. In comparison to most of these languages, however, Louisiana Creole diverges less from the phonology of French in general and Louisiana French in particular. This may be due to the language's strong tendency toward decreolization.

=== Consonants ===
Consonants of Louisiana Creole
		Labial	Alveolar	Postalveolar	Velar
Nasal		m	n	ɲ	ŋ
Plosive/ Affricate	voiceless	p	t	tʃ	k
Plosive/ Affricate	voiced	b	d	dʒ	ɡ
Fricative	voiceless	f	s	ʃ	
Fricative	voiced	v	z	ʒ	
Tap			ɾ		
Lateral			l		

The table above shows the consonant sounds of Louisiana Creole, not including semivowels /j/ and /w/. In common with Louisiana French, Louisiana Creole features postalveolar affricates /tʃ/ and /dʒ/, as in /tʃololo/ ‘weak coffee’ and /dʒɛl/ ‘mouth’. The nasal palatal /ɲ/ usually becomes nasal palatal approximant /j̃/ when between vowels, which results in the preceding vowel becoming nasalized. At the end of a word, it typically is replaced by /n/ or /ŋ/.

=== Vowels ===
Oral and nasal vowels of Louisiana Creole
		Front		Central	Back
		unrounded	rounded	Central	Back
Close	oral	i	y		u
Close-mid	oral	e	ø		o
Open-mid	oral	ɛ	œ		ɔ
Open-mid	nasal	ɛ̃	œ̃		ɔ̃
Open	nasal				ɑ̃
Open	oral			a	

The table above shows the oral and nasal vowels of Louisiana Creole as identified by linguists.

==== Vowel rounding ====
Speakers of the language may use rounded vowels [y], [ø] and [œ] where they occur in French. This is subject to a high degree of variation with the same region, sociolinguistic group, and even within the same speaker. Examples of this process include:

- diri~duri (/diri/~/dyri/) 'rice', compare French du riz (/dyri/)
- vyé~vye (/vje/~/vjø/) 'old', compare French vieux (/vjø/)
- djèl~djœl (/dʒɛl/~/dʒœl/) 'mouth', compare Louisiana French djeule (/dʒœl/)

==== Vowel lowering ====
The open-mid vowel [ɛ] may be lowered to the near-open vowel [æ] when followed by [ɾ], e.g. frè~frær ([fɾɛ]~[fɾæɾ]) 'brother'.

==== Regressive and progressive vowel nasalization ====
In common with Louisiana French, Louisiana Creole vowels are nasalized where they precede a nasal consonant, e.g. jènn [ʒɛ̃n] 'young', pomm [pɔ̃m] 'apple'. However, unlike most varieties of Louisiana French, Louisiana Creole also exhibits progressive nasalization: vowels following a nasal consonant are nasalized, e.g. konnin [kɔ̃nɛ̃] 'to know'.

== Grammar ==
Louisiana Creole exhibits subject-verb-object (SVO) word order.

=== Determiners ===
In 19th-century sources, determiners in Louisiana Creole appear related to specificity. Bare nouns are non-specific. As for specific nouns, if the noun is presupposed it took a definite determiner (-la, singular; -la-ye, plural) or by an indefinite determiner (en, singular; de or -ye, plural). Today, definite articles in Louisiana Creole vary between the le, la and lê, placed before the noun as in Louisiana French, and post-positional definite determiners -la for the singular, and -yé for the plural. This variation is but one example of the influence of Louisiana French on Louisiana Creole, especially in the variety spoken along the Bayou Têche which has been characterized by some linguists as decreolized, though this notion is controversial.

Some speakers of that variety display a highly variable system of number and gender agreement, as evidenced in possessive pronouns.

==== Personal pronouns ====
	Subject	Objective	Possessive
1st person	mo	mò/mwin	mô; (mâ (sg. fem.); mê (pl.))
2nd person	to	twa	tô; (tâ; tê)
3rd person	li	li	sô; (sâ; sê)
1st plural	nou, no, nouzòt	nouzòt	nou, nô, nouzòt
2nd plural	vouzòt, ouzòt, zòt, zo	vouzòt, zòt	vouzòt
3rd plural	yé	yé	yê

Possession is shown by noun-noun possessum-possessor constructions (e.g. lamézon mô papa 'house (of) my grandfather') or with the preposition a (e.g. lamézon a mô papa 'house of my grandfather').

=== Verbs ===
==== Verbal morphology ====
Older forms of Louisiana Creole featured only one form of each verb without any inflection, e.g. [mɑ̃ʒe] 'to eat'. Today, the language typically features two verb classes: verbs with only a single form (e.g. bwa [bwɑ] 'to drink') and verbs with a 'long' or 'short' form (e.g. manjé [mɑ̃ʒe], manj [mɑ̃ʒ] 'to eat').

==== Tense, aspect, mood ====
Like other creole languages, Louisiana Creole features preverbal markers of tense, aspect and mood as listed in the table below.

Form	Classification	Meaning	Notes
té	Anterior	Past state of adjectives and stative verbs; pluperfect or habitual past of non-stative verbs	
apé, ap, é	Progressive	Ongoing actions	Form é is only used in Pointe Coupée
a, va, alé	Future	Future actions	
sa	Future	Future states	
sé	Conditional	Actions or states which might take place	
bin	Remote past	"an action or state that began before, and continued up to, a subsequent point in time"	Likely a borrowing from African-American English

== Vocabulary ==
The vocabulary of Louisiana Creole is primarily of French origin, as French is the language's lexifier. Some local vocabulary, such as topography, animals, and plants, are of American Indian origin. In the domains of folklore and Voodoo, the language has a small number of vocabulary items from West and Central African languages. Much of this non-French vocabulary is shared with other French-based creole languages of North America, and Louisiana Creole shares all but a handful of its vocabulary with Louisiana French.

== Writing system ==
Louisiana Creole has never had a standard, universal orthography. For example, /tʃwe/ ('to kill') could variably be rendered tchué, tchwé, chwé, and so on. Historically, Louisiana Creole was often written in French-based or "pan-Creole" orthographies, the latter reminiscent of Haitian Creole writing. In the most recent popular orthographic system (described below), the Louisiana Creole alphabet consists of twenty-three letters of the ISO basic Latin alphabet (excluding c, q, and x) and several special letters and diacritics.

Letter	Name	Name (IPA)	Diacritics	Phoneme correspondence
A a	a	/a/	Á á, (À à), Â â	/a/
Æ æ	æ	/æ/		/æ/
B b	bé	/be/		/b/
Ç ç	çé	/se/		/s/
D d	dé	/de/		/d/
E e	e	/ə/	É é, È è, Ê ê	/ə/; é = /e/; è = /ɛ/
F f	èf	/ɛf/		/f/
G g	gé	/ɡe/		/ɡ/
H h	hash	/haʃ/		/h/
I i	i	/i/	Í í, Ì ì, Î î	/i/; ì = /ɪ/
J j	ji	/ʒi/		/ʒ/
K k	ka	/ka/		/k/
L l	èl	/ɛl/		/l/
M m	èmm	/ɛ̃m/		/m/
N n	ènn	/ɛ̃n/		/n/
Ñ ñ	ñé	/ɲe/		/ɲ/
O o	o	/o/	Ó ó, Ò ò, Ô ô	/o/; ò = /ɔ/
Œ œ	œ	/œ/		/œ/
P p	pé	/pe/		/p/
R r	ær, èr	/æɾ/, /ɛɾ/		/r/
S s	ès	/ɛs/		/s/
T t	té	/te/		/t/
U u	u	/y/	Û û	/y/
V v	vé	/ve/		/v/
W w	double-vé	/dubləve/		/w/
Y y	igrèk	/iɡɾɛk/		/j/
Z z	zèd	/zɛd/		/z/

Digraph	Name	Name (IPA)	Phoneme correspondence
ch	ché	/tʃe/	/tʃ/
dj	djé	/dʒe/	/dʒ/
ou	ou	/u/	/u/
sh	shé	/ʃe/	/ʃ/
Nasals			
an, am, en, em			/ɑ̃/
in, im			/ɛ̃/
on, om			/ɔ̃/
un, um			/œ̃/

== Language samples ==
=== Numbers ===
Number	Louisiana Creole	IPA	Louisiana French	IPA
1	un, in	/œ̃, ɛ̃/	un (ein)	/ɛ̃/
2	dé	/de/	deux	/dø/
3	trwa, trò	/tɾwa, tɾɔ/	trois	/tɾwa/
4	kat	/kat/	quatre	/kat(ɾ)/
5	sink	/sɛ̃k/	cinq	/sɛ̃k/
6	sis	/sis/	six	/sis/
7	sèt	/sɛt/	sept	/sɛt/
8	wit	/wit/	huit	/ɥit/
9	nèf	/nɛf/	neuf	/nœf/
10	dis	/dis/	dix	/dis/
11	onz	/ɔ̃z/	onze	/ɔ̃z/
12	douz	/duz/	douze	/duz/
13	trèz	/tɾɛz/	treize	/tɾɛz/
14	katòrz	/katɔɾz/	quatorze	/katɔɾz/
15	kinz	/kɛ̃z/	quinze	/kɛ̃z/
16	sèz	/sɛz/	seize	/sɛz/
17	dis-sèt	/disɛt/	dix-sept	/disɛt/
18	diz-wit	/dizwit/	dix-huit	/dizɥit/
19	diz-nèf	/diznɛf/	dix-neuf	/diznœf/
20	vin	/vɛ̃/	vingt	/vɛ̃/
30	trent	/tɾɑ̃t/	trente	/tɾɑ̃t/
40	karant	/kaɾɑ̃t/	quarante	/kaɾɑ̃t/
50	sinkant	/sɛ̃kɑ̃t/	cinquante	/sɛ̃kɑ̃t/
60	swasant	/swasɑ̃t/	soixante	/swasɑ̃t/
70	swasant-dis	/swasɑ̃tdis/	soixante-dix	/swasɑ̃tdis/
80	katré-vin	/katɾevɛ̃/	quatre-vingts	/katɾəvɛ̃/
90	katré-vin-dis	/katɾevɛ̃dis/	quatre-vingt-dix	/katɾəvɛ̃dis/
100	sen	/sɑ̃/	cent	/sɑ̃/
1,000	mil	/mil/	mille	/mil/

=== Greetings ===
Louisiana Creole	French	English
Bonjou!	Bonjour!	Hello!
Konmen lê zafær?	Comment ça va?	How are things?
Komen ça va? / Komen ç'apé kouri?	Comment ça va?	How are you doing?
Mo byin, mærsi.	Je vais bien, merci.	I'm good, thanks.
Wa (twa) pli tar.	À plus tard.	See you later.
Mo linm twa.	Je t'aime.	I love you.
Swènn-twa / swiñ-twa.	Prenez soin de vous/toi.	Take care.
Bonjou / Bonmatin.	Bonjour.	Good morning.
Bonswa.	Bonsoir.	Good evening.
Bonnwi / Bonswa.	Bonne nuit.	Good night.

=== The Lord's Prayer ===
Catholic prayers are recited in French by speakers of Louisiana Creole. Today, some language activists and learners are leading efforts to translate the prayers.

Nouzòt Popá, ki dan syèl-la
Tokin nom, li sinkifyè,
N'ap spéré pou to
rwayonm arivé, é n'a fé ça
t'olé dan syèl; parèy si latær
Donné-nou jordi dipin tou-lé-jou,
é pardon nouzòt péshé paréy nou pardon
lê moun ki fé nouzòt sikombé tentasyon-la,
Mé délivré nou depi mal.

== See also ==
- Louisiana Creole people
- Louisiana French
- Haitian Creole
- Isleño Spanish
- Arkansas Creoles
