= List of people related to Cajun music =

This is a list of notable Cajun musicians, Cajun music instrument makers, Cajun music folklorists, Cajun music historians, and Cajun music activists.

== List of Cajun musicians ==
This is a list of musicians who perform or performed Cajun music. The musicians are not necessarily Cajuns, nor necessarily limited to Louisiana musicians.

=== Traditional Cajun ===
- Amédé Ardoin, accordion
- Bois Sec Ardoin
- Breaux Brothers, accordion, fiddle, guitar trio
- Cléoma Breaux, guitar
- Sady Courville, fiddle
- Joe Falcon, accordion
- Canray Fontenot, fiddle
- Wade Fruge, fiddle
- Blind Uncle Gaspard
- Mayeus Lafleur
- Dennis McGee, fiddle
- Segura Brothers
- Leo Soileau

=== Country/Texas swing Cajun ===
- Hadley J. Castille, fiddle
- Harry Choates, fiddle
- Varise Conner
- Luderin Darbone
- Edwin Duhon
- J. B. Fuselier
- Doc Guidry
- Hackberry Ramblers
- Julius "Papa Cairo" Lamperez
- Leroy "Happy Fats" Leblanc

=== Dancehall Cajun ===
- Nathan Abshire and the Pinegrove Boys
- Sidney Brown and the Traveler Playboys
- Camey Doucet
- Iry LeJeune
- Phil Menard
- Austin Pitre
- Belton Richard, accordion
- Aldus Roger and the Lafayette Playboys
- Lawrence Walker and the Wandering Aces

=== Cajun "renaissance" ===
- Balfa Brothers, fiddlers and guitarists
- Dewey Balfa, fiddle
- BeauSoleil
- Charivari
- Octa Clark
- Michael Doucet, fiddle
- Harrison Fontenot
- Alan LaFleur, upright bass
- D.L. Menard
- Zachary Richard, accordion
- Ann Savoy, guitarist, singer, author
- Marc Savoy, accordion
- Steve Riley and the Mamou Playboys
- Jourdan Thibodeaux, fiddle
- Feufollet

=== Contemporary Cajun music ===
- Christine Balfa
- Lee Benoit
- Joe Hall
- Hunter Hayes
- The Lost Bayou Ramblers
- Kevin Naquin
- Pine Leaf Boys
- The Red Stick Ramblers
- The Revelers
- Steve Riley and the Mamou Playboys
- Joel Savoy, fiddler, music producer
- Wilson Savoy, accordion
- Wayne Toups and his legendary roadie Johnny Opelousas

=== Other Cajun musicians/groups ===
==== Solo artists ====
- Al Berard
- Octa Clark
- Camey Doucet
- L. J. Foret
- J. B. Fuselier
- Blind Uncle Gaspard
- David Greely
- Hunter Hayes
- Doc Guidry
- Doug Kershaw
- Rusty Kershaw
- Mayeus Lafleur
- Sonny Landreth
- Iry LeJeune
- D.L. Menard
- Jimmy C. Newman
- Austin Pitre
- Crystal Plamondon
- Belton Richard, accordion
- Zachary Richard, accordion
- Ann Savoy
- Joel Savoy
- Wilson Savoy
- Amanda Shaw
- Leo Soileau
- Jo-El Sonnier, vocals
- Lawrence Walker
- Kevin Wimmer

==== Bands ====
- Nathan Abshire and the Pinegrove Boys
- Balfa Brothers
- Breaux Brothers
- Captain Gumbo (Netherlands band)
- Hackberry Ramblers
- Red Stick Ramblers
- Belton Richard and the Musical Aces
- The Sundown Playboys
- Lisa Haley and the Zydekats

=== Other Cajun musicians playing non-Cajun music ===
- Johnnie Allan, swamp pop musician
- Rod Bernard, swamp pop musician
- John Fred, swamp pop & rock and roll musician
- Sammy Kershaw, country music artist
- Warren Storm, swamp pop musician
- Rufus Thibodeaux, Cajun and country music artist (fiddler)

== Other related Cajun music producers, authors, folklorists, historians, and activists ==
- Barry Ancelet, folklorist, cultural activist
- Ryan Brasseaux, cultural historian
- Carl A. Brasseaux, historian
- Kevin Fontenot, historian
- Richard Guidry, cultural activist
- Harry Oster, LSU folklorist, recorded in the 1950s
- Ann Savoy, guitarist, singer, author, and record producer

== List of Cajun instrument makers ==
- Sidney Brown, accordion builder and player
- Andre Michot, accordion builder
- Larry Miller, accordion builder
- Marc Savoy, accordion builder and player, cultural activist

== See also ==
- List of Cajuns
- Cajun French Music Association
- History of Cajun music
