= Harrison Fontenot =

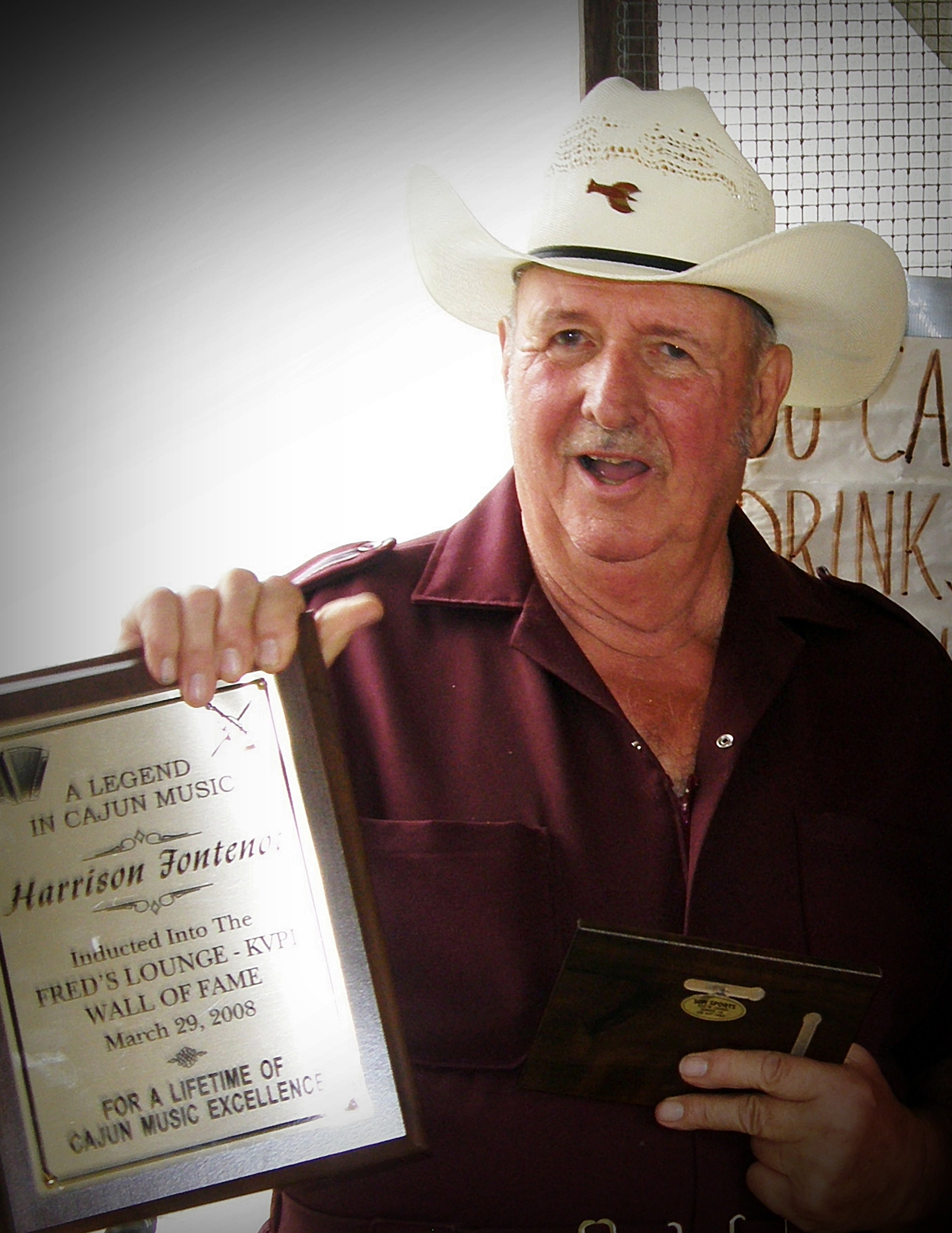
- Harrison Fontenot: Inducted into the Fred's Lounge – KVPI Wall of Fame

Background information
- Born: 1934 (age 91–92) Died January 21, 2011
- Genres: Cajun
- Occupations: Musician, songwriter, accordion player
- Instrument: Accordion
- Label: Swallow Records

Harrison Fontenot (August 1, 1934 – January 21, 2011) was a Cajun accordion player and builder, best known for his recording of "The Cajun Twist" in 1962.

Born in Point Blue, Louisiana in 1934, Fontenot was first introduced to the accordion at the age of 16, when he regularly practiced on one while his father was at work, listening to the Grand Ole Opry as well as Aldus Roger and Austin Pitre. After forming his band, the Cajun Trio, he recorded songs during the 1960s and 1970s such as "La Cravat", "Smoke, Smoke that Cigarette", "If Teardrops Were Pennies", "I Passed in Front of your Door", "Jealous Heart", and several holiday songs. In 2001, Fontenot was designated a Master Accordion Player and Master Accordion Maker at the Mamou Cajun Music Festival. Fontenot began making accordions under the brand name Imperial.

== Discography ==
- Merry Cajun Christmas (LP-SW6036 Swallow Records)
- 21 Cajun Classics (SW6079 Swallow Records)
- Cajun Classics: Kings of Cajun at Their Very Best (ACE820 Ace Records 2002)

== See also ==
- List of Notable People Related to Cajun Music
