= Iry LeJeune =

American musician

- Also known as: Iry
- Born: October 27, 1928
- Origin: Pointe Noire, Louisiana, U.S
- Died: October 8, 1955 (aged 26)
- Genres: Cajun music
- Occupations: Accordion player
- Instruments: Accordion
- Labels: FolkStar; Opera

Ira "Iry" LeJeune (October 27, 1928 – October 8, 1955) was one of the best selling and most popular Cajun musicians in the mid to late 1940s into the early 1950s.

His recordings and repertoire remain influential to the present day. He was among a handful of recording artists who returned the accordion to prominence in commercially recorded Cajun music and dance hall performances. The return of the accordion contrasted with the popular Cajun recorded output of the late 1930s and 1940s, a time during which fiddles and Western Swing sounds from Texas were influencing Cajun music. The return of the accordion to prominence is referred to as a Cajun music renaissance, i.e. a return to the roots and rebirth in Cajun pride in their traditional music. Iry LeJeune is regarded as one of the best and most beloved Cajun accordionists and singers of all time.

== Early life ==
Iry LeJeune was born October 27, 1928, on a modest sharecropping farm at Pointe Noire, a rural area near Church Point, LA. LeJeune came from a family that embraced music and his father, Agness LeJeune, taught him the rudiments of accordion at an early age. LeJeune's uncle, Angelas LeJeune, an excellent accordion player who'd made 78s in the 1920s, also encouraged him, often showing LeJeune traditional songs on his instrument. Nearly blind, music provided happiness for LeJeune, and as he grew older, he relied on it to make a living. Besides his uncle, LeJeune's major influence was Amédé Ardoin, the Creole accordion player who made several records in the 1930s - "Jolie Catin" and "Les Blues De Voyage" among others – and was popular at white and Creole dances in the area. LeJeune selected Ardoin's repertoire and adopted the emotive crying style of vocals that would eventually become his trademark.

Unable to work in the fields because of his poor eyesight, as a youth, LeJeune entertained the local sharecroppers. By the time he reached his teens, LeJeune was making a few dollars on weekends playing dances around Church Point, and occasionally traveling as far as Eunice, LA to perform. At the conclusion of World War II, LeJeune moved west to Lacassine, Louisiana (near Lake Charles, LA) where there were many more venues in which to play music.

== Cajun Renaissance ==
Initially, LeJeune found the going tough because at the time the accordion and Cajun music had become unpopular, as it was being replaced by the fiddle and Western Swing music. In postwar Louisiana, many felt Acadiana should assimilate with the rest of America and eliminate the French language, culture and music.

Luckily, in 1946 LeJeune met fiddler Floyd LeBlanc. Together they traveled to Houston, Texas where they recorded "Love Bridge Waltz" and "Evangeline Special" on Leblanc's "Opera" label with Virgil Bozeman's Oklahoma Tornadoes supporting. The disc was the turning point in LeJeune's career and for Cajun music. For the first time in nearly a decade, the accordion again wailed from radios and jukeboxes, largely due to many Cajuns returning home from World War II eager to hear their own Cajun music. Cajun listeners responded by buying great quantities of the release. LeJeune stayed in Houston with LeBlanc, performing and enjoying the popularity of the record, but returned to Louisiana after six months.

Upon returning to Lacassine, LeJeune went to radio station KPLC in Lake Charles and asked to perform on the air. The station manager wasn't keen on hearing the primitive, wailing accordion, but disc jockey Eddie Shuler liked what he heard and featured him on several broadcasts. "I felt sorry for the kid," admitted Shuler. "He was nearly blind and he had no other way to make money."

The cameo on Shuler's show proved so successful that Lake Charles listeners demanded more French music. A year later, there was as much as eight hours of French broadcasting on KPLC daily. Still, LeJeune needed a new record out to get work at the dances around Lake Charles. He then approached Shuler, who'd already made a record with his group, the Reveliers, and released it on his own Goldband Records label. "He said 'Eddie, I want to make records and I want you to make them,'" said Shuler. "I didn't know anything about making French records. Finally I agreed though because there was nobody around here making French records. Nobody was interested in making them because there was no money in French records. But as it turned out, I had the market to myself."

Bribing the engineer with a bottle of Old Crow, Shuler had LeJeune record "Lacassine Special" and "Calcasieu Waltz" on a disc cutter at the radio station used to record commercials and jingles. He sent the metal masters to Houston where several hundred 78s were pressed on the Folk Star label. Later, he did the same with TNT Records in San Antonio. Selling the release from the trunk of his car to record shops and jukebox outlets, the disc did remarkably well in the area. As a result, Shuler rushed LeJeune back to the station to cut "Teche Special" and "Te Mone." Suddenly, the fiddle was on the way out of Louisiana and the accordion was back in. Accordionists Lawrence Walker, Aldus Roger, Sidney Brown and Nathan Abshire would soon follow with their own records, but they couldn't touch LeJeune in terms of popularity or sales.

LeJeune assembled a crack band, the Lacassine Playboys, which at one time or another featured Crawford Vincent or Robert Bertrand on drums, Alfred "Duckhead" Cormier on guitar, Wilson Granger on fiddle, R. C. Vanicor on steel guitar and even occasionally Shuler on guitar. The Playboys were known for their casual appearance on the bandstand as LeJeune, never further than an arm's length from a cigarette and a cold bottle of Jax, often looked like he'd just arrived from a day of fishing. Attire aside, LeJeune continued to accumulate a phenomenal body of work. Shuler continued to record LeJeune at KPLC and later at LeJeune's home in Calcasieu, LA, setting his tape recorder on the kitchen table. From LeJeune's kitchen came the beautiful "Duraldo Waltz," a song that featured no accordion, but did include a well-timed bark by the LeJeune family's hog dog, Rain. Another classic was "I Made A Big Mistake," a J.D. Miller composition accentuated by LeJeune's bluesy vocals and crying accordion.

== Death ==
Sadly, at the peak of his career, LeJeune was killed at the age of 26. LeJeune and fiddler J. B. Fuselier were returning home after playing at a dance at the Green Wing club in Eunice on October 8, 1955, when tragedy struck. "They were coming home on old Highway 90," recalled Shuler. "They had a flat where they were widening the highway and they couldn't pull off. They were trying to change the tire when a guy came along going about 90 MPH. He hit him (LeJeune) and knocked him into a field. That was the end of Iry."

LeJeune left a wife Wilma, and five children including Eddie LeJeune and Ervin LeJeune, who would follow in their father's musical footsteps.

== Legacy ==
LeJeune's complete body of work consists of fewer than 30 songs. Frustratingly for Cajun listeners, unless you were lucky enough to possess some of his original 78s or 45s, until a few years ago, you couldn't hear LeJeune's undoctored masterpieces. When assembling LeJeune's material for reissue on LP in 1970, Shuler overdubbed an electric bass on all the tracks. This was undone when Ace Records in England assembled Iry LeJeune: Cajun's Greatest — The Definitive Collection using original discs and master tapes as sources.

- Iry LeJeune with the Oklahoma Tornadoes: Love Bridge Waltz
- Iry LeJeune with the Oklahoma Tornadoes: Evangeline Special

Both Love Bridge Waltz and Evangeline Special were inducted into the National Recording Registry in 2009.

== See also ==
- History of Cajun Music
- List of Notable People Related to Cajun Music
