= Joe Hall (accordionist) =

- Born: December 15, 1971; Eunice, Louisiana, U.S.
- Died: November 21, 2024 (aged 52)
- Genres: La la, Cajun, zydeco
- Occupation: musician
- Instruments: accordion, vocals
- Years active: 2006–2024
- Label: Fruge Records
- Formerly of: Joe Hall and the Louisiana Cane Cutters
- Website: https://joehallzydeco.com/

Joe Hall (December 15, 1971 – November 21, 2024) was an American accordionist and vocalist who performed Creole la la, Cajun, and zydeco music.

== Early life ==
Hall was born in Eunice, Louisiana, on December 15, 1971. He spent many of his later years living in Arnaudville.

Hall took an early interest in music from watching his grandfather, Clement "King" Ned play accordion for house dances. In an interview, Hall recalls, "That's where I got the love of playing music from. I would watch my grandfather and listen until finally one day, around the age of 7, I turned to my mama and I said, 'I am gonna do that, too.'" He eventually learned to play accordion from Alphonse "Bois Sec" Ardoin. He is described as an accordion traditionalist, but he also draws from a broad variety of Cajun, Creole, and zydeco repertoires. One 2003 reviewer has described his music this way: "The gravelly-voiced Hall decorates his playing with plenty of syncopated accents, octave notes and rhythmic stops that’s unlike anything in contemporary zydeco or Cajun. Additionally, the arrangements' 'B' parts also deviate from their Cajun counterparts, which stir in a flavoring all its own."

== Music career ==
In 2006, Joe Hall and the Louisiana Cane Cutters formed and recorded La Danse Finit Pas: Classic Louisiana Creole Music. Hall learned some of the songs by listening to archival recordings at the Center for Louisiana Studies at the University of Louisiana at Lafayette. This album also featured accordionists Mary Broussard and Nolton Semien on two tracks, Mitch Reed on fiddle, D’Jalma Garnier on guitar, Gus Ardoin on bass, and Dexter Ardoin on drums.

Other early lineups of the Louisiana Cane Cutters had Dexter Ardoin on bass, Jay Miller on drums, and Kevin Murphy on guitar.

In 2007, Joe Hall and the Louisiana Cane Cutters released Good Times, Good Music.

In 2009, Joe Hall and the Louisiana Cane Cutters released Live at Nunu's, the first live album recorded at the Arnaudville venue.

In 2011, Joe Hall and the Louisiana Cane Cutters released Thirty Dobb Special, which was also a tribute to Hall's grandfather Clement "King" Ned. Reviewer Dan Willging noted, "Hall is a powerful singer and accordionist, and even though the 11 cuts hail from two different studios and three tracks captured live, he makes it feel like a single session."

In 2017, Joe Hall recorded Masse Family Two-Step under the group name Joe Hall and Friends. This group included Forest Huval (fiddle and vocals), Mark Palms (guitar and fiddle), Carol Palms (bass), and Paul Lavan (drums). "Nu Nu's Breakdown" additionally featured Al Berard (fiddle) and Christine Balfa (guitar), and "La Valse de Samedi Midi" featured Hall's own grandfather, Clement "King" Ned (accordion and vocals), recorded in 1965 by Library of Congress folklorist Ralph Rinzler in 1965.

In 2019, Joe Hall and the Louisiana Cane Cutters released Aye Cher Catin ("Hey, dear doll"). This album had the same lineup as Masse Family Two-Step, with the addition of Marshall Baker (fiddle). Reviewer Dan Willging noted that this album was the first recorded in Fruge's Michigan studio, and called the album "the finest yet recorded by the husky-voiced Creole powerhouse accordionist."

In 2021, Joe Hall and the Louisiana Cane Cutters released Proud to be a Creole. Mark Palms and Paul Lavan continued at guitar and drums respectively, while Chuck Bush replaced Carol Palms at bass. Special guests were Cedric Watson (fiddle and frottoir) and Michael Lockett (keyboard).

In 2022, Joe Hall and the Louisiana Cane Cutters released Mélange. Reviewer Daniel Willging noted, "Hall and Watson fit together seamlessly, interlocking into a comfortable, natural groove propelled by drummer Paul Lavan’s whipping beats and Bush’s motoring but unobtrusive bass playing."

The current members of the Louisiana Cane Cutters are: Chuck Bush (bass), "Lil'" Paul Lavan (drums), Mark Palms (guitar), and Cedric Watson (fiddle).

Joe Hall and the Louisiana Cane Cutters are signed to Fruge Records, located in Michigan, and owned by band guitarist Mark Palms.

Hall has appeared at several festivals, such as the New Orleans Jazz & Heritage Festival, Festival International, Festivals Acadiens et Créoles, the Louisiana Cajun-Zydeco Festival, the New York's Swamp in the City Festival, and the French Quarter Festival.

Hall has appeared in two instructional DVDs, Cajun and Creole Accordion Lesson volumes I and II, produced by Fruge Records.

Hall passed away unexpectedly on November 21, 2024, at the age of 52.

== Awards and honors ==
Joe Hall and the Louisiana Cane Cutters have been nominated for the OffBeat Best of the Beat Award in 2021–22 in the category of Best Zydeco Album, for Proud to be a Creole.

== Discography ==
=== Joe Hall and Mitch Reed ===
Album title	Record label	Release year
Joe Hall and Mitch Reed	Independent	2003

=== Albums with the Louisiana Cane Cutters ===
Album title	Record label	Release year
La Danse Finit Pas: Classic Louisiana Creole Music	Fruge	2006
Good Times, Good Music	Fruge	2007
Live at Nunu's	Fruge	2009
Thirty Dobb Special	Fruge	2011
Aye Cher Catin	Fruge	2019
Proud to be a Creole	Fruge	2021
Mélange	Fruge	2022

=== Joe Hall and Friends ===
Album title	Record label	Release year
Masse Family Two-Step	Fruge	2017
