= Dennis McGee =

American musician (1893–1989)

- Dennis McGee on PBS's American Patchwork

Background information
- Born: January 26, 1893
- Origin: Eunice, Louisiana, U.S
- Died: October 3, 1989 (aged 96) Mamou, Louisiana, U.S
- Genres: Cajun
- Occupations: Musician, fiddler, barber
- Instruments: Vocals, fiddle
- Label: Vocalion

Dennis (Denus) McGee (January 26, 1893 – October 3, 1989) was one of the earliest recorded Cajun musicians.

A fiddle player, he recorded and performed with Creole accordionist and vocalist Amédé Ardoin, with accordionist Angelas LeJeune, and with fiddlers Sady Courville (McGee's brother-in-law) and Ernest Frugé. The recordings with Courville and Frugé are among the few surviving examples of Cajun music as it existed before the influence of the accordion became prominent.

McGee's repertoire included not only the waltz and the two-step common to Cajun music but also such dances as the one-step, polka, mazurka, reel, cotillion, the varsovienne, and others.

== Early life ==
Dennis McGee was the son of John McGee Sr. who was of French and Irish ancestry and Amelia, of French and Seminole Indian ancestry. Both sides of his family were Cajun. Amelia died when Dennis was two years old. His first language was French. He received his first violin at the age of 14, and started playing dances within 6 months.

As a young man, McGee met fellow sharecropper Amédé Ardoin. The two started playing music together, soon playing at dancehalls up to five nights per week. They recorded together starting in 1929 in New Orleans, producing some of the earliest recordings of Cajun and Creole music, alongside Joe and Cléoma Falcon, Leo Soileau, Mayeus Lafleur, Douglas Bellard, and Kirby Riley.

== Legacy ==
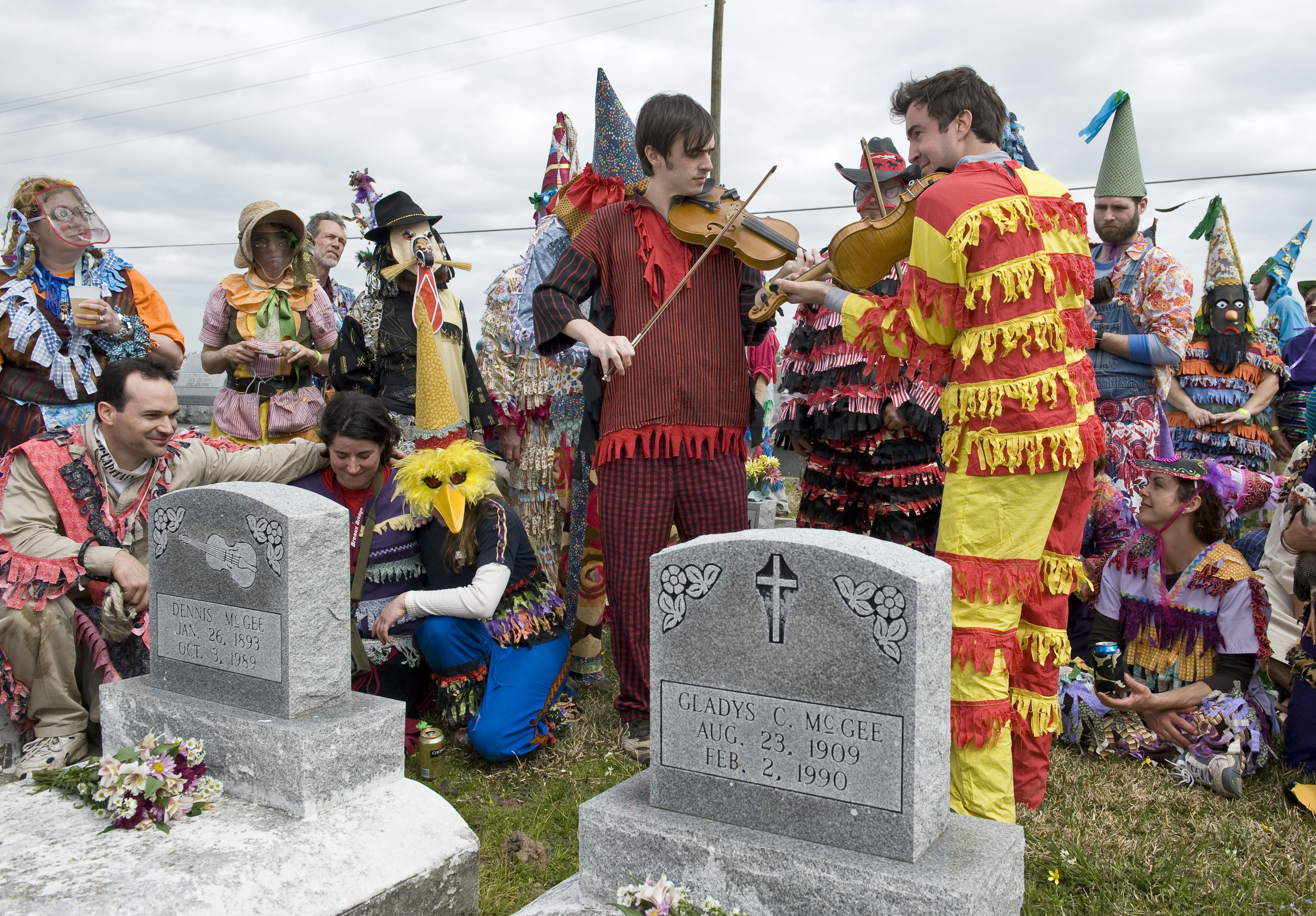
Chris Stafford and Joel Savoy play fiddle at a Courir de Mardi Gras stop by Dennis McGee's grave.

In the 1970s and 80s, McGee continued to perform with Sady Courville at festivals and special concerts and recorded for various American and French labels including Morningstar, Cinq Planetes, Swallow, and Music of the World.

His records are contemporary with Joe and Cléoma Falcon's. Also, his legacy includes his knowledge of playing older styles of Cajun music before the 1900s, when the accordion was introduced.

== Notable recordings ==
- Chère Mama Creole (My Sweet Creole Mama, Vocalion 5319)
- Madame Young, Give Me Your Sweetest (aka Colinda, Vocalion 5319)
- Courville and McGee Waltz (Vocalion 5315)
- Happy One Step (Vocalion 5315)
- Jeunes Gens Compagnard (Jeune Gens de la Campagne, Vocalion 15848)
- Adieu Rosa (Vocalion 15840)

== Discography ==
1929 New Orleans Session with Amédé Ardoin

- "Taunt Aline" / "Two Step de Mama" (40514-F Columbia, 90014 OKeh)
- "Madam Atchen" / "Two Step de Prarie Soileau" (40515-F Columbia, 90015 OKeh)
- "La Valse ah Abe" / "Two Step de Eunice" (40511-F Columbia, 90011 OKeh)

1930 New Orleans Session with Amédé Ardoin

- "Amadie Two Step" / "La Valse A Austin Ardoin" (576 Brunswick, Melotone M18050)
- "Blues de Basille" / "La Valse A Thomas Ardoin" (531 Brunswick)
- "Two Step D'Elton" / "La Valse de Gueydan" (513 Brunswick)
- "Valse des Opelousas" / "One Step Des Chameaux" (559 Brunswick, Melotone 80083)
- "Valse A Alcee Poulard" / "One Step D'Oberlin" (495 Brunswick)

1934 San Antonio Session with Amédé Ardoin

- "Les Blues De Voyage (Travel Blues)" / "La Valse De Amities (Love Waltz)" (B-2189 Bluebird)
- "Les Blues De Crowley (Crowley Blues)" / "Oberlin" (B-2190 Bluebird)
- "Sunset" / "Tout Wue Reste C'Est Mon Linge" (B-2192 Bluebird)

1929 New Orleans Session with Sady Courville

- "Madame Young Donnez Moi Votre Plus Jole Blonde" / "Mon Chere Bebe Creole" (5319 Vocalion)
- "Myself" / "Vous M'Avez Donne Votre Parole" (5348 Vocalion)
- "Allon A Tassone" / "Disez Goodbye A Votre Mere" (5334 Vocalion)
- "Courville And McGee Waltz" / "Happy" (5315 Vocalion)

1929 New Orleans Session with Ernest Fruge

- "Valse Du Puit D'Huile" / "One Step De Mamou" (15846 Vocalion)
- "Valse Du La Penitencier" / "One Step De Chupic" (15851 Vocalion)
- "Valse Des Vachers" / "Jeunes Gens Campagnard" (15848 Vocalion)
- "La Valse Des Reid" / "Adieu Rosa" (15850 Vocalion)

1930 New Orleans First Session with Ernest Fruge

- "La Valse De Lange Au Paille" / "Two Step Du Grand Maraist" (496 Brunswick)

1930 New Orleans Second Session with Ernest Fruge

- "Lanse Des Belaire" / "Les Blues Du Texas" (557 Brunswick)
- "La Valse De Rosalie" / "One Step Des McGee" (590 Brunswick, M18051 Melotone)
- "Valse A Pap" / "Two Step De La Ville Platte" (532 Brunswick)

1930 New Orleans Session with Walter Coquille

- "La Rille Cajen" / "La Danse Carre" (512 Brunswick)

Compilations

- The Traditional Cajun Fiddling Of Dennis McGee & S D Courville (16001 Morning Star, 1972)
- "The Early Recordings of Dennis McGee," by Dennis McGee, featuring Sady Courville and Ernest Fruge (45002 Morning Star, 1977)
- Sady Courville & Dennis McGee: La Vieille Musique Acadienne (LP-6030 Swallow, 1977)
- Cajun Home Music (FA 2620 Folkways Records, 1977)
- The Complete Early Recordings Of Dennis McGee (1929-1930) (YAZ2012 Yazoo, 1994)
- La Vieille Musique Acadienne by Sady Courville & Dennis McGee (SW3001 Swallow, 2003)
- Dennis McGee & Sady Courville (FRC308 Field Recorders' Collective, 2007)
- Himself by Dennis Mcgee (VAL-CD-0011 Valcour, 2010)

== Family ==
McGee had three wives: Nita Rozas (1910–1911), Marie Young (after 1912), and Gladys Courville (1925). He stayed married to his final wife until she died in 1990. One of his sons, Gerry McGee, was a member of The Ventures. Gerry McGee went to Hollywood, California, and recorded with numerous rock and pop stars, such as Elvis Presley "Girls, Girls, Girls"and "Trouble With Girls", Movie Soundtrack "Great Balls of Fire", and Rock Sensation, Ivy Lite Rocway and Country Superstar, Dwight Yoakam.

== See also ==
- History of Cajun Music
- List of Notable People Related to Cajun Music
