= Camey Doucet =

Cajun musician and disc jockey

Camey Joseph Doucet
- Also known as: The Cajun Gentlemen
- Born: April 4, 1939 (age 87); Crowley, Louisiana, U.S
- Genre: Cajun
- Occupations: Disc jockey, Musician
- Label: Swallow Records

Camey Joseph Doucet is a Cajun musician and disc jockey. Doucet has been twice honored by the Cajun French Music Association being inducted into the hall of fame in its inaugural year in 1997 and awarded for Continuing Contribution to Cajun Music in 2004.

== Biography ==
Camey was born April 4, 1939, in Crowley, Louisiana. He is the son of Julian and Louisa Doucet. Camey married Deanna Brasseaux in 1959 and they have two children, Mark and Nancy.

Camey served for two years in the U.S. Army, and worked as a policeman in Crowley for three years.

He started in radio by lending amplifiers and speakers to AM 1560 KAJN radio. Camey was asked to apply for a job as a sales person. After two months he was given a Saturday afternoon French program, which he did for three and a half years.

"Born a musician", his mother said," He was trying to sing before he could talk". He recorded his first record while working at KAJN. Then Camey went KSIG for 11 years and then worked at KLVI in Beaumont, Texas, and then back again to KSIG. Later Camey was employed at KROF Radio in Abbeville, Louisiana, where he has been for 11 years as of August 1997.

Camey has recorded several 45s, five albums and one CD. He has done some French gospel songs and has composed some new and different songs which have been popular, such as "Who stole the Pies." Probably Camey's best known song which touched the many hearts is "Mom, I'm Still Your Little Boy".

== Je Suis Toujours Ton 'tit Garçon ==
In 1976, Camey Doucet released the song Je Suis Toujors Ton 'tit Garçon, which translates to I'm Always Your Little Boy. On the other side of the record was Hold My False Teeth. This record was released on the Swallow Records label. Je Suis Toujors Ton 'tit Garçon is among his most popular songs. The song is an ode to the singer's mother. However, Doucet's mother never heard the song.

== Discography ==
Mom I'm Still your little boy (Swallow 10251) 1976

== See also ==
- History of Cajun Music
- List of people related to Cajun music
