= Canray Fontenot =

American Creole fiddler

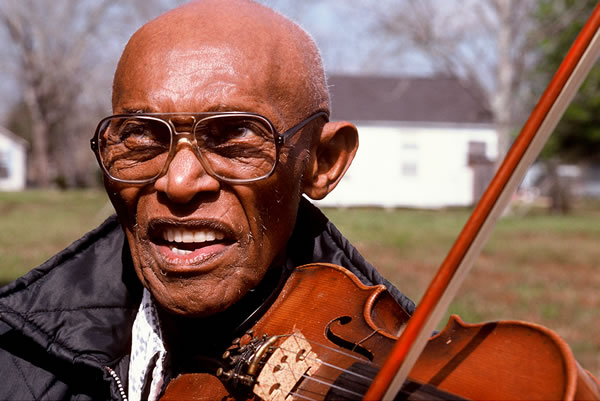
- Fontenot in 1986

Background information
- Born: October 16, 1922; L'Anse aux Vaches, Evangeline Parish, Louisiana, U.S.
- Died: July 29, 1995 (aged 72); Welsh, Louisiana, U.S.
- Genres: Creole; Cajun
- Instrument: Fiddle
- Labels: Arhoolie, Melodeon, Rounder, Sonet

Canray Fontenot (October 16,^{[a]} 1922 – July 29, 1995) was an American Creole fiddle player, who has been described as "the greatest Creole Louisiana French fiddler of our time."

== Early life ==
Canray Fontenot was born in L'Anse aux Vaches, near Basile, Louisiana; his family was from nearby Duralde. Fontenot, who grew up working on a family farm, inherited his musical skills from his parents, who played accordion; his father Adam, known as "Nonc Adam", played with Amédé Ardoin. Canray first played a cigar-box fiddle that had strings taken off the screen door of his home. His bow was made from the branches of pear trees and sewing thread.

Canray stated: "So, we took some cigar boxes... In those days, cigar boxes were made of wood. So, we worked at it and finally made ourselves a fiddle. For our strings, we had no real strings ... we took strands off the screen door. We made fiddles out of that stuff, and then we started practicing." He visited a neighbor "to see how he tuned his fiddle. He would sound a string, and then I would try mine, but I couldn't go as high as his fiddle; every time I tried to match his pitch, I'd break a string.... But then when he would break a string, I would take the longest end. Then my fiddle sounded pretty good. And that's how I learned. It's just a matter of having music on your mind."

== Music career ==
Fontenot and Bois Sec playing at the Newport Folk Festival in 1966

By 1934, Fontenot had begun performing with Amédé Ardoin, who wanted him to play on a recording session with him in New York; however, his parents would not allow him to travel. In the late 1930s, he formed a string band with George Lenard and Paul Frank, playing boogie woogie, western swing and jazz as well as traditional tunes, but after a few years Fontenot established a more lasting partnership with accordionist Alphonse "Bois Sec" Ardoin (a cousin of Amédé) from nearby Duralde. In 1948 the pair formed the Duralde Ramblers, who became highly popular in south west Louisiana and made many radio broadcasts through the 1950s, notably on KEUN in Eunice. He also began writing songs. His most well-known original songs are "Joe Pitre a Deux Femmes", "Les Barres de la Prison", and "Bonsoir Moreau", which have become standards in the Cajun and Zydeco music repertoires. Fontenot was never a professional musician; he was a rice farmer for many years, and also worked as a labourer in a feed store in the town of Welsh.

Fontenot and Ardoin made their debut outside of Louisiana in 1966, performing at the Newport Folk Festival. At the time, Fontenot had not performed in public for several years, but was persuaded to do so by folklorist Ralph Rinzler. Following the festival, the pair recorded an album with producer Dick Spottswood, Les Blues Du Bayou, and from then on started appearing in a steady stream of festivals in Louisiana and around the world, becoming the last Creole musicians playing music in the "old style".

In 1986, Fontenot and Ardoin were both awarded National Heritage Fellowships by the National Endowment for the Arts, which is the United States government's highest honor in the folk and traditional arts. Also in 1986, he and Ardoin were appointed adjunct professors at the University of Southwestern Louisiana. In later years he was featured in many documentaries on Cajun and Creole culture, including the 1989 film J'ai Ete au Bal as well as PBS's American Patchwork Don't Drop the Potato. He also performed in New Orleans and toured Europe with the band Filé. There is a portrait of Canray in Yasha Aginsky's 1983 film Cajun Visits, and in Jean-Pierre Bruneau's 1993 film Louisiana Blues, edited by Yasha Aginsky.

Canray Fontenot died in 1995 at his home in Welsh, Louisiana, from cancer.

== Personal life ==
Fontenot was Catholic.

== Legacy ==
The New Orleans culture magazine OffBeat Magazine has compared Fontenot to contemporary artist Jourdan Thibodeaux, who also performs music of the "Cajun French" style. Mark DeWitt, an expert of Louisiana's traditional music styles has noted that modern zydeco style has moved away from the fiddle to emphasize the accordion. Zydeco DJ James "J.B." Adams has noted that most of the Creole fiddlers have died: "When Canray passed, it’s like it’s gone. It’s almost like a lost art."

== Recordings ==
Fontenot's music can be found on Arhoolie Records, CD 381, Canray Fontenot: Louisiana Hot Sauce, Creole Style, 1993; also on Arhoolie Records, Les Blues de Bayou, 1970; and also on Arhoolie Records, La Musique Creole, 1983.

- "Les Blues du Voyageur" Canray Fontenot & Alphonse 'Bois-Sec' Ardoin Listen (MP3)
- "Jolie Bassette" Canray Fontenot & Alphonse 'Bois-Sec' Ardoin Listen (MP3)

== See also ==
- History of Cajun Music
- List of Notable People Related to Cajun Music

== Notes ==
a. Some sources say the 23rd
