= Austin Pitre =

American musician (1918–1981)

- Austin Pitre

Background information
- Born: Austin Pitre; February 23, 1918
- Origin: Ville Platte, Louisiana
- Died: April 8, 1981 (aged 63)
- Genres: Cajun
- Occupations: Musician, Accordionist
- Instrument: Cajun accordion
- Labels: Feature Records, Arhoolie Records, Swallow Records

Austin Pitre (February 23, 1918 - April 8, 1981) was an American musician. A Cajun music pioneer, Pitre claimed to be the first musician to play the accordion standing up, rather than sitting down. Along with his band, the Evangeline Playboys, Pitre recorded Cajun dancehall hits such as the "Opelousas Waltz."

== Family ==
Pitre was born in Ville Platte, Louisiana to father Joseph Vige Pitre and mother Marie Fontenot. His older brother, Jean Baptiste "Curley" Pitre (June 14, 1906 - December 29, 1978) was a farmer who lived in the Prairie Ronde area. Austin first married Joyce Vidrine from Bayou Chicot, with whom he had the following sons: Aurelie Joseph Pitre, Sr., Harris Pitre, Sr., and Albert Pitre. After divorcing Joyce, Austin married Dorothy Lou Rider from Eunice. They had the following children: James Pitre, Rena, and Mary Pitre. Austin had another son, Austin Ray Pitre, whose mother was Louvine Fontenot.

== Music and career ==
Pitre was the front man for Austin Pitre & the Evangeline Playboys for many years and played dance halls around the South Louisiana area. His unique style of playing included standing up to play the accordion without the aid of a shoulder strap, as well as playing the accordion behind his head and between his legs. Besides being a talented musician, Pitre was also a highly regarded mechanic and had his own automotive repair shop near Ville Platte, Louisiana.

== Death and legacy ==
Pitre died on April 8, 1981, at the age of 63. He is buried in the Mount Calvary Cemetery on Highway 190 east of Eunice, Louisiana.

In 1997, Pitre was posthumously inducted into the Cajun French Music Association's Hall of Fame. That same year, Arhoolie released the CD Austin Pitre & His Evangeline Playboys - Opelousas Waltz, which was a remaster of recordings that Pitre had made in 1971.

Pitre's last wife, Dorothy, died March 14, 2014, and is buried next to him in Mount Calvary Cemetery. She was active in preserving his legacy as well as Cajun music in general. She was a disc jockey for KEUN for many years, hosted the weekly Rendezvous des Cajuns at the Liberty Theater in Eunice, Louisiana, and also worked at the Cajun Music Hall of Fame and Museum in Eunice where Austin Pitre's Monarch accordion can be seen.

== Discography ==
- "Chatatinia Waltz" / "Evangeline Playboys Special" (F-1013 Feature Records, 1948) (45-10184, LP 6009 Swallow Records)
- "High Point Two Step" / "Redell Waltz" (F-1019 Feature Records, 1948)
- "Manuel Bar Waltz" / "Midway Two-Step" (BM 101, CDCHD 783 Big Mamou Records, 1957). Associated with Milton Molitor.
- "Opelousas Waltz" / "Flum De Faire (Flames Of Hell)" (45-106, LP 6001, CDCHD 783 Swallow Records, 1959)
- "Rainbow Waltz" / "Rene's Special (inst.)" (45-108, CDCHD 783 Swallow Records, 1960)
- "Two Step de Bayou Teche" / "Chinaball Blues" (45-114, LP 6001 Swallow Records, 1960)
- "Two Step A Tante Adele" / "Mamou Blues" (45-117 Swallow Records, 1961)
- "J'ai Coiner A Ta Porte" / "La Valse D'Amour" (45-118 Swallow Records)
- "Don't Shake My Tree" / "Jungle Club Waltz" (45-10146, CH 141 Swallow Records, 1963)
- "New Oakdale Waltz" / "Lakeview Special" (45-10171, CH 141 Swallow Records)
- "La Pauvre Hobo" / "Pretty Rosie Cheeks" (45-10121, Swallow Records)

Compilations

- Cajun Folk Music: Southern Journey 15 (25015 Prestige/International, 1956–1959)
- Folksongs Of The Louisiana Acadians Vol. 2, Various Artists (LP5015 Arhoolie, 1956–1959)
- Back To The Bayou, Austin Pitre and The Evangeline Playboys (SNTF 815 Sonet Records (England), 1979)
- Austin Pitre & The Evangeline Playboys (LP-6041 Swallow Records, 1981)
- The Swallow Recordings, D. L. Menard / Austin Pitre (CDCHD 327 Ace Records, 1991)
- Opelousas Waltz, Austin Pitre And The Evangeline Playboys (CD 452 Arhoolie Records, 1997)
- The Essential Early Cajun Recordings of Austin Pitre And The Evangeline Playboys, (SW6211 Swallow Records, 1999)

== See also ==
- List of people related to Cajun music
- History of Cajun Music
