= Julius Lamperez =

Julius "Papa Cairo" Lamperez
- Papa Cairo with Harry Choates

Background information
- Birth name: Julius Angelle Lamperez
- Also known as: Papa Cairo
- Born: July 27, 1920; New Orleans, Louisiana
- Died: November 13, 1999 (aged 79); Crowley, Louisiana
- Genres: Cajun, country
- Occupation(s): Musician, vocalist
- Instrument: Lap steel guitar
- Labels: Decca, Bluebird, Feature Records, B&C Records

Julius Angelle "Papa Cairo" Lamperez (born July 27, 1920 New Orleans, Louisiana – d. November 13, 1999 Crowley, Louisiana) was a popular guitarist, steel guitarist and country string band artist in Louisiana and southeast Texas during the 1930s through the 1950s. He would later be known as the first person to write the tune "Grand Texas" which would later be popularized by Moon Mullican and Hank Williams as the song Jambalaya.

== Biography ==
Julius "Papa Cairo" Lamperez playing guitar, 1938

Lamperez was born in New Orleans but raised in Crowley. By 1932, at age of 12, he learned to read music and play the fiddle and became good friends with Joe Falcon and Cleoma Breaux. He married Bessie Short. In 1934, he formed the Daylight Creepers band along with guitarist Bill Redlich and fiddler Erby Thibodeaux. Their music was broadcast on KVOL. When not playing music, he played football and loved boxing.

He disbanded the group and in 1937, he joined Joe Werner and the Louisiana Rounders playing guitar and singing. They recorded 12 songs in Dallas in 1937 for Decca Records including "Allons Kooche Kooche", a tune based on the Jolly Boys of Lafayette's "Abbeville". The melody would have a huge impact on his later recording of "Grand Texas". While in the band, he would meet Horace Andrus "Uncle Ambrose" Thibodeaux, Leroy "Happy Fats" Leblanc, Oran Guidry and Harry Choates. Happy Fats noticed he always wore a diamond-shaped gem on his tie and finger. Using the Cajun French word for "diamond" ("karo", pronounced "cairo"), his nickname became "Papa Cairo". He played the guitar across his knees with a metal finger attachment. By December 1937, Lamperez would be back in Dallas, this time with Leo Soileau's Rhythm Boys and in 1938, he recorded again with Joe in New Orleans.

By 1941, Lamperez learned to play a Hawaiian-style lap steel guitar and traveled with Happy Fats to Dallas to record for Bluebird Records. During the session, he wrote the song "In The House at the End of the Road". However, soon after, he was drafted into the US Army, became a Sergeant, and fought in Europe during World War II. He was captured by the Germans and held prisoner of war in a stalag. He escaped four times but never got very far, however, he made a fiddle while captured and the guards enjoyed his music.

After the war, he began playing music again touring with Ernest Tubb. In 1946, he played with Harry Choates and his Melody Boys. He would also fill in from time to time with bands such as the Louisiana Hillbillies

In 1948, he travelled with Chuck Guillory & his Rhythm Boys to New Orleans, wrote, and recorded the tune "Grand Texas" for Modern Records. In 1949, he would form his own band called "Papa Cairo And His Boys", including fiddler Rufus Thibodeaux. That year, he would record a second version of his hit song in English called "Big Texas #2" and re-record "Kooche Kooche" in French. In 1951, he would record his own version of the song entitled "Big Texas" for J. D. "Jay" Miller's Feature label. Jealous of Hank Williams' success with "Jamabalaya" in 1952, he claimed the song was stolen from his "Grand Texas" melody and refused to record again. He continued to play around Galveston, Texas.

Another one of his songs, "Just Wait And See", would be the basis for Marty Robbins' song "Pretty Words". At some point, he also recorded "Why Not" and "Smiling Pines" for B & C Records.

== Discography ==
=== Compilations ===
- Swingbillies – Hillbilly & Western Swing on Modern/Colonial/Flair 1947–52 (CHD 893 Ace, 2004)
