= Alphonse "Bois Sec" Ardoin =

American Creole accordionist

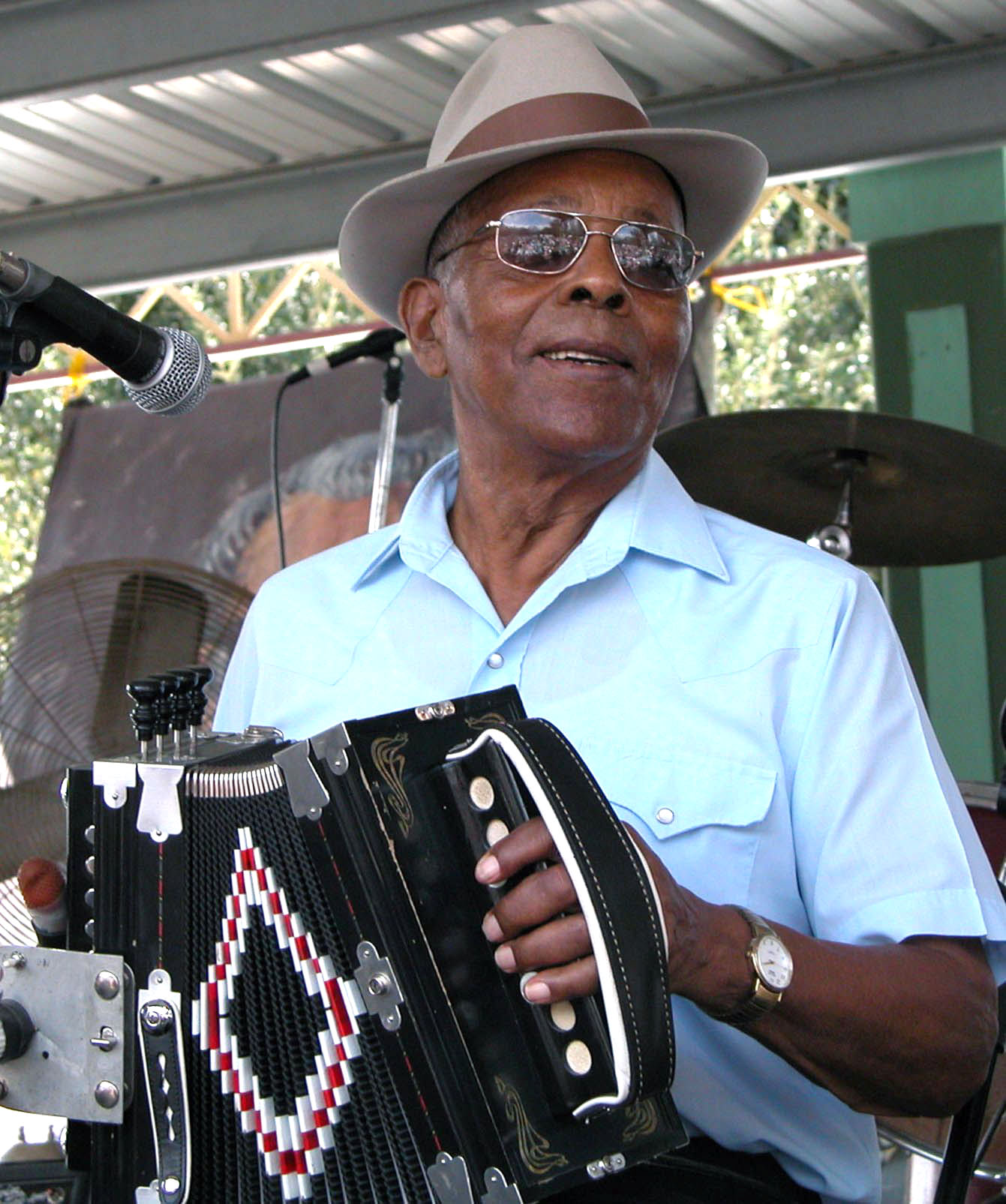
- Ardoin playing at the 2002 Festivals Acadiens in Lafayette, Louisiana

Background information
- Born: November 16, 1915; Duralde, Evangeline Parish, Louisiana, U.S.
- Died: May 16, 2007 (aged 91) Eunice, Louisiana, U.S.
- Genres: Creole
- Occupations: Musician, accordionist, singer
- Instruments: Vocals, cajun accordion

Alphonse "Bois Sec" Ardoin (November 16, 1915 – May 16, 2007) was a Creole accordionist who specialized in the Creole music called "la la music" or "la musique Creole" (closely related to Cajun music) and was influential in what became zydeco music.

== Early life ==
Ardoin was born in the unincorporated rural village of Duralde in Evangeline Parish, Louisiana, to Gustave and Mary Louise (Caesar) Ardoin. His father owned a guitar but was not a musician, nor was his mother. His father died of pneumonia when Alphonse was four years old. To earn money after Gustave's death, his mother took in laundry from white people and his older brother hired himself out to help support the family.

Ardoin earned his nickname meaning "dry wood" because he would always be the first to run in from the fields during a rainstorm. After starting on the triangle with his cousin Amédé Ardoin and fiddler Dennis McGee, he learned traditional accordion at age 12, playing the style of Louisiana music that was a precursor to zydeco. Through his teenage years, Bois Sec played triangle in Amédé's band at a club in Basile and at numerous house parties throughout the region.

== Musical groups ==
His longtime musical partner was Canray Fontenot. By 1948, they were playing together in the Duralde Ramblers, and performed on local radio stations and in clubs. In 1966, they were invited to perform at the Newport Jazz Festival, where they received an enthusiastic reception. In the same year, they recorded their first album, Les Blues Du Bayou, on the Melodeon label.

In the early 1970s, Bois Sec formed the Ardoin Family Orchestra (sometimes also known as the Ardoin Brothers Band or the Ardoin Family Band) with three of his sons and Canray Fontenot. The popular band played at many folk festivals, made a number of recordings, and appeared in two films, Dry Wood (1973) and J'ai Été Au Bal (1989). Ardoin retired from playing music after the death of his son Gustave "Bud" in a car accident in 1974, but returned a few years later. After Fontenot's death in 1995, Ardoin performed with Christine Balfa, Dirk Powel and their band Balfa Toujours, recording an album, Allons Danser, with them in 1998.

== Personal life ==
Bois Sec and his wife Marceline had 14 children, who were raised on the family farm in Duralde. The couple were considered community leaders.

Bois Sec's oldest son Morris played accordion with the family band for many years but left to open and operate Club Morris, a dance hall and bar near his father's home. The club is considered the focal point for the social life of the Creole community in Duralde. Son Lawrence "Black" Ardoin is also a musician who played in the family band, but left in the early 1980s to form his own group called French Zydeco Band.

Three of Bois Sec's grandchildren (Dexter, Sean, and Chris) are also musicians.

== Death ==
On May 16, 2007, Bois Sec died at the age of 91 of natural causes in a nursing home in Eunice, Louisiana. He was funeralized at St Anthony Catholic Church.

== Selected discography ==
- La Musique Creole
- Allons Danser
- Les Blues De Bayou

== Awards ==
In 1986, Ardoin and Fontenot were both awarded National Heritage Fellowships by the National Endowment for the Arts, which is the United States government's highest honor in the folk and traditional arts.

== See also ==
- History of Cajun Music
- List of Notable People Related to Cajun Music
