= Balfa =

Balfa is a surname. Notable people with that name include:

- Christine Balfa (born 1968), Cajun musician
- Dewey Balfa (1927=1992), American Cajun fiddler and singer
- The Balfa Brothers, a Cajun musical ensemble which included Dewey and others

== See also ==
- M. Balfas (1922-1975), Indonesian writer and literary critic
