= Sady Courville =

American musician (1905–1988)

- Dennis McGee and Courville playing fiddle with Marc Savoy in 1976

Background information
- Birth name: Sady Courville
- Born: November 15, 1905; Chataignier, Louisiana, U.S.
- Died: January 3, 1988 (aged 82); Eunice, Louisiana, U.S.
- Genres: Cajun
- Occupation(s): Musician, fiddler
- Instrument: Fiddle
- Labels: Vocalion, Morning Star

Sady D. Courville (November 15, 1905 – January 3, 1988), was a Cajun fiddler noted for his extensive collaboration with Dennis McGee.

== Early life ==
Courville was born in Chataignier, Louisiana, the son of Eraste Courville who was also a fiddler. In his early teens he bought his first fiddle and started learning from his father and Dennis McGee. By the time he was 16, he was playing dances with Amédé Ardoin around Chataignier and Faiquitaigue.

== Musical career ==
In 1929, Courville and McGee were invited to record in New Orleans. Courville was credited only as "second fiddle" on this record, but these eight tracks nevertheless "became the standard for Cajun duet fiddling." Around this time, Courville also recorded with Ernest Fruge.

In 1972, after a recording break of decades, Courville recorded with McGee again, this time on the Morning Star label.

== Personal life ==
Courville married in June 1929. He decided to take a hiatus from music around this time due to the stress.

Courville died on January 3, 1988 in Eunice, Louisiana.

== Discography ==
- Vieille Musique Acadienne (1977) Swallow LP 6030, 3001
- The Complete Early Recordings of Dennis McGee (1929–1930) Yazoo 2012
