= Belton Richard =

American musician

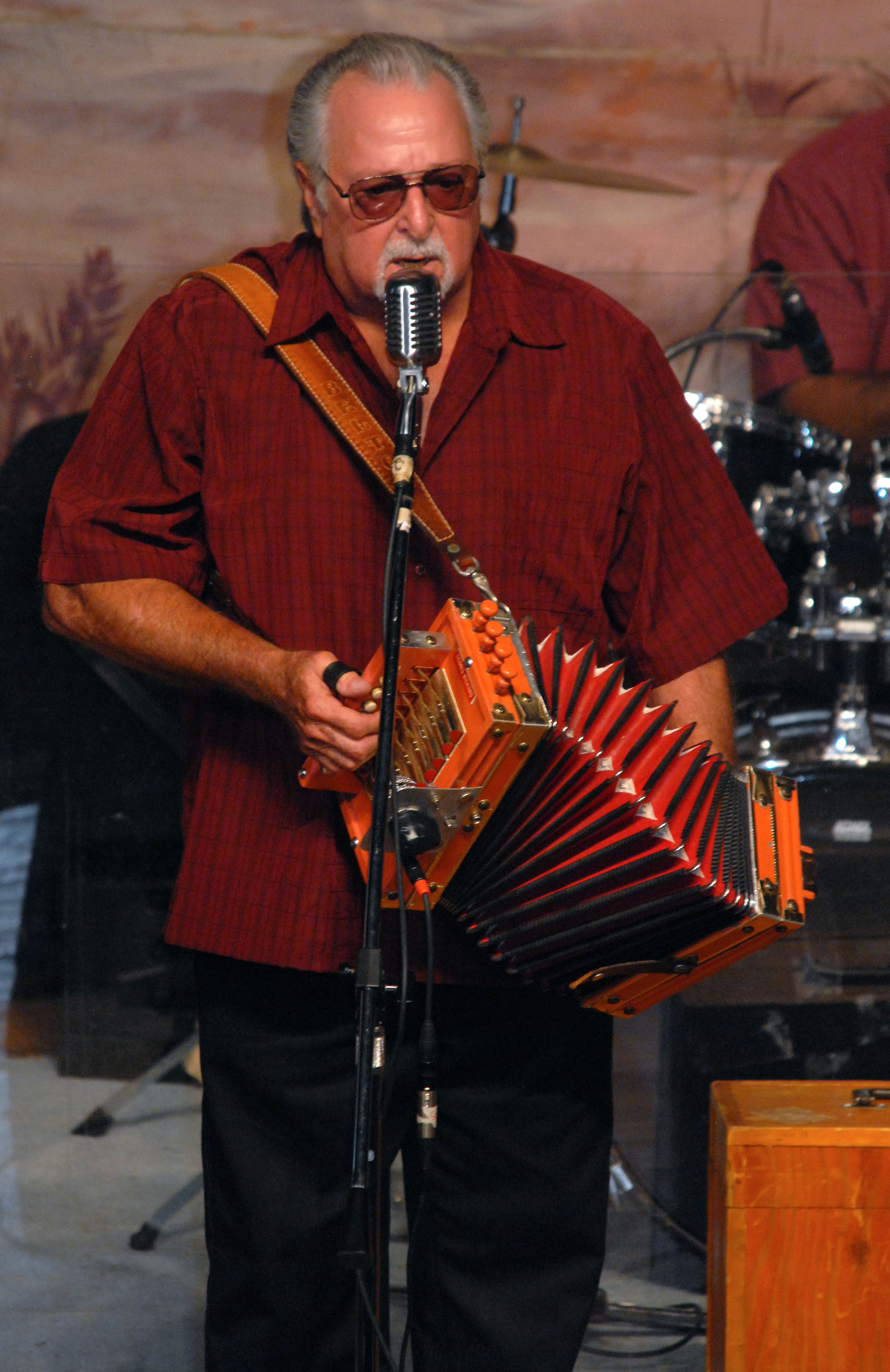

Background information
- Born: October 5, 1939; Rayne, Louisiana, U.S.
- Died: June 21, 2017 (aged 77)
- Genres: Cajun, swamp pop
- Instrument: Cajun accordion
- Label: Swallow Records
- Formerly of: The Musical Aces

Belton Richard (October 5, 1939 – June 21, 2017) was an American Cajun accordionist and vocalist known for his baritone vocal range.

== Biography ==
Richard was born in Rayne, Louisiana, in 1939. He began to play the accordion when he was seven, and at 12 he started playing with Neg Halloway and the Rayne Playboys. He founded The Musical Aces in 1959 after a stint playing rock and roll and swamp pop. During his career he released many popular songs, including "Un Autre Soir Ennuyant", "Pardon Waltz", and "Waltz of No Return". Another notable song is "Cajun Streak", a translation of Ray Stevens' novelty hit "The Streak". He died on June 21, 2017, at the age of 77, after being hospitalized with pneumonia.

== Legacy ==
The 1995 Festivals Acadiens et Créoles was dedicated to Richard. Richard was inducted into the Cajun French Music Association's Hall of Fame in 1997, its inaugural year. In 2003, he was inducted into the Acadian museum's 'Living Legends' list. He also won the Cajun French Music Association's 'Male Vocalist of the Year' in 2004.

== Discography ==
- I'm back (1995)
- The Older The Wine, The Finer The Taste (2003)
