= Christine Balfa =

Cajun musician, born 1968

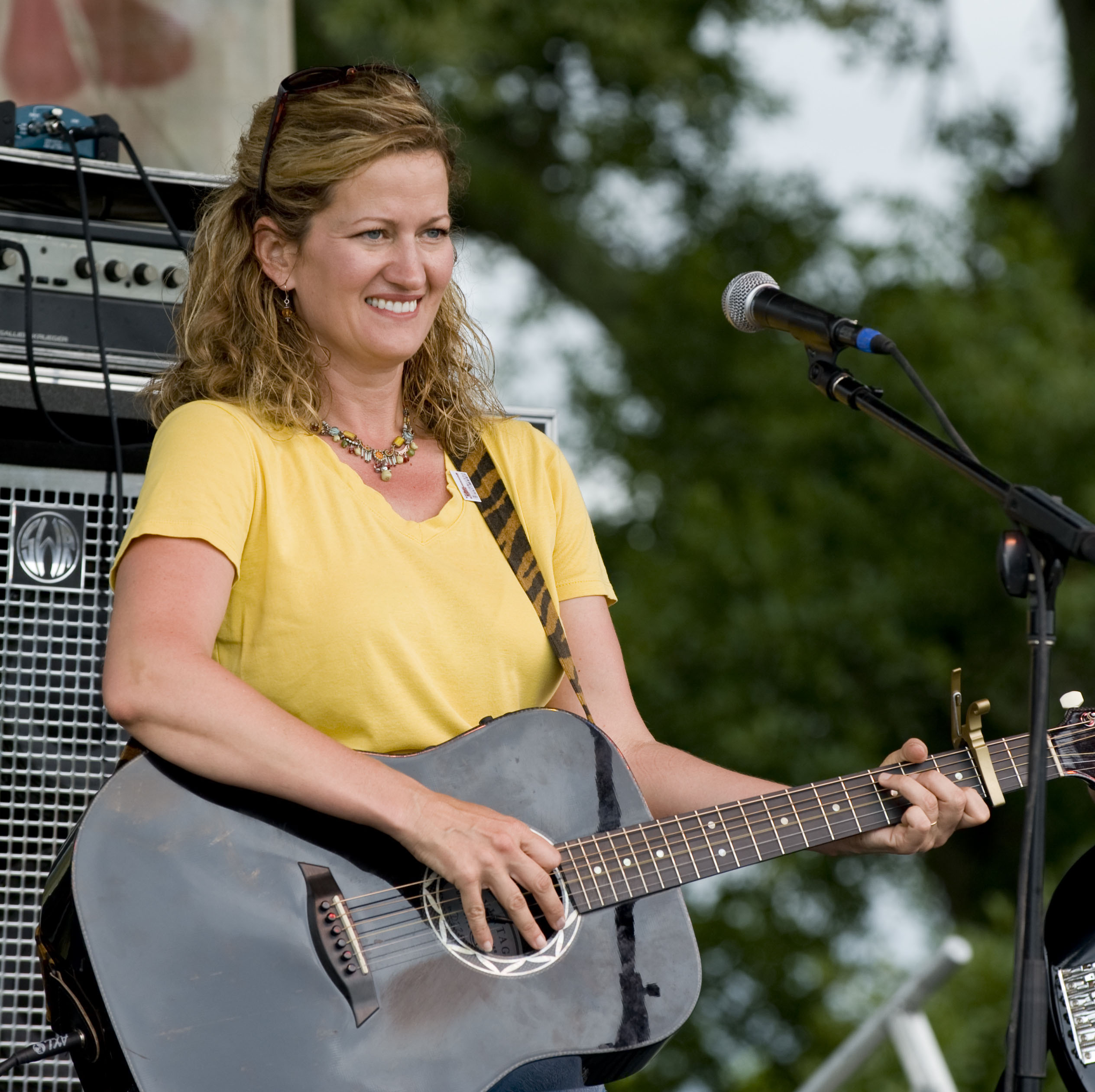
- Balfa playing the guitar at the 2009 Breaux Bridge Crawfish Festival

Background information
- Born: June 28, 1968 (age 58); Basile, Louisiana; United States
- Genres: Cajun
- Occupation: Musician
- Instruments: Guitar, vocals, triangle
- Labels: Valcour, Rounder, Swallow
- Member of: Bonsoir Catin, Balfa Toujours
- Website: www.christinebalfa.com

Christine Balfa is a Cajun musician and founder of the group Balfa Toujours known for performing vocals, guitar, and the triangle. She is the youngest daughter of Dewey Balfa.

Balfa created the Cajun band Balfa Toujours in 1992; and her husband, Dirk Powell, was a long time member of the group.

Christine Balfa is a founding member of the Cajun band Bonsoir Catin, started along with the musicians Kristi Guillory and Yvette Landry in 2005. Bonsoir Catin was nominated for a Best Regional Roots Album Grammy in 2014.

== Biography ==
Balfa was born on June 28, 1968. Her father, the Cajun musician Dewey Balfa, gave her a triangle to play when she was still a toddler. Throughout childhood, Balfa spent time playing music along with The Balfa Brothers in the family home near Basile, Louisiana.

She is the founder of the nonprofit organization Louisiana Folk Roots which has a mission to preserve and promote Cajun and Creole culture. Balfa has taught classes at Acadiana Symphony Orchestra's Conservatory of Music.

In 1998, as Balfa Tourjours, Balfa recorded the album Allons Danser with the Creole musician Alphonse "Bois Sec" Ardoin.

== Discography ==
- Christine Balfa Plays the Triangle (2006, Valcour Records CD 0006)

=== With Balfa Toujours ===
- Pop tu me parles toujours (1993, Swallow Records 6110)
- À vieille Terre Haute (1994, Swallow Records 3121)
- New Cajun Tradition (1995, Ace Records (United Kingdom) CDCHD 613)
- Deux Voyages (1996, Rounder Records CD 6071)
- Allons danser – Bois Sec Ardoin with Balfa Toujours (1998, Rounder Records CD 6081)
- La Pointe (1998, Rounder Records CD 6086)
- Live at Whiskey River Landing (2000, Rounder Records CD 6096)

==== Compilations (partial list) ====
- Alligator Stomp, Vol. 5: Cajun & Zydeco - The Next Generation (1995, Rhino Records R2 71846)
- Bayou Hot Sauce (1997, EasyDisc (Rounder Records) ED CD 7044)
- Cajun Music: The Essential Collection (2002, Rounder Records 1166-11604-2)
- Best of Festivals Acadiens et Créoles 2002 (2011, Festivals Acadiens et Créoles/Valcour Records 0017)

=== With Bonsoir Catin ===
- Blues à Catin (2006, Bridgetown Records 687066539929/CD Baby)
- Vive L'Amour (2009, Valcour Records CD 0007)
- Light the Stars (2014, Valcour Records CD 0023)
- L'Aurore (2017, Valcour Records CD 0037)

==== Compilations (partial list) ====
- The Rough Guide To Cajun & Zydeco (2011, World Music Network/Music Rough Guides RGNET1265CD)
- En Français - Cajun 'N' Creole Rock 'N' Roll (2011, Bayou Teche Brewing)
- Best of Festivals Acadiens et Créoles 2002 (2011, Valcour Records)
- The Best of Valcour Records: Volume I, 2006-2011 (2012, Bayou Teche Brewing/Valcour Records CD 0018)
- The Balfa Family: A Retrospective - Festivals Acadiens et Créoles 1977-2010 (2012, Valcour Records)

== Bibliography ==
- Site of Balfa Toujours

== See also ==
- List of Cajun musicians
