= D. L. Menard =

American Cajun musician and songwriter

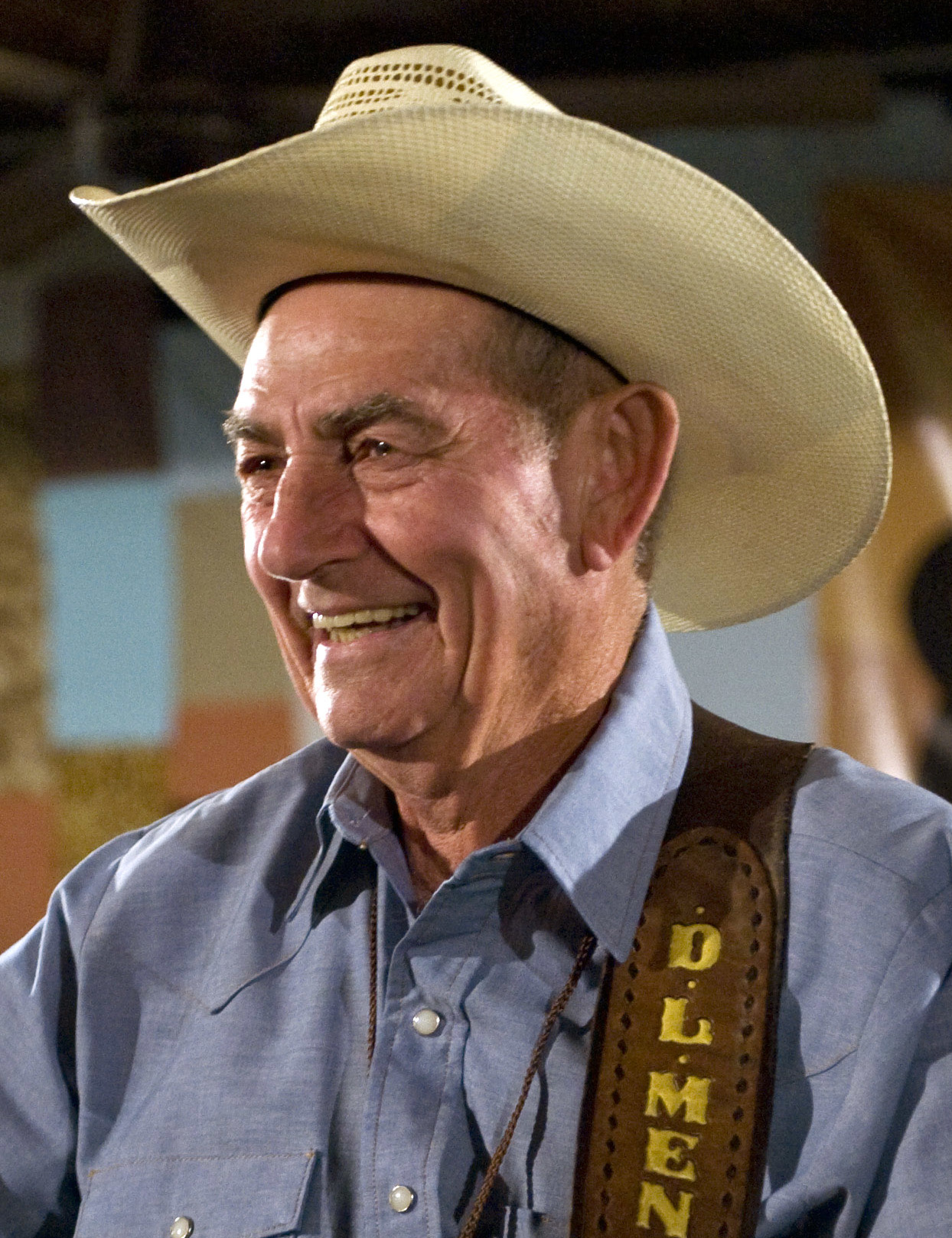
- Menard at the 2008 Black Pot Festival

Background information
- Born: Doris Leon Menard; April 14, 1932; Erath, Louisiana, U.S.
- Died: July 27, 2017 (aged 85) Scott, Louisiana, U.S.
- Genres: Cajun
- Instrument: Guitar
- Labels: Swallow, Rounder, Arhoolie

Doris Leon Menard (April 14, 1932 – July 27, 2017) was an American songwriter, performer, and recording artist in contemporary Cajun music. He was called the "Cajun Hank Williams".

== Biography ==
Menard was born in Erath, Louisiana, and was the only child of Ophy and Helena Primeaux Menard. He was part of a Cajun farming family. He took up the guitar at age 16 and started playing dances in Louisiana clubs at 17. He was strongly influenced by Hank Williams, whom he met in 1951 at the Teche Club shortly before Williams's death. Throughout his career, Menard held performances in more than 30 countries and served as a good-will ambassador for Cajun culture. He had also recorded with non-Cajun artists, including Bryan Ferry.

Menard, and his late wife Louella, had seven children, leading to 17 grandchildren, and 27 great-grandchildren. He died at age 85 on July 27, 2017, in Scott, Louisiana. He had maintained a separate career as a craftsman, noted for his handmade ash-wood chairs.

== Style ==
Menard was known for his "tinny" voice and popular guitar strumming style. Musician and historian Ann Savoy generalizes Cajun guitar strumming to two styles: Old Time Style (Cléoma Falcon) and D. L. Menard Style. It uses bass runs on chord changes and incorporates up-strokes along with down-strokes. He modeled his strumming style after David Bromberg, whom he met in 1973.

== "La Porte En Arrière" ==
Menard was best known for the song "La Porte En Arrière" ("The Back Door"), which he both composed and regularly performed. Cajun folklorist Barry Jean Ancelet has called this the most played and recorded Cajun song ever, selling over 500,000 copies in 1962 alone. It has been covered by dozens of Cajun and zydeco bands and by other francophone artists such as Kate & Anna McGarrigle. Menard said he modeled it on Hank Williams's "Honky Tonk Blues", and that he composed it in less than an hour while working at a gas station in Erath.

== Awards ==
In 1993, his album Le Trio Cadien was nominated for a Grammy Award in the Best Traditional Folk Album category. In 1994, he was a recipient of a National Heritage Fellowship from the National Endowment for the Arts, which is the highest honor in the folk and traditional arts bestowed by the United States government. In 2009, he was inducted into the Louisiana Music Hall of Fame along with Jo-El Sonnier, Doug Kershaw, and Jimmy C. Newman. In 2010, his album Happy Go Lucky was nominated for a Grammy Award in the Best Zydeco or Cajun Music Album category.

== Discography ==
=== Singles ===
- "She Didn't Know I Was Married" / "Bachelor's Life" Swallow 45-10139
- "The Back Door" / "I Can't Forget You" Swallow 45-10131
- "Valse De Jolly Rogers" / "La. Aces Special" Swallow 45-10121
- "Rebecca Ann" / "I Can Live A Better Life" Swallow 45-10147
- "Too Late You're Divorced" / "Riches Of A Musician" Swallow 45-10243
- "The Vail and Crown" Swallow 45-10249

=== Albums ===
- Louisiana Aces (1974) Rounder Select 6008
- Cajun Hits Volume 2 (n.d.) Swallow LP 6003
- En Bas Du Chene Vert (1976) Arhoolie Records
- The Best of Cajun Hits Volume 3 (1978) Swallow LP 6033
- The Back Door (1980) Swallow LP 6038
- Cajun Saturday Night (1984) Rounder Select 0198
- No Matter Where You At, There You Are (1988) Rounder Select 6021
- Le Trio Cadien (1992) Rounder Select
- Cajun Memories (1995) Swallow LP 6125
- Happy Go Lucky (2010) Swallow CD 6219

== See also ==
- History of Cajun music
- List of people related to Cajun music
