= Jourdan Thibodeaux =

Cajun musician

- Born: 1986 (age 39–40); Cypress Island, St. Martin Parish, Louisiana, U.S.
- Genres: Cajun music
- Occupations: Musician, singer-songwriter, cultural activist, entrepreneur
- Instruments: Fiddle, vocals
- Years active: 2010s–present
- Label: Valcour Records

Jourdan Thibodeaux (born 1986) is an American Cajun musician, singer-songwriter, cultural activist, and entrepreneur from St. Martin Parish, Louisiana. He is best known as the frontman of the Cajun music band Jourdan Thibodeaux et les Rôdailleurs and as a leading advocate for Cajun French language and cultural preservation.

== Biography ==
=== Early life and education ===
Thibodeaux was born and raised on Cypress Island in St. Martin Parish, Louisiana. He grew up in a francophone Cajun household and learned Cajun French from his grandmother. Surrounded by the Atchafalaya Basin’s rural traditions, he worked on his family’s farm and engaged in local foodways.

As a child, Thibodeaux was influenced by his neighbor Aldus Roger’s fiddler, Louis Foreman, who encouraged him to play the fiddle. He was largely self-taught and began composing songs after the death of his grandmother.

In his early twenties, Thibodeaux was diagnosed with throat cancer. Fearing he would lose his voice, he began composing and recording original songs in Cajun French for his children. After recovering, he decided to dedicate his life to Cajun music.

=== Musical career ===
Thibodeaux fronts the band Jourdan Thibodeaux et les Rôdailleurs, which includes musicians Cedric Watson, Joel Savoy, Alan Lafleur, and Jay Miller.

Their debut album, Boue, Boucane et Bouteilles (2018), consists of twelve original Cajun French compositions inspired by Thibodeaux’s life on Cypress Island. The record received positive reviews, with OffBeat calling the songs "honest and real". Acadiana Profile magazine referred to Thibodeaux as "the future of Cajun music".

In 2023, the band released their second album, La Prière, through Valcour Records. The record incorporated influences from Creole la-la, blues, and African rhythms. OffBeat praised the title track as a "powerful call to action urging Cajuns to embrace their culture and immerse themselves in their language".

Thibodeaux and his band have performed at Festivals Acadiens et Créoles, the New Orleans Jazz & Heritage Festival, SXSW, and the Congrès Mondial Acadien in Canada. In 2024, he was profiled by CBS News’s 60 Minutes, which called him "Cajun music’s equivalent of a rock star" and a "global ambassador for Cajun culture".

=== Cajun cultural activism ===
Thibodeaux is a vocal advocate for the preservation of Cajun French. He shares Cajun French vocabulary and expressions on social media and collaborates with cultural media such as Télé-Louisiane to promote immersion education. He raises his children as French speakers and uses his songwriting to teach the language to younger generations. 60 Minutes highlighted Thibodeaux as a key figure in the ongoing renaissance of Louisiana French culture. In 2026, he has helped to launch Louisiana French classes in collaboration with Cypress Grove Landing.

=== Entrepreneurial and culinary ventures ===
Outside of music, Thibodeaux is also involved in Cajun food traditions and rural entrepreneurship. He lives on Cypress Island, raises livestock, and has worked in commercial Cajun meat production, especially boudin. He has been described as a "sausage-making, violin-playing, French-speaking cowboy".

He regularly participates in traditional boucherie events and collaborates with local food producers to promote Cajun authenticity in Louisiana cuisine.

== Legacy and recognition ==
Thibodeaux is widely recognized as a leading figure in the contemporary Cajun cultural movement. He was featured on 60 Minutes in 2024, bringing national attention to Louisiana’s music and language revival.
