= Kevin Fontenot =

American historian

Kevin Scott Fontenot
- Born: February 18, 1967 (age 59); Eunice, Louisiana, United States
- Occupations: Historian, author, educator
- Years active: 2000–present
- Known for: Expertise in country and Cajun music history
- Spouse: Caroline Gnagy
- Children: Presley and Skeeter (cats)
- Awards: John Dyer Award for Excellence in Teaching (2007)

Academic background
- Education: Louisiana College (BA), Tulane University (MA, PhD candidate)

Academic work
- Notable works: Accordions, Fiddles, Two Step & Swing: A Cajun Music Reader
- Website: Kevin S. Fontenot on Amazon

Kevin Scott Fontenot (born February 18, 1967) is an author and scholar of the American South, focusing on the history of country and Cajun music. Born in Eunice, a city partly in St. Landry Parish, Louisiana, he is a descendant of French colonial soldiers, Acadians, and Anglo-Celtic pioneers. His ancestors include the celebrated Lanier family of court musicians to Henry VIII.

He is the author of numerous articles in books including Country Music Annual, Country Music Goes to War, Shreveport Sounds in Black and White and Ethnic and Border Music. Fontenot is a recognized expert on the career of Jimmie Davis, Louisiana governor and country music star. He is the co-editor of Accordions, Fiddles, Two Step and Swing.

Fontenot holds degrees from Louisiana College and Tulane University. Tulane University's School of Continuing Studies awarded him the John Dyer Award for Excellence in Teaching in 2007. He is a member of the Southern Historical Association, the Louisiana Historical Association, and a frequent speaker at the International Country Music Conference.
