= Mayeus Lafleur =

Mayeus Lafleur (born in Mamou, Louisiana in 1906) was one of the earliest musicians to record Cajun music. Along with fellow musician Leo Soileau, he recorded the standard "He Mon" (which is widely considered to be only the second recorded documentation of the genre), in 1928. However, less than two weeks after the recording session, he was shot to death during a quarrel involving moonshine at a local dance after jumping to the aid of a friend, Alexander Bellon, who was shot first. He was only 22 at the time of his death.
