= Sidney Brown (accordion maker) =

Accordion builder and player (1906–1981)

- Born: October 28, 1906; Church Point, Louisiana, United States
- Died: August 6, 1981 (aged 74) Eunice, Louisiana
- Genres: Cajun
- Occupations: Accordionist, accordion maker
- Instrument: Cajun accordion
- Labels: Folk Star, Swallow

Sidney Brown (October 28, 1906 – August 6, 1981) was a Cajun accordion builder and accordion player. In the 1950s, he recorded with his band, Sidney Brown and the Traveler Playboys. He would eventually be recognized as the first person to build Cajun accordions after World War II in Louisiana. Eventually, other Cajun musicians would play Brown's accordions, including Jo-El Sonnier, Boozoo Chavis and Marc Savoy.

Brown was born in Church Point, Louisiana. By the age of 13, he was playing house dances and fais do-dos. After moving from Church Point to Lake Charles, he formed the band, The Traveler Playboys. He became well known around Lake Charles for his rhythmic, old-timey accordion playing. They began recording for Eddie Shuler and the Goldband Records label in the mid 1950s. Their record Pestauche A Tante Nana would eventually become the third best-selling record in the history of Cajun music. His two-step, "Traveler Playboy Special", is still performed by many Cajun bands.

Before World War II, Cajun accordionists favored German accordions, especially those made by the "Monarch and "Sterling" companies. With the advent of the war, German instruments were no longer available in the United States. Both the "Monarch" and "Sterling" factories were destroyed in the conflict, and after the war, many of Germany’s remaining accordion makers were isolated behind the Iron Curtain in East Germany. Even though John J. Mrnustik, an owner of a music store in Houston, Texas and an immigrant from Eastern Europe, began making accordions after World War II, his prominence in Louisiana was small. The only new accordions available to Cajun musicians in the post-war period were generally inferior instruments, not particularly well-made and not loud enough to be heard over the electric guitar, steel guitar and drums of a full band. With good new accordions in short supply, Brown began experimenting with accordion making, eventually producing high-quality, hand-made instruments. He started by making replacement parts and later used the German model to begin making whole accordions. He would cannibalize the German accordions for reeds, bellows and parts he could not make. He not only was able to help meet the post-war demand for new Cajun accordions but also established a reputation as an accomplished repairman throughout southwestern Louisiana, keeping many old pre-war German-made "Monarchs" and "Sterlings" alive and playing in the hands of their owners. Marc Savoy describes playing an early Sidney Brown accordion:

After playing my first song on the Sidney Brown accordion, I was very very impressed, not just with the fact that it was handmade, but also with the way it handled. It had the response of my Hohner, but with a much smoother keyboard action. The tone was also a major improvement, but unfortunately it did not quite have the bass response that the old pre-wars had.

In 1963, Brown was forced to abandon performing due to a heart condition. He spent the remaining years of his life building and repairing accordions. He produced about 50 instruments a year, many of which are still in use. One of his accordions sits in the Acadian Memorial in St. Martinville, Louisiana. He died on August 6, 1981.

== Discography ==
=== Compilations ===
- Sidney Brown & Shorty LeBlanc – The Best Of Two Cajun Greats (LP-6067 Swallow, 1987)
