= Al Berard =

Al Berard (1960–2014) was a Cajun musician, Grammy-Nominated recording artist, and composer in addition to being considered a world-renowned cajun fiddler.

Berard, influenced by the Cajun songs heard as a young child growing up in South Louisiana, began playing guitar at age eleven. As a student at Cecilia High School, his musical talents allowed him to become an active member of the school's concert band in addition to performing as lead guitarist in a local rock band which he founded.

After graduation, Berard founded The Basin Brothers Band, performing a repertoire of country, traditional and original Cajun French music at festivals, clubs, and workshops throughout the United States and in Europe. The Basin Brothers strived to promote and preserve Cajun culture and music.

Al Berard and the Basin Brothers were nominated for a Grammy Award in 1991 for their debut album, "Let's Get Cajun" in the Best Traditional Folk Album Category.

Berard owned a recording studio in addition to a music publishing company – OPLAMAE Music/BMI. His work included composition, production, recording and editing for television and film in addition to his involvement with the Basin Brothers and other Louisiana bands and projects. He resided in Cecilia, Louisiana.

Al died February 26, 2014, in Lafayette, LA, after suffering an aneurysm the previous night.

AWARDS

4 Incredible Journey
The Basin Brothers Band; "Let's Get Cajun"
The Basin Brothers Band; "Stayin Cajun"
The Basin Brothers Band; "Mulate's Presents: The Basin Brothers"
The Basin Brothers Band; "Dans La Louisiane"
The Basin Brothers Band; "Deux Violons"
The Basin Brothers Band; "Fait a la Main"
Al Berard and Errol Verret; :"C'est Dans La Sang Cadjin"
Al Berard; "Al Berard and Friends"
Al Berard and Karen England; "Feet Off The Ground"

Selected Recordings

The Basin Brothers
2007 Cajun Fiddles (Acadiana ACD 0157) engineer, fiddle, guitar, mandolin, vocals
1996 Dans La Louisiane (Rounder CD 7065) co-producer, fiddle, mandolin, guitar, vocals
1993 Basin Brothers (Bayou Teche) fiddle, electric guitar, mandolin, vocals
1991 Stayin’ Cajun (Flying Fish FF 70581) co-producer, fiddle, guitar, vocals
1990 Let’s Get Cajun (Flying Fish FF 70539) producer, arranger, fiddle, lead guitar, mandolin, vocals
1984 “Now and Then”/”Rowdy Night” (45rpm, Showtime 1066) fiddle

Berard Family Band
2006 Berard Family Band (Old Man Records 8631-2) producer, guitar, mandolin, vocals

Drew Landry and the Dirty Cajuns
2006 Tailgaten Relief & Hurricane Companion EP (Drew Landry) producer, fiddle, guitar, bass

Hadley J. Castille and the Louisiana Cajun Band
1993 Cajun Swamp Fiddler (Swallow SW 6112-2) guitar, mandolin, vocals

Filé
1982 Left Feet (Flying Fish FF 70507) electric guitar, acoustic guitar, vocals

Solo and Duo Projects
2006 Al Berard & Jason Frey, Old Style Cajun Music (Acadiana ACD 0155) fiddle, guitar, vocals
2000 Al Berard & Karen England, Feet Off the Ground (Swallow SW 6162) co-producer, fiddle, vocals
1999 Al Berard and friends play Cajun music from the heart (Swing Cat), producer, performer
1994 Al Berard & Errol Verret, C’est dans le sang Cadjin (Swallow SW 6114-2) co-producer, fiddle, guitar, vocals, mandolin

Compilation credits

2002 Cajun Music: The Essential Collection (Rounder 1166-11604-2), Al Berard & The Basin Brothers
2001 Cajun Sweet Home Louisiana (Cooking Vinyl/Spinart Gumbo CD 020), performer (solo and with The Basin Brothers)
2001 Cajun (Putumayo World Music PUT 184-2) Al Berard & Errol Verret
1998 Cajun & zydeco festival (Rounder ED 7067) Al Berard & the Basin Brothers
1998 Cajun Cookin’ (Rounder ED 7043) Al Berard & the Basin Brothers
1997 Cajun Greats (Rounder ED 7012), Al Berard & the Basin Brothers
1997 Bayou Beat (Rounder ED 7053), Al Berard & the Basin Brothers
1994 More Music from Northern Exposure (MCA ) song “Un Mariage Cassé”

Other recording credits

2007 Nolton Simien, La Danse Finis Pas: Classic Louisiana Creole Music (Al Berard Studios)
2005 Lee Benoit, Ma Petite Femme (Old Man 7935-2) electric slide guitar, acoustic guitar, fiddle, mandolin
2004 Robert Leblanc, Allons à la veille chez Robert (Swallow SW-6184), performer
2001 Kevin Naquin & the Ossun Playboys, Au Coup d’Éclair (Swallow SW-6183) elec. guitar
2001 Pope Huval, Chante Ti Garçon (Swallow SW-6168) producer, editor, performer
2001 Sacaulait, Sac-à-lait Jig (Swallow SW-6165), fiddle
2001 T-Mamou Band Cajun and creole jam (Swallow SW 6160), producer, performer
2000 Lee Benoit, Dis 'n' Dat (MTE 5068-2) fiddle
1999 L’esprit de la Louisiane (Over the Moon Productions OMT-1943), guitar, bass, dulcimer
1999 Becca Begneaud, Merci pour le cadeau (Ame de Louisiane ADL-5001), arranger
1999 Ray Landry and the Basile Cajun Band, Ray Landry and the Basile Cajun Band play traditional style Cajun music (Swallow SW-6156) fiddle
1999 Medicine Show Gatherings of the tribe. Vol. 3 (Acadiana Arts Council), fiddle
1999 Medicine Show Gatherings of the tribe. Vol. 2 (Acadiana Arts Council), fiddle, vocals, guitar (with The Traiteurs and with Big Pecan and The Assorted Nuts)
1999 Native Sons Native Sons (Latanier 5011) mandolin
1998 Alain Gatay with Trans Bayou Express, On est après rouler! (France, CZML 0398)
1998 How’s Bayou, Pardon my French (Artdeco), fiddle, electric guitar
1998 Martin Swinger, Scrapbook
1998 Medicine Show Gatherings of the tribe. Vol. 1 (Acadiana Arts Council), fiddle, guitar (solo and with The Basin Brothers)
1997 Camey Doucet, Mom, I’m still your little boy (Swallow, SW-6140)
1995 Hélène Boudreaux, Pete Bergeron Une deuxième Chance (Swallow SW6120-2), performer
1995 John Dubois, Bayou Ballads (Chaud Dog Jean) guitar
1991 John Dubois, Rendezvous Louisianais (Chaud Dog Jean) acoustic guitar, mandolin, fiddle, background vocals
1990s Trans Bayou Express, Voyage dans le pays Cajun (France, TRE1LA99) fiddle, guitar, vocals
