= J. B. Fuselier =

- Fuselier playing violin

Background information
- Born: Jean Batiste Fuselier; April 17, 1901; Oberlin, Louisiana
- Died: August 16, 1976 (aged 75)
- Genres: Cajun
- Occupations: Musician; fiddler; accordionist
- Instruments: Fiddle; Cajun accordion
- Labels: Bluebird; Folkways; Goldband

Jean Batiste "J.B." Fuselier (April 17, 1901 – August 16, 1976) was a Cajun musician most remembered for his tune "Ma Chere Bassette". He played for many years with the group J. B. and His Merrymakers.

== Early life ==
Fuselier began playing the fiddle when he was five. In a 1937 interview, he claimed that when he started violin, he was too small to pick it up to play. He had to lie on the bed. He also started playing the accordion at a very young age. At the age of nine, he played his first dance.

== String band era ==
In the 1930s, he recorded many records with Victor Records under the banjoist Beethoven Miller's Merrymakers. After Miller left the group in early 1938, Fuselier changed the name to J.B. and His Merrymakers. The group was very successful, drawing large crowds at the Step Inn Club in Lawtell and Fais Do Do in Ville Platte.

== After World War II ==
It was around the end of the war that he met Iry LeJeune. He began playing with Iry Lejeune and the Calcasieu Playboys after he moved to Lake Charles. They played together regularly until 1955 when Lejeune died. Fuselier was driving from the Green Wing Club in Eunice, when his tire was punctured. While changing the tire, a car hit Fuselier's car, killing Lejeune. Fuselier suffered many injuries as well. His daughter remembers his lung was collapsed and he had many broken bones; others mention a head injury. He continued playing with his Merrymakers which consisted of Norris Courville on drums, Desbra Fontenot on steel guitar and Preston Manuel on guitar.

== Legacy ==
Fuselier played for almost his entire life, until his death in 1976. Many other musicians have covered his songs and they are now a part of standard Cajun repertoire. His three most famous songs are "Ma chère Bassette", "Jongle à Moi" and "Chère Tout-Toute". Written for his daughter, he is the first to record "Chère Tout-Toute" which would be re-recorded by many local artists. He never learned to use four fingers when playing the violin. He is quoted as saying, "All that money I made, I made it with three fingers." He is also credited with being the first person to incorporate the steel guitar into Cajun music by hiring Atlas Frugé to play in his band.

- Ma Cher Bassett Listen (MP3)
- Ponce A Moi Listen (MP3)

== Family ==
Fuselier had two daughters, Myrtle "Tout-Toute" Berglund and Ethel Champagne.
