= Wade Frugé =

- Born: August 27, 1916
- Origin: Louisiana
- Died: June 23, 1992 (aged 75)
- Genres: Cajun
- Occupation: Musician
- Instrument: Fiddle
- Labels: Arhoolie Records

Wade Frugé (August 27, 1916 – June 23, 1992) was a Cajun fiddle player in southwest Louisiana. He raised sheep and farmed. He learned to play from contemporaries of his time. His only album was recorded in 1988 with various tunes recorded in 1979, 1983, and 1989 at the home of Marc Savoy. He married Evelyn Courville in 1942 and adopted a child.

- Gumbo Waltz Listen (MP3)

== Discography ==
- "Wade Frugé – Old-Style Cajun Music CD" (LP 5044), 1998.

== See also ==
- List of Notable People Related to Cajun Music
- History of Cajun Music
