= Amédé Ardoin =

Cajun musician (1898–1942)

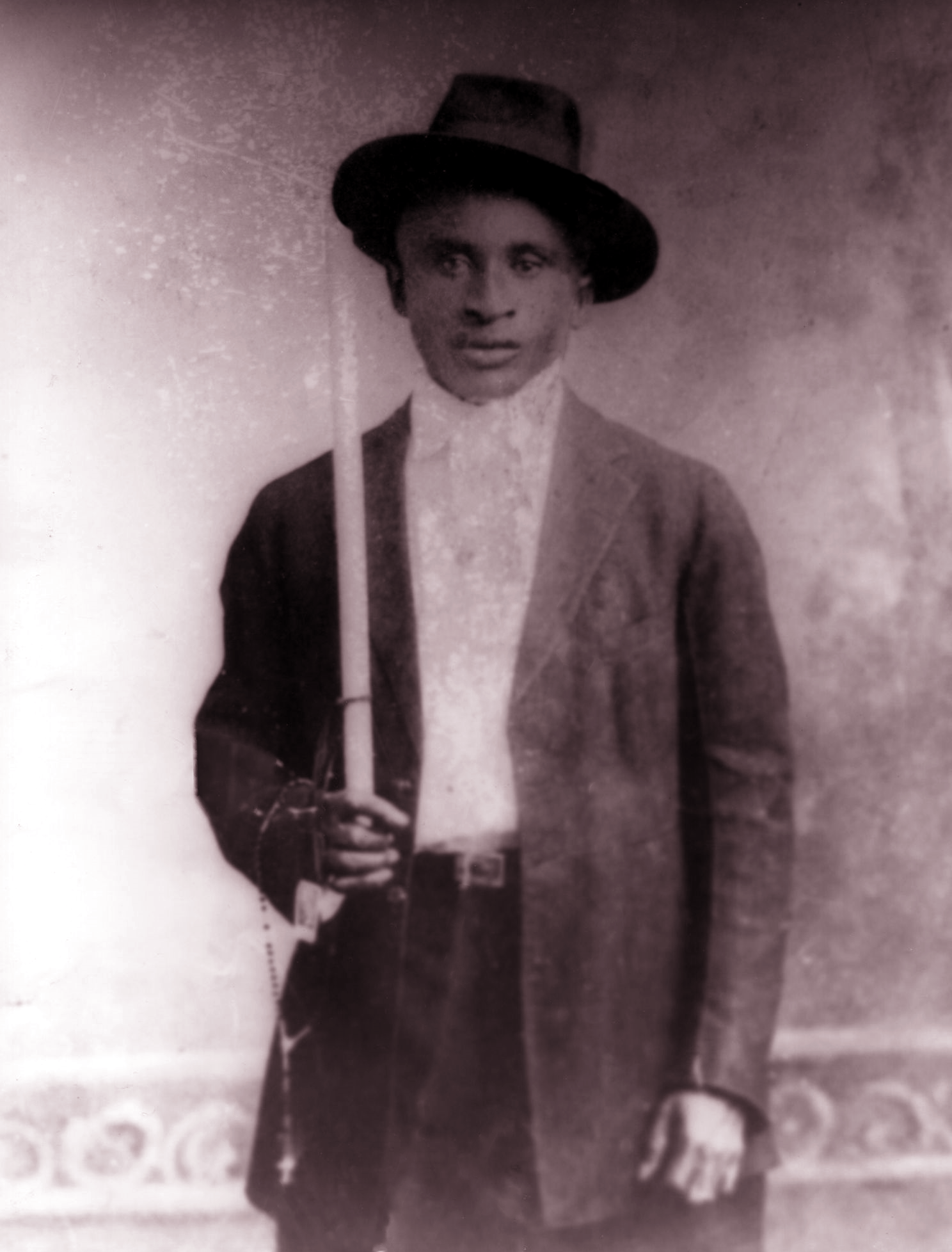
- Amédé Ardoin around 1912, on the occasion of his Confirmation in the Catholic Church.

Background information
- Born: March 11, 1898 near Basile, Evangeline Parish, Louisiana, U.S.
- Died: November 3, 1942 (aged 44) Pineville, Louisiana, U.S.
- Genres: Creole, zydeco
- Occupations: Singer, songwriter, accordionist
- Instruments: Vocals, Cajun accordion
- Labels: Columbia Records, Brunswick, Vocalion, Decca, Melotone, Bluebird, Arhoolie, Tompkins Square

Amédé Ardoin (March 11, 1898 – November 3, 1942) was an American musician, known for his high singing voice and virtuosity on German-made one-row diatonic button accordions.

He is credited by Louisiana music scholars with laying the groundwork in the early 20th century for both Creole and Cajun music. He wrote several songs now regarded as Cajun and zydeco standards. His music and playing greatly inspired post-World War II Cajun accordion makers such as Marc Savoy.

== Early life and career ==
Ardoin was born near Basile in Evangeline Parish, Louisiana a descendant of both enslaved and free people. Ardoin spoke only Cajun French and did not speak English, as was then common for most people in Cajun Country. Developing his musical talents in preference to undertaking farm work, he played at dances, often for Cajun audiences, with fiddle players Alphonse LaFleur and Douglas Bellard. Adam Fontenot, father of fiddler Canray Fontenot, was an early musical influence. He moved around the area frequently, settling at one point near Chataignier, where he met Cajun fiddle player Dennis McGee. They established a more regular musical partnership, playing at local house parties, sometimes attended by Ardoin's young cousin, Alphonse "Bois Sec" Ardoin.

Ardoin and McGee were among the first artists to record the music of the Acadiana region of Louisiana. On December 9, 1929, they recorded six songs for Columbia Records in New Orleans. They made further recordings together in New Orleans in 1930, and in San Antonio, Texas, in August 1934. Ardoin also made solo recordings in New York City in December 1934. The recordings were issued on various labels, including Brunswick, Vocalion, Decca, Melotone and Bluebird. In all, thirty-four recordings with Ardoin playing accordion are known to exist.

His recordings and performances became popular throughout southern Louisiana. In the late 1930s, he played regularly in Eunice, Louisiana with fiddle player Sady Courville, but the two did not record together. Ardoin's music combined "European song forms and African rhythmic approaches such as swing and syncopation... [He] personified this cultural blend and enhanced its development through his deft technique and his ability to improvise. Ardoin was a lively, inventive accordionist who could keep a crowd dancing while playing alone. He was also a soulful singer whose emotional style made dramatic use of elongated, high-pitched notes."

== Later life and death ==
The circumstances that led to Ardoin's death, and the final cause of his death, were uncertain for many years. Contemporaries said that Ardoin suffered from impaired mental and musical capacities later in his life.

Descendants of family members and musicians who knew Ardoin claimed a story, now well-known, that he was severely beaten in a racially motivated attack in about 1939. He was walking home after playing at a house dance near Eunice. The common story said that some white men were angered when a white woman, daughter of the house, lent her handkerchief to Ardoin to wipe the sweat from his face. Ardoin seems never to have fully mentally recovered from this attack.

According to musicians Canray Fontenot and Wade Frugé, in PBS's American Patchwork, claimed that as Ardoin was leaving Eunice, he was run over by a Model A car which crushed his head and throat, damaging his vocal cords. They said he was found the next day, lying in a ditch.

Studies have concluded that he died as a result of a venereal disease. At the end of his life he was cared for in an asylum in Pineville, Louisiana, where he was admitted in September 1942. He died at the hospital two months later. He was buried in the hospital's common grave.

== Legacy ==
The 31 songs recorded by Ardoin have become "an important part of the core repertoire of Cajun and Creole music." Both his accordion playing and vocals have been stylistically influential in Cajun music and zydeco.

Along with bandmates like Dennis McGee, Ardoin "crossed the musical color line" in the Jim Crow South, earning the admiration of listeners of both races and creating temporary social spaces where cultural interchange could take place. Anthropologist Sara Le Menestrel notes, "Ardoin is now considered the father of French music by most local musicians, no matter which subcategory of music [i.e., Cajun or Creole] they identify with."

On March 11, 2018, a life-sized statue of Ardoin was unveiled at the St. Landry Parish Visitor Center. It was based on a well-known photo of him when he received the Catholic sacrament of Confirmation. The statue project was headed by Darrell Bourque, a professor and Louisiana's former Poet Laureate. His book of poetry titled 'If You Abandon Me: An Amédé Ardoin Songbook', features a cover with artwork by Pierre Bourque.

== Discography ==
=== Compilations ===
- Amadé Ardoin – Louisiana Cajun Music Vol. 6 : Amadé Ardoin – The First Black Zydeco Recording Artist (1928–1938) (OT-124 Old Timey Records, 1983)
- Pioneers of Cajun Accordion 1926–1936 (LPOT128 Old Timey / Arhoolie, 1989)
- I'm Never Comin Back: Roots of Zydeco (ARH7007 Arhoolie, 1995)
- Amede Ardoin – Mama, I'll Be Long Gone: The Complete Recordings of Amede Ardoin 1929–1934 (TSQ2554 Tompkins Square Records, 2011)

== See also ==
- History of Cajun Music
- List of Notable People Related to Cajun Music
