= Leo Soileau =

- Born: January 19, 1904; Ville Platte, Louisiana, United States
- Died: August 2, 1980; Ville Platte, Louisiana, United States
- Genres: Cajun
- Occupation: Fiddler
- Instrument: Cajun fiddle
- Labels: Victor, Vocalion, Decca, Bluebird

Leo Soileau (January 19, 1904 – August 2, 1980) was one of the most prolific Cajun recording artists of the 1930s and 1940s, recording over 100 songs, which was a substantial amount considering the reluctance to record the music during its early stages. He is known as the second person to record a Cajun record and the first to record this genre with a fiddle.

== Family ==
Born January 19, 1904 in Ville Platte, Louisiana, Soileau started playing music at 12 years old and made a few dollars each night.

== Music and career ==
After Joe Falcon's recording of "Allons a Lafayette" became a hit, record companies were interested in finding other talent. A jeweler, Frank Dietlein Sr. of Opelousas, Louisiana, convinced Victor Records to record Soileau and Mayeus Lafleur of Basile, Louisiana and in October 18, 1928, they recorded four songs with Victor in Atlanta, Georgia. With Soileau on fiddle and Mayeus on vocal and accordion, their recording of "Mama, Where You At?" (also referred to as "Chere Mom") became the most influential, mainly due to Lafleur's lyrics describing his longing for his mother. After Lafleur was killed in a quarrel over moonshine, gunned down by a stray bullet at a honky-tonk bar in Basile just nine days after the recording, Soileau began recording for Victor and Vocalion with fellow accordionist Moise Robin of Arnaudville, Louisiana the following year. The next month, he teamed up with his cousin, Alius Soileau of Eunice, Louisiana, and recorded four more songs as the duo "Soileau Couzens" in New Orleans as well as with accordionist Oscar "Slim" Doucet. The following day, he would record with Wilfred Fruge. After the depression, he continued to play dances throughout Louisiana and Texas.

In 1934, he started a group called the Three Aces with Floyd Shreve on guitar or Bill Dewey Landry on guitar and Tony Gonzales on drums. Without the accordion, the sound would be country influenced. Soileau would begin recording for Bluebird Records and a major part of inspiration came from western swing, blues, ragtime, and fiddle music of Texas. The following year, he would sign with Decca Records, travel to Chicago, and change the name to the Four Aces. He would record again for Decca in New Orleans in 1936 and Dallas in 1937. After the Four Aces broke away as a separate band, Soileau played with a group he called the Rhythm Boys.

Soileau recorded Cajun music until the start of World War II until Decca decided to stop recording Cajun artists. He continued to perform with his group The Rhythm Boys at places such as the Silver Star in Lake Charles, Louisiana, Showboat in Orange, Texas and Lighthouse in Port Arthur, Texas, until the end of the decade when in 1953 he retired playing music. Soileau made frequent broadcasts over KVOL in Lafayette, Louisiana, KPLC in Lake Charles, Louisiana and KWKH in Shreveport, Louisiana. He continued working in an oil refinery and as a janitor retiring completely in the late 1960s.

He died in 1980 in Ville Platte, Louisiana and was funeralized at Sacred Heart Catholic Church.

== Discography ==
- Mom, Where You At?
- Hackberry Hop
- La Blues De Port Arthur

=== Compilations ===
- Early Rural String Bands (LPV-552 RCA Victor, 1968)
- Early American Cajun Music: The Early Recordings of Leo Soileau (2041 Yazoo Records, January 19, 1999)
- Leo Soileau: Louisiana Cajun Music Vol. 7 (LP125 Arhoolie)
- Le Gran Mamou: A Cajun Music Anthology - The Historic Victor–Bluebird Sessions 1928–1941 Vol. 1 (CMF-013-D Country Music Foundation, 1990)

== See also ==
- List of people related to Cajun music
- History of Cajun Music
