= Floyd Soileau =

American record producer (born 1938)

James Floyd Soileau
- Born: November 2, 1938 (age 87); Ville Platte, Louisiana, U.S.
- Genres: Cajun, country, swamp blues, swamp pop, zydeco
- Occupation: Record producer
- Years active: 1950s–present
- Labels: Flat Town Music Company, Big Mamou, Vee-Pee, Swallow, Jin, Maison de Soul, Kom-a-day, ZBC, Home Cooking, La Louisian
- Website: http://www.flattownmusic.com/Floyds-Record-Shop-C523.aspx

James Floyd Soileau (born November 2, 1938) is an American record producer.

== Biography ==
Soileau was born in Faubourg, a small community between Ville Platte and Washington, Louisiana. He grew up speaking Cajun French and did not speak English until attending school at the age of 6 years. In his junior year of high school, he did an afternoon Cajun music show as a part-time job with KVPI radio in Ville Platte. After graduating from Ville Platte High School in 1956, he opened a small record store, Floyd's Record Shop, and discovered that although people were still interested in them, Cajun French records were no longer being produced. With the financial help of a friend, Ed Manuel (a juke box operator from Mamou, Louisiana), who wanted new French records for his juke boxes, Floyd released his first record on the Big Mamou label by artists Austin Pitre and Milton Molitor. In 1957 Lawrence Walker and Aldus Roger helped Floyd launch his own label, Swallow Records. The following year, he joined Broadcast Music, Inc. as a publisher under the company name of Flat Town Music. "Flat Town" was chosen as English for "Ville Platte," but also because Soileau's initial submissions were rejected for similarity to existing BMI members, and he figured that "flat town" would not already be in use.

In 1958, Soileau launched Floyd's Wholesale Distributing Co., which also specialized in servicing jukeboxes and record stores in the region. In 1964, the record shop moved to a larger location on Ville Platte's Main Street. In addition to records, and eventually cassettes and CDs, the shop carried books, musical instruments, souvenirs, and photography supplies, and even developed film.

Over the past 40 years, Swallow Records has released 265 45rpm single records and 151 albums of Cajun French music, including recordings by Adam Hebert, Belton Richard, Dewey Balfa and the Balfa Brothers, Nathan Abshire, Jambalaya Cajun Band, Paul Daigle & Cajun Gold, D.L. Menard, and many more, plus recordings by the Cajun French storyteller Marion Marcotte. 1958 saw the beginning of Jin Records with artists such as Clint West, Tommy McLain & the Boogie Kings, Lil' Bob & The Lollipops, Warren Storm, Skip Stewart, Rockin' Sidney, Rod Bernard, Johnny Allan and others making significant contributions to what was the, then, controversial swamp pop music. In 1975 he established his Maison de Soul record label, devoted to Creole and zydeco music, including artists such as Clifton Chenier, Rockin' Dopsie, Keith Frank, Chris Ardoin, Zydeco Force, Jeffery Brousard, and others. Some of the hit singles produced by Soileau include Rockin' Sidney's "My Toot Toot," Keith Frank's "Movin' On Up," and Don Fontenot's "Ride the Donkey." He has always encouraged his artists to compose new songs to record, and his Flat Town Music Company now publishes over 2800 songs, a majority of which are Cajun, swamp pop, and zydeco songs.

His Swallow Publications has published two books on the Cajun French language, Cajun Dictionary and Cajun Self-taught, both by Rev. Jules Daigle, and Jeff Hannusch's I Hear You Knockin', the story of early New Orleans rhythm and blues. He operated Swallow Recording Studios in Ville Platte for over 15 years, and sold his last studio in 1975 to Ronnie Kole, who moved the studio to Slidell, Louisiana. That year he opened a vinyl record pressing plant and printing company for LP record jackets and labels, the only such facility in Louisiana. In 1988, a writer for Billboard estimated that Flat Town Music labels were responsible for about 75% of Cajun and zydeco titles in print at the time.

The record pressing plant closed in 1994. Eventually, the store closed but the online mail order business continues.

In 1959, he married his high school sweetheart Jinver Ortego, after whom Jin Records is named. They have three daughters, Catherine, Connie and Cindy, and one son, Christopher. Floyd was inducted into the Acadian Museum in Louisiana on October 19, 2002.

Swallow
- Genre: Cajun, country, swamp blues, swamp pop
- Country of origin: United States
- Location: Ville Platte, Louisiana, U.S.

Jin
- Genre: Cajun, country, swamp blues, swamp pop
- Country of origin: United States
- Location: Ville Platte, Louisiana, U.S.

Maison de Soul
- Founded: 1974
- Genre: Zydeco, blues
- Country of origin: United States
- Location: Ville Platte, Louisiana, U.S.
