= Aldus Roger =

- Born: Aldus Roger; February 10, 1915; Carencro, Louisiana, U.S.
- Died: April 4, 1999 (aged 84)
- Genres: Cajun
- Occupation: musician
- Instrument: Cajun accordion
- Labels: TNT, Feature, Acadian Artists, Goldband, Cajun Classics, La Lou, Swallow
- Formerly of: Lafayette Playboys

Aldus Roger (February 10, 1915 – April 4, 1999) was an American Cajun accordion player in southwest Louisiana, best known for his accordion skills, and television music program.

== Early life ==
Aldus Roger was born in Carencro, Louisiana and learned to play the Cajun accordion at age eight. His father, Francis Roger, didn't want him to play accordion; however, he would borrow it and play in the barn.

== Lafayette Playboys ==
Roger led the Lafayette Playboys for over twenty years. During the late 1950s and 1960s, he hosted his own music program Passe Partout on KLFY-TV 10 in Lafayette. Among his many recordings are "KLFY Waltz," "Channel 10 Two Step," "Mardi Gras Dance," and "Lafayette Two Step (1964)." He also recorded a Cajun French version of Hank Williams country-and- western hit "Jambalaya (On the Bayou)" (which Williams in turn had based on the Cajun tune "Grand Texas").

He recorded several albums, one with Rounder Records entitled "Aldus Roger & the Lafayette Playboys - Legend Series" in 1998 and another with La Louisiane Records entitled "Plays the French Music of South Louisiana" in 1993.

The Aldus Roger song "Les Haricots Sont Pas Salés" (translated: "The Snap Beans Ain't Salty") is covered by Ambrose Thibodeaux in some of The Sims.

== See also ==
- List of Notable People Related to Cajun Music
- History of Cajun Music

== Bibliography ==
- Savoy, Ann (1986) [1984]. Cajun Music a Reflection of a People. Eunice, Louisiana: Bluebird Press. ISBN 978-0-930169-00-8.
