= Cajun music =

Style of music

- Stylistic origins: Acadian ballads
- Cultural origins: Late 18th century, Cajuns in Louisiana, New Spain

Subgenres
- Black Creole

Fusion genres
- Swamp pop; swamp rock; zydeco

Other topics
- Country

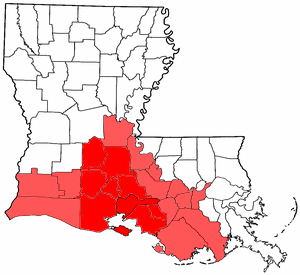
Map of Cajun Country.

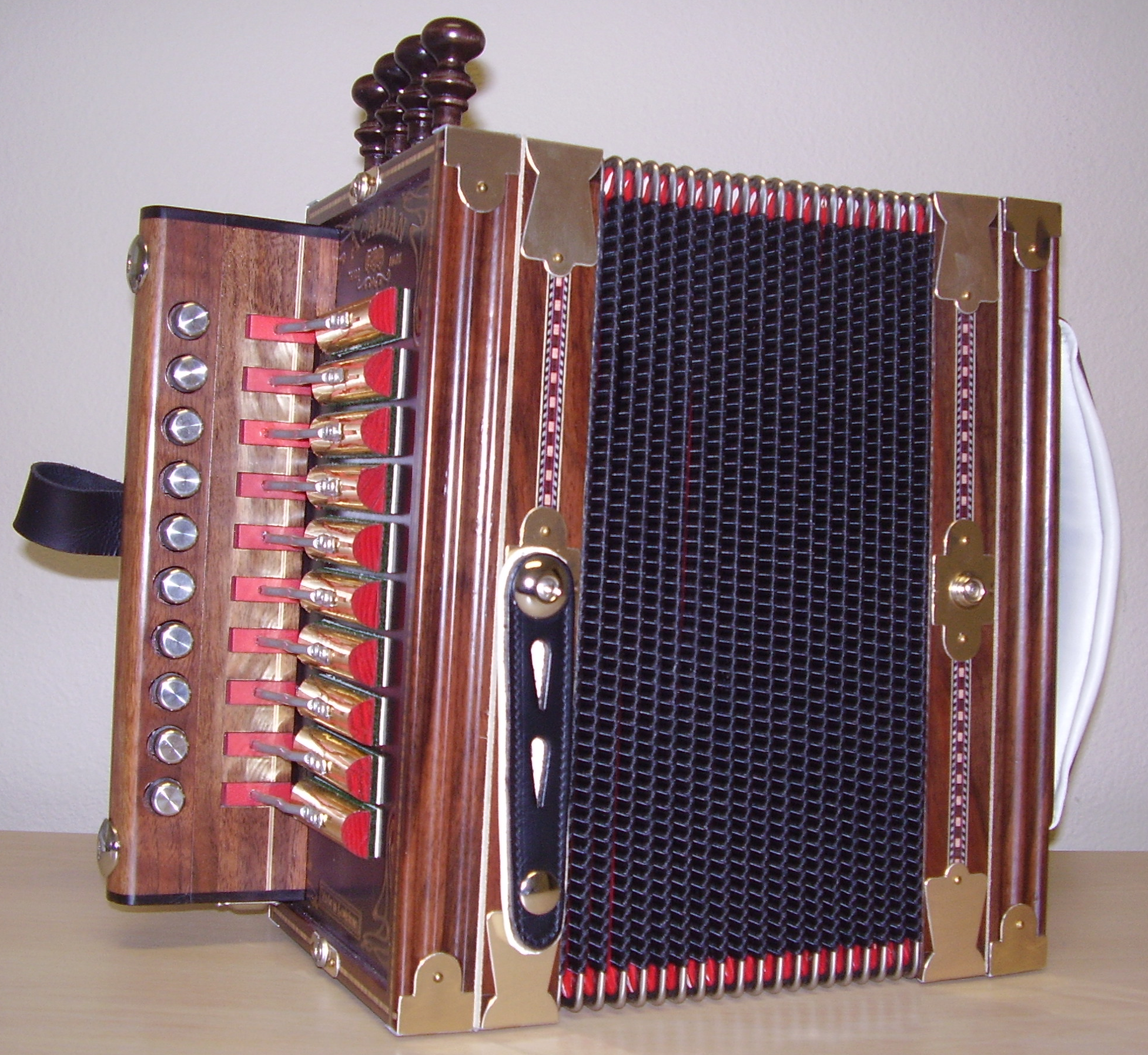
A Cajun diatonic accordion.

Cajun music (French: Musique cadienne) is a traditional genre of music from Louisiana. An emblematic music of Louisiana played by the Cajuns, it is rooted in the ballads of the French-speaking Acadians of Canada. Although they are two separate genres, Cajun music is often mentioned in tandem with the Creole-based zydeco music. Both are from southwest Louisiana and share French and African origins. These French Louisiana sounds have influenced American popular music for many decades, especially country music, and have influenced pop culture through mass media, such as television commercials.

== Musical theory ==
Cajun music is relatively catchy with an infectious beat and a lot of forward drive, placing the accordion at the center. The accordionist gives the vocal melody greater energy by repeating most notes. Besides the voices, only two melodic instruments are heard, the accordion and fiddle, but usually in the background can also be heard the high, clear tones of a metal triangle. The harmonies of Cajun music are simple and the melodic range is just one octave, rising a fifth above the tonic and descending a fourth below. Because the Cajun accordion is a diatonic instrument (do-re-mi or natural major scale) it can only play tunes in a few keys. For example, a "C" accordion is tuned such that the entire C scale is available on the ten buttons (over two octaves) and it can play a tune in the key of C with all the notes of the C scale available (C-D-E-F-G-A-B). A "C" accordion can also play a few Cajun songs in the key of F however the Bb note will be missing. Also it can play in the key of D with a "bluesy" sound since the F natural note becomes a flat third or minor third in the key of D. However a skilled accordion player can play in these other keys and still make good music whereby the notes missing (because of the limitations of the diatonic tuning) are not needed by the melody. Since an instrument must match the singer's range, much Cajun singing is sung in the singer's upper range.

== History of Cajun music ==
=== Origins ===
It is unlikely that musical instruments were introduced to colonial Louisiana before around 1780. Although originally there were no instruments, there were songs. Families sang traditional French songs called complaintes which the Cajuns adapted to their new ways of life. The first known record was of a violin in 1780 and a fiddle and clarinet player in 1785. The diatonic accordion was introduced to Cajun music in the mid- to late-1800s. It became popular because of its volume which, along with the fiddle, created sufficient accompaniment for dancing. Originally, musicians and singers performed at house dance parties known as bals de maison. However Cajun music, born from ballads, later transformed to dance music—played with or without words. The music was essential for small get-togethers on the front porch, bals de maison, and public dances in dance halls called fais do-dos.

=== Traditional Cajun (before 1930) ===
Balfa Brothers - J'ai Passé Devant Ta Porte
An example of a popular Cajun Waltz.

This style comprises the roots of Cajun dance music, involving only a few instruments such as the Cajun accordion, fiddle, and triangle. This form holds firm to a basic rhythm with staccato style notes, including many fiddle double stops. Each fiddle solo is composed of a major scale riff, repeated between verses. This form has existed since the early 1900s and the waltz and two-step are the most common dances of this Cajun music genre. Many songs that became standards in the Cajun music repertoire were first recorded in this period of the 1920s and 1930s. The first commercial recording of Cajun music, "Lafayette (Allon au Laufette)," was made by Joe Falcon and his future wife Cléoma Breaux for Columbia Records on April 27, 1928. A number of the most prominent traditional Cajun musicians are featured in the 1989 documentary J'ai Été Au Bal. Amédé Ardoin, Canray Fontenot, Wade Frugé, Dewey Segura, Joe Falcon and Cléoma Falcon, and the Breaux Brothers are examples of this genre.

=== Country and Texas swing Cajun (pre-war/1934–1941) ===
This style draws from Texas country music and moves away from the traditional accordion sound. It has more of a swing style popularized by Bob Wills and the Texas Playboys. Instead of being dominated by the accordion, Cajun swing relies significantly on the fiddle and piano with a swinging tempo. Bands in the 1940s began using the steel guitar, an instrument also found in Cajun dancehall music. Dances such as "the jig" are common in this genre of Cajun music. Leo Soileau, J. B. Fuselier, Leroy "Happy Fats" Leblanc, Harry Choates and the Hackberry Ramblers are early examples of this style. The Red Stick Ramblers and The Lost Bayou Ramblers are Cajun swing bands from the 1990s.

=== Fais do-dos (Cajun dance halls - 1946-1960) ===
In Cajun Louisiana, public dancehalls are known as fais do-dos. This expression may have evolved from a practice of bringing children to dance halls to lull them to sleep. In French, fais do-do means "go to sleep". This style originated in the post-war era of the late 1940s and continues to the present-day in small town dancehalls. During this early period, bands changed from performing at house dances to large halls.

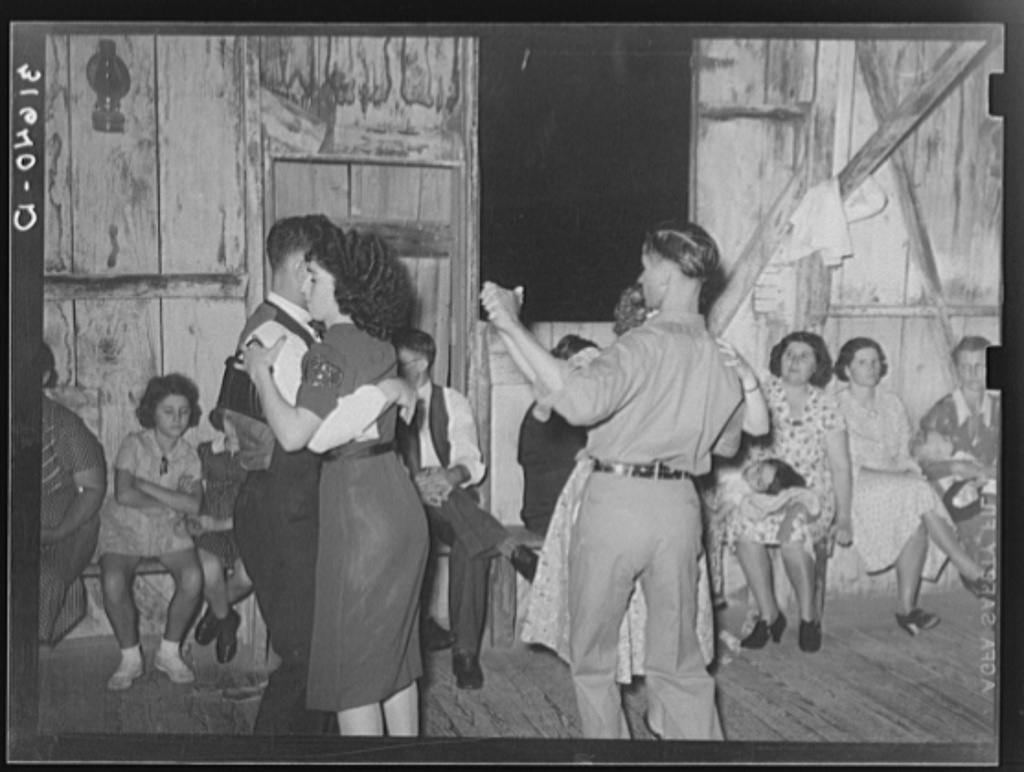
Fais do-do near Crowley, Louisiana in 1938.

Fais do-do music is similar to the traditional Cajun music of house dances, with added accompaniment such as the bass guitar, drum kit, steel guitar, and rhythm guitar, electric or acoustic. The same abrupt, staccato feel can also be felt. The implementation of electrical amplification allowed instruments to cut through the noise of the crowd and be heard throughout the dance hall. Electrification of the dance venues also allowed the fiddle to be played in a smoother style and alternate leads with the accordion. The steel guitar also adds remarks. Typically in dancehall Cajun performances the melody is played by the accordion followed by a bridge, a vocal verse, leading lines by the steel guitar, fiddle, and accordion followed finally by a bridge. This is followed by the next vocal verse, and so on. Lawrence Walker, Aldus Roger, Nathan Abshire, Iry LeJeune, Al Berard, and Sidney Brown are examples of this musical period. The characteristics of dancehall Cajun can be seen in current artists such as Jesse Légé and The Basin Brothers Band.

=== Cajun "renaissance" (1970s-present) ===
Drawing on elements of the earlier traditional, Texas swing, and dancehall periods, the Cajun "renaissance" also incorporates more modern elements of folk, blues, jazz and swamp pop, and bluegrass styles. The fiddle players relax, involving a more legato feel to the solos. The quick fiddle action and double stops are missing, replaced by dominant blues chords and jazz slides.

Pioneers such as BeauSoleil with Michael Doucet, Zachary Richard, Jambalaya Cajun Band, Bruce Daigrepont, and others broke new ground, while other musicians such as Eddie LeJeune, Irvin LeJeune, Homer LeJeune, the Pine Leaf Boys, and others brought energy to older, more traditional forms.

In 1964, Gladius Thibodeaux, Louis "Vinesse" Lejeune, and Dewey Balfa represented Louisiana at the Newport Folk Festival in Rhode Island. Their concert was a success and this was a turning point in the awareness of Cajun music at a national level.

=== Contemporary Cajun music (1980s-present) ===
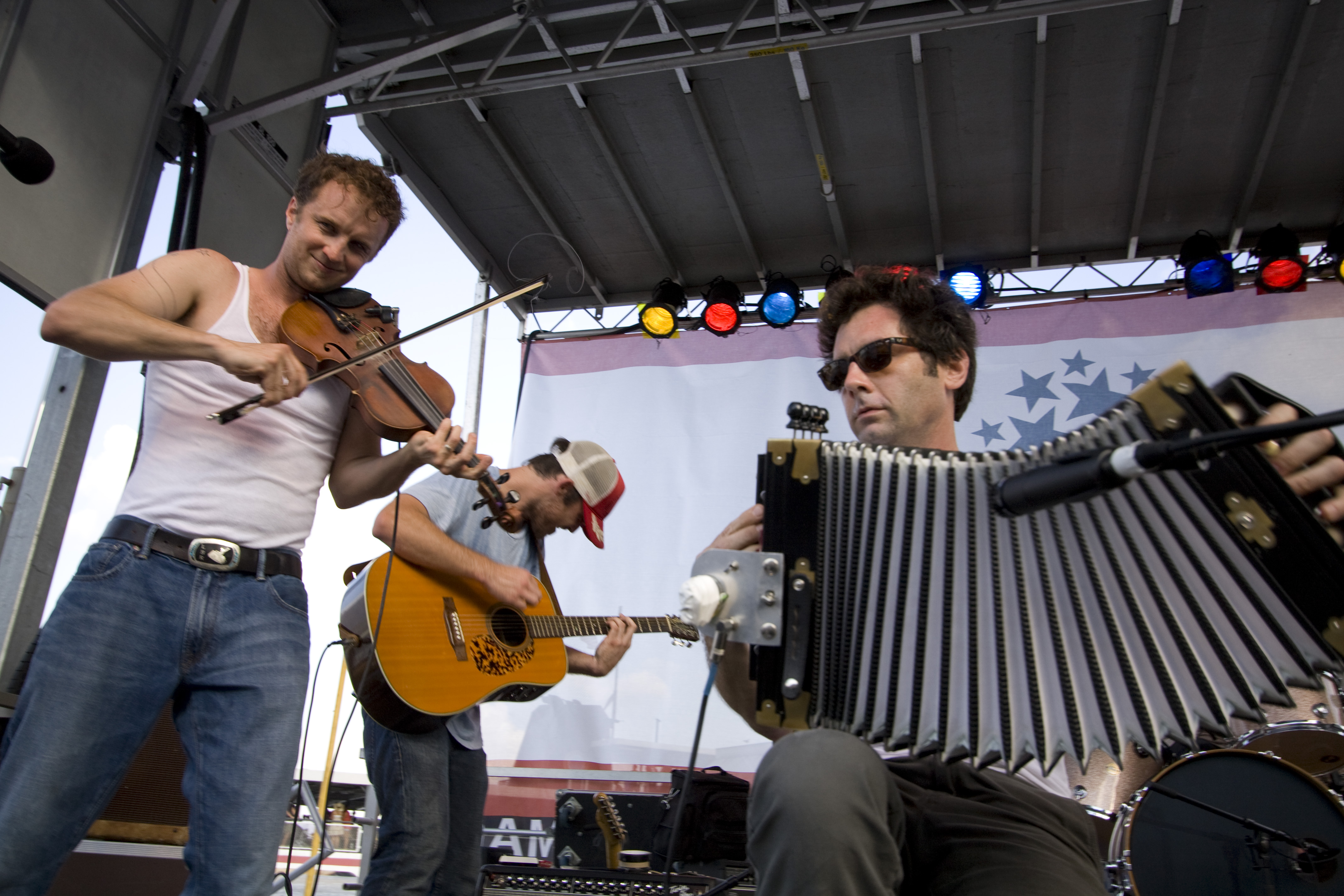
Lost Bayou Ramblers, New Orleans.

Contemporary Cajun music is influenced by rock, R&B, blues, soul, and zydeco music. Although led by the accordion, the electric guitar, washboard, and keyboard are all present in this form. Musicians such as Wayne Toups, Roddie Romero and the Hub City Allstars, Lee Benoit, Damon Troy, Kevin Naquin, Trent LeJeune, and Steve Riley and the Mamou Playboys have popularized this modern form of Cajun music. The band Atchafalaya, active from 1982 to 1986, is another example of this style. More recently, the Lost Bayou Ramblers have experimented with mixing traditional instruments and cutting-edge technology, as showcased on their last two records, Mammoth Waltz (2012) and Kalenda (2017). This sound has been dubbed “Heavy Cajun Psych”.

Doug Kershaw recorded "Louisiana Man", an autobiographical song that he wrote while in the army. The song sold millions of copies and, over the years, it has come to be considered a standard of modern Cajun music. "Louisiana Man" has been covered by more than 800 artists.

== Lyrics and instruments ==
The unaccompanied ballad was the earliest form of Cajun music. These narrative songs often had passionate themes of death, solitude or ill-fated love — a reaction to their harsh exile and rough frontier experience, as well as celebrations of love and humorous tales. Ballads were ritually sung at weddings and funerals, and sung informally for small groups of people at house parties as the food cooked and young children played.

The early songs were mixtures of la la, contra dances, reels and jigs and other folk influences from Black, white and Native American traditions. Early song lyrics were entirely in Cajun French. Though songwriting in French is still common, today some Cajun music is sung in English with younger singers and audiences.

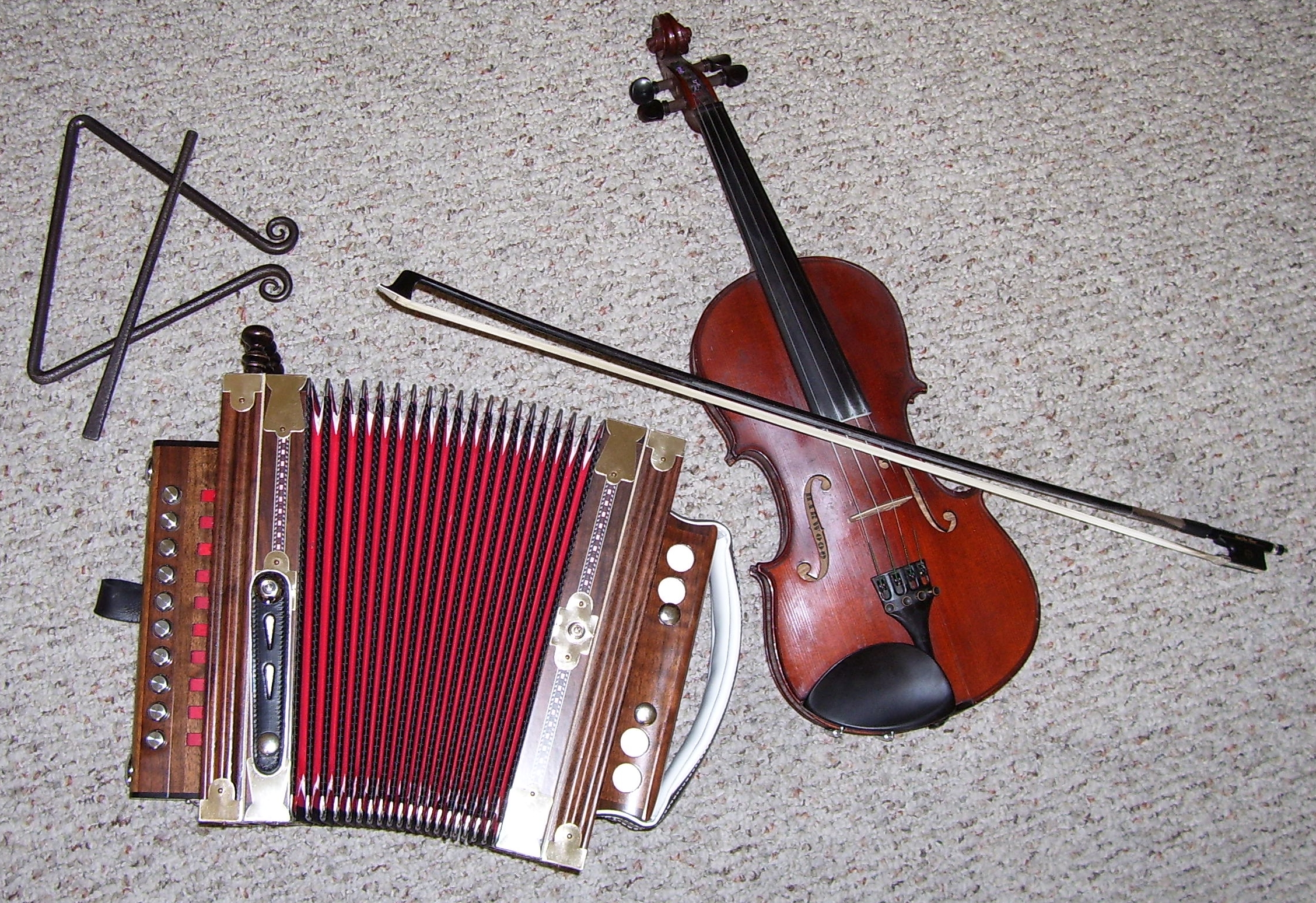
Traditional Cajun instruments: tit-fer, Cajun accordion, and a fiddle.

In earlier years, the fiddle was the predominant instrument. Usually two fiddles were common, one playing the melody while the other provided the séconde, or back-up part. Twin fiddling traditions represent the music in its purest form, as it was brought to Louisiana with the early immigrants and before popular American tunes mingled with it. Gradually, the Cajun accordion emerged to share the limelight.

In the early 1930s, the accordion was pushed into the background by the popular string sounds of the time. Piano and other string instruments joined fiddle to create a jazzy swing beat strongly influenced by Western Swing of neighboring Texas. The Cajun fiddle was a well established instrument which had been somewhat eclipsed by the German accordion fad, which had similar effect in French Canada. But in the Depression era the tide turned, and, according to Stricklin et al., it had never been eclipsed.

After World War II, the accordion regained its popularity in Cajun music. Also, in the late 1930s and 1940s, country music became the dominant influence on Cajun music, and steel guitar and bass were introduced.

Modern Cajun music began taking on the influence of jazz and modern country music, resulting in a more polished sound. The acoustic guitar was added, mostly as a rhythm instrument, and the triangle provided a traditional percussion. Modern groups sometimes include drums, electric bass, electric guitars and amplified accordion and fiddles.

== Dance and festivals ==
There are several variations of Cajun dance: a Cajun one-step, also called a Cajun jig, a Cajun two-step, also called a Cajun Jitterbug, and a Cajun Waltz. In mild contrast, zydeco dancing is a syncopated two-step or jitterbug. A Cajun dancer will cover the dance floor while the zydeco dancer will primarily dance in a smaller area. Cajun music can be found predominantly at Louisiana festivals and dance halls, in addition to weddings in Acadiana.

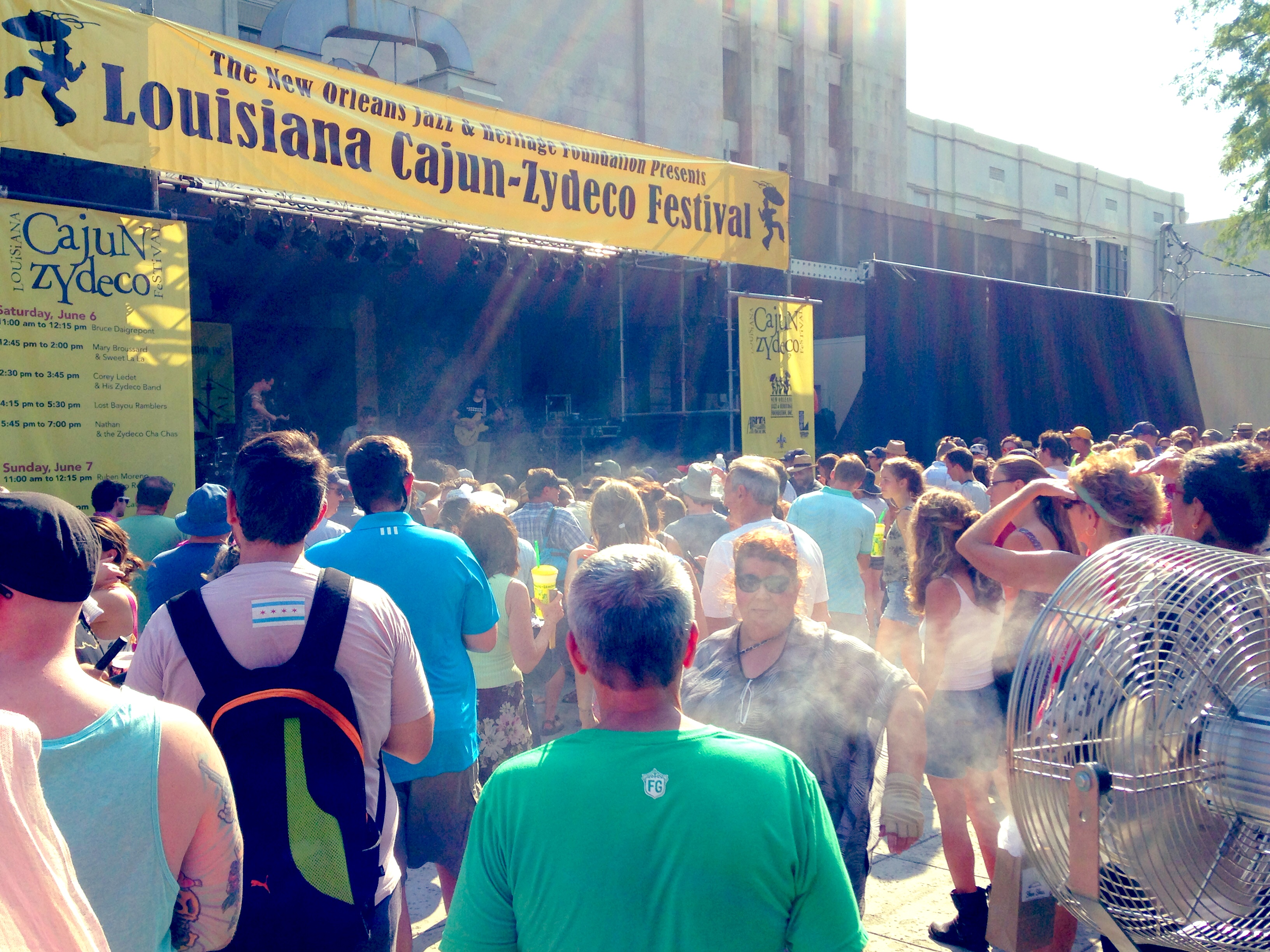
Louisiana Cajun-Zydeco Festival, 2015.

In 1968, CODOFIL (the Council for the Development of French in Louisiana) was created. The goal of this agency, which still exists, was to promote Cajun culture and combat negative stereotypes. In 1974, CODOFIL created the three-hour Tribute to Cajun Music festival, later renamed the Festival de Musique Acadienne, in order to revive an interest in Cajun music and culture among the younger generation.

== See also ==
- List of people related to Cajun music
- Cajun French Music Association
