= Keith Frank =

American zydeco accordionist

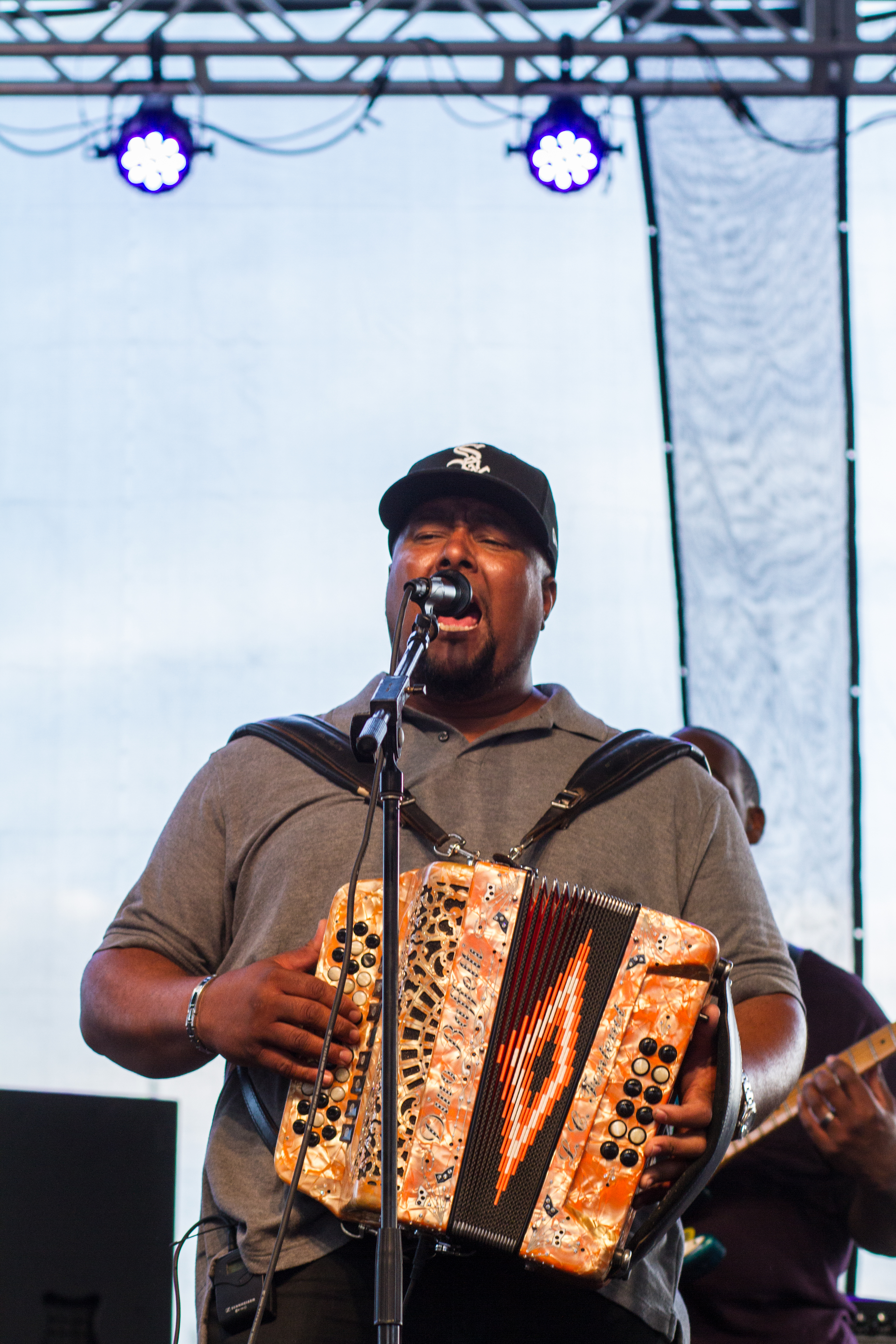
- Keith Frank in Shreveport, Louisiana in 2018

Background information
- Born: Keith Frank; October 9, 1972 (age 54)
- Origin: Soileau, Louisiana
- Instruments: Accordion, vocals, guitar
- Years active: 1990–present
- Labels: Lanor, Soulwood, Shanachie Records, Maison de Soul
- Website: www.keithfrank.com

Keith Frank (born October 9, 1972) is an American singer, accordion player, and producer. Dubbed the "Zydeco Boss," Frank is one of the most well-known figures in zydeco music, especially in the nouveau zydeco sound, which was influenced by other genres such as R&B and hip-hop. He is most known for his work with the Soileau Zydeco Band, which was established in 1990.

== Music career ==
=== Beginnings ===
Keith Frank was born on October 9, 1972, in the community of Soileau, Louisiana, between the cities of Oberlin and Elton. The son of zydeco musician Preston Frank, he started playing the drums in his father's Preston Frank Swallow Band when he was four years old, with him first playing the accordion at six years old. By age nine, he took over the full-time drumming duties in his dad's band. Despite his involvement, Frank was initially not fond of zydeco, saying in an interview:

I hated it. I swear, I hated it. I could not stand playing music. I hated zydeco, I hated the whole thing. My old man would make me practice, and I could always find something better to be doing.

However, as his father's employment at a plywood plant became less flexible, Frank assumed more and more responsibility within the band. As his father became less available as a result, Frank said that "I realized [zydeco]'s a part of my life, and I couldn't stand being without it."

Starting in 1982, the Preston Frank Family Band recorded albums under the Lanor Records label after Preston visited Church Point, Louisiana, to meet with the label's founder Lee Lavergne. The band released a series of records under the label, ending with the 1991 Let's Dance.

=== Early career ===
While attending Oberlin High School in 1990, he formed his own group, Keith Frank and the Soileau Zydeco Band, with his sister Jennifer on bass and his brother Brad on drums. In 1991, the group performed at the Finger Lakes GrassRoots Festival of Music and Dance in Trumansburg, New York, an event they would headline for several years following that. The debut release for the group came in 1992, with the cassette single On the Bandstand, also released under the Lanor label. This ended up being Frank's last recording under Lanor, as disagreements arose between Frank and Lavergne about production of the album.

The following year, the group released Get on Boy! under the Eunice, Louisiana-based Hound Records. Frank was active in every stage of production of the album, which led to him earning the moniker "The Zydeco Boss," which has stuck with him for the rest of his career. Around this time, a feud began to develop between Frank and upcoming zydeco artist Beau Jocque. The feud started in 1993, when Frank released the song "Went Out Last Night" on the Get on Boy! album. Jocque later released the song Yesterday on his 1994 album Pick Up on This!. For all practical purposes, the two were the same song, causing controversy within the zydeco community about originality. Ultimately, the songs were determined to both trace back to "I Got Loaded," a 1965 R&B single by Camille Bob. Over the course of the mid-nineties, the two would trade disses in their music.

In 1994, Frank's album What's His Name?, the first of his to be released under the Maison de Soul label, came close to matching genre best-seller Jocque's sales. Further, the song "One Shot" marked the peak of Frank and Jocque's rivalry, featuring more up-front disses, including more explicit lyrics, which was matched with Jocque's "What's Wrong with the Get-On Boy?", which led to further controversy due to play time on the Washington, Louisiana-based KNEK radio station. Don Wilson, owner of the station, threw out Frank's discs after an argument, and played "What's Wrong with the Get-On Boy?" nearly every day for a time.

His 1996 release Movin' on Up, featuring a zydeco rendition of the theme song of the television show The Jeffersons, quickly gained popularity, selling about 13,000 units in two months. It was originally hypothesized that the song could match the national success of Rockin' Sidney's "My Toot-Toot." Upon its release, record producer Floyd Soileau said of Frank:

He's got that magic mix that keeps fans dancing and hollering for more. And he's a real worker: It's not unusual for him to do three shows in three different places in one day, and not many bands around here do that.

By the late 1990s, he was known as the “undisputed ruler of the local scene,” regularly selling out shows in Southwest Louisiana and East Texas. Further, he was Maison de Soul's top-selling zydeco artist by 1998.

In 2001, Frank and his Soileau Zydeco Band released The Masked Band under the pseudonym The Creole Connection. Taking care to conceal the identities of the members, the band performed in costumes while live. Twenty years later, Frank reused The Creole Connection moniker and re-recorded much of The Masked Band under the new title The Resurrection of The Creole Connection, released under which included a few new songs while omitting some on the original recording.

=== Later career ===
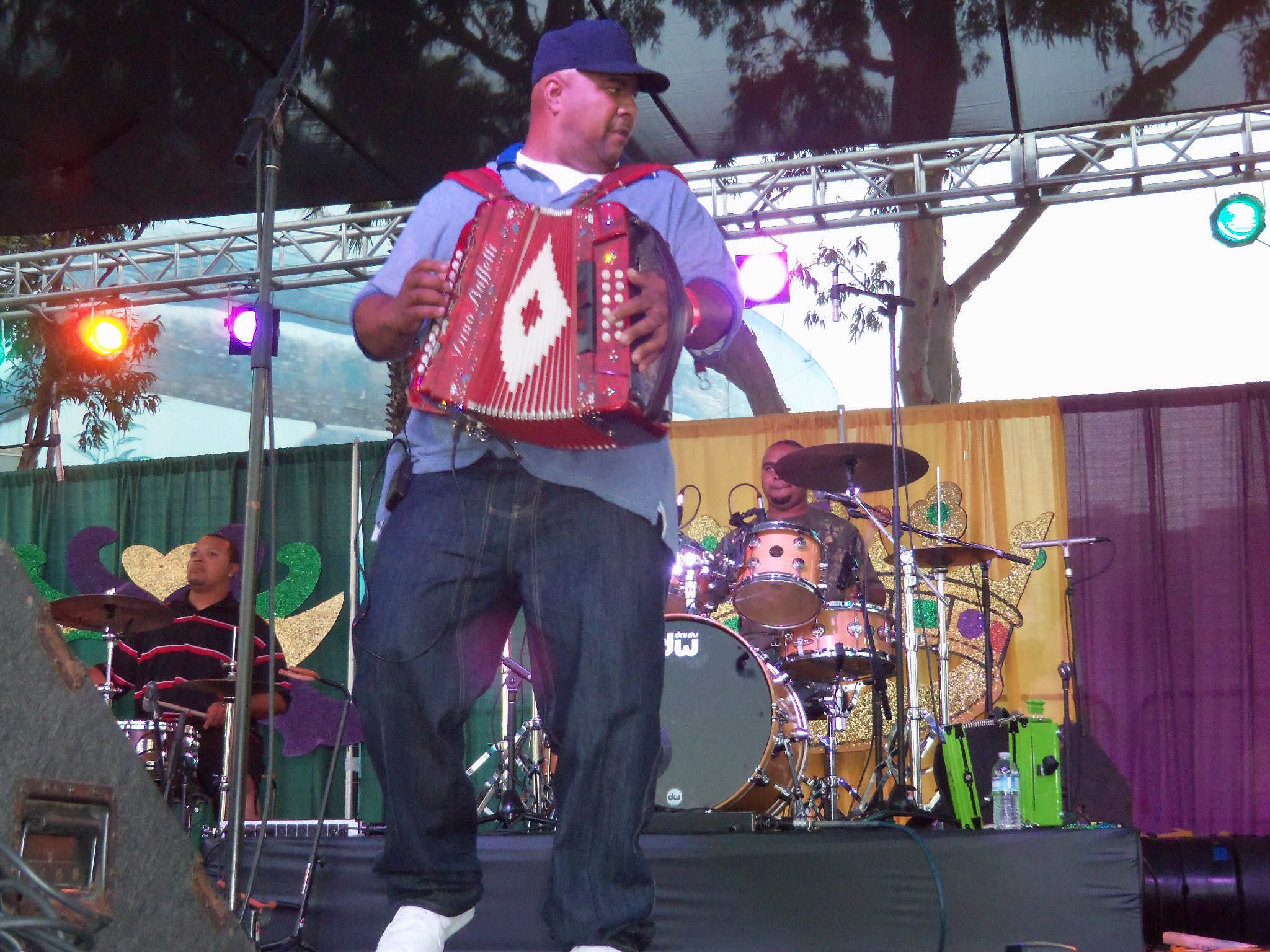
Keith Frank performing in Long Beach, California, in 2011

Journalist Melissa Block chose the single "Missing Out on a Date" from his 2008 album Loved. Feared. Respected. as one of her five quintessential zydeco songs in a 2009 NPR piece. In particular, she noted that:

This is for when the party's winding down, your feet are aching and you don't think you can possibly dance to one more song. But sure you can, though, especially if it's Keith Frank's R&B-infused zydeco. I love that this song lets you hear his fingers pattering on the buttons of his accordion.

Haterz, a song from that same album, was later remixed to feature rapper Lil Boosie, which became a hit. The Louisiana Ragin' Cajuns softball team used the song as a line dance during games.

In 2012, Frank created the Creole Renaissance Festival, a music festival held every Labor Day weekend in Opelousas, Louisiana, honoring Creole culture and hosting Creole food, a dance contest, and music. In 2015, following a dispute with the St. Landry Parish government, Frank moved the festival to Rayne, Louisiana, where it remains today.

At the beginning of the COVID-19 pandemic, Frank went on a hiatus, which ended in September 2021, when he performed in Lafayette, Louisiana. Since then, Frank and his band have performed at the New Orleans Jazz & Heritage Festival, and is scheduled to perform at South by Southwest.

== Personal life ==
Frank graduated with a degree in electrical engineering from McNeese State University in 1998. He is a Christian.

== Musical style ==
Frank is described as one of the main figures in the nouveau zydeco genre first popularized by Zydeco Force and Boozoo Chavis, acts that Frank grew up watching. This style prominently features a bass drum, being struck to a beat called "double-kicking," where the drum is struck twice in quick succession. The style lends itself to the juré music prevalent in the Acadiana region of Louisiana. The style is further influenced by the genres of R&B, hip-hop, and reggae. Todd Ortego, a record store owner and Cajun music radio host, described Frank's accordion style as similar to that of Boozoo Chavis.

Frank's style has attracted criticism from some, including from Cajun folklorist and professor Barry Jean Ancelet, who called his 1996 novelty song Going to McDonald's representative of an "impoverished culture." Further, fellow performer Jeffery Broussard said that Frank's music "is nothing but bass drum, where I feel I want to hear that accordion," adding that the new style of playing makes traditional zydeco "sound weak" to new listeners.

== Discography ==
=== Studio albums ===
Title	Details
On the Bandstand (Keith Frank and Soileau Zydeco Band)	Released: 1993; Label: Lanor; Format: Cassette
Get On Boy! (Keith Frank and the Soileau Zydeco Band)	Released: 1993; Label: Hound; Format: Cassette
What's His Name? (Keith Frank)	Released: 1994; Label: Maison de Soul; Format: Cassette, CD
Movin' On Up! (Keith Frank)	Released: 1995; Label: Flat Town Music; Format: Cassette, CD
Only the Strong Survive (Keith Frank)	Released: July 20, 1996; Label: Maison de Soul; Format: Cassette, CD
You'd Be Surprised (Keith Frank)	Released: April 22, 1997; Label: Maison de Soul; Format: Cassette, CD
On a Mission (Keith Frank)	Released: July 21, 1998; Label: Maison de Soul; Format: Cassette, CD
Ready or Not (Keith Frank and the Soileau Zydeco Band)	Released: March 14, 2000; Label: Shanachie; Format: Cassette, CD
The Masked Band (The Creole Connection)	Released: February 27, 2001; Label: Louisiana Red Hot; Format: CD
Keith Frank (Keith Frank)	Released: January 29, 2002; Label: Maison de Soul; Format: CD
Going to See Keith Frank (Keith Frank and the Soileau Zydeco Band)	Released: December 13, 2005; Label: Soulwood; Format: CD
Loved. Feared. Respected. (Keith Frank)	Released: 2008; Label: Soulwood; Format: CD
Undisputed (Keith Frank and the Soileau Zydeco Band)	Released: May 26, 2009; Label: Soulwood; Format: CD
Follow the Leader (Keith Frank)	Released: 2012; Label: Soulwood
Return of the King (Keith Frank & the Soileau Zydeco Band)	Released: February 7, 2018; Format: CD
Legends of the South (Soulwood All-Stars)	Released: 2019; Label: Soulwood; Format: Digital streaming

=== Live albums ===
Title	Details
Live at Slim's Y-Ki-Ki (Keith Frank & The Soileau Zydeco Band)	Released: April 20, 1999; Label: Shanachie; Format: Cassette, CD
Live at Slim's Y-Ki-Ki, Vol. II (Keith Frank & The Soileau Zydeco Band)	Released: 2014; Label: Soulwood
One Night at Cowboy's (Keith Frank)	Released: 2017; Label: Soulwood; Format: CD
Live from Mamou, Vol. 1 (Keith Frank & The Soileau Zydeco Band)	Released: August 4, 2020; Label: Soulwood; Format: Digital Streaming

=== Singles ===
Title	Details
Haterz (feat. Lil Boosie)	Released: 2013; Label: Soulwood; Format: Digital streaming
Teddy Bear	Released: 2013; Label: Soulwood; Format: Digital streaming
And the Beat Goes	Released: 2024; Format: Digital streaming
