= Lynn August =

American zydeco accordionist (1948–2025)

Joseph Leonard August Jr. (August 7, 1948 – February 12, 2025), known professionally as Lynn August, was an American zydeco accordionist, keyboard player, singer and bandleader.

== Life and career ==
August was born in Lafayette, Louisiana on August 7, 1948. Though sometimes said to have been blind from birth, his own recollection is of having some sight until about the age of four. He attended the Louisiana State School for the Blind in Baton Rouge, and grew up listening to zydeco music, including that of his uncle Claude Duffy, an accordion player. He began playing drums and occasionally sang with Duffy's band, and at the age of 11 played percussion with the singer Esquerita, who suggested that he learn keyboards. He performed around New Orleans for about three years with Esquerita, who encouraged him to consider a solo career, and also played drums in the early 1960s with Stanley "Buckwheat" Dural.

As a pianist, Hammond organist and singer, August performed solo in clubs and restaurants, and recorded his first single, "Little Red Rooster," for the local Tamm label in 1966. For two years, he led a band in local clubs, until a bar brawl led to him returning to solo work in clubs around 1970. He also led a church choir. In 1978, he was recruited to play organ in accordionist Marcel Dugas' band. Recognizing the growing popularity of zydeco music, he bought an accordion and in the 1980s formed his own band, the Hot August Knights. He played shows and festivals, and recorded his first album, Zydeco Groove, in 1988. He released further albums on the Maison de Soul and Black Top labels in the early 1990s, including Creole Cruiser (1992) and Sauce Piquante (1993). A feature of his performances and recordings has been the adoption of the Creole style of "juré", with a cappella group singing, clapping and dancing, as recorded by Alan Lomax on his field recordings in the 1930s. He toured Europe in 1994.

In the mid-1990s, August formed his own company, Touch Tech, designing and selling computers for visually impaired people. He had open heart surgery in 1998, but continued to perform and record thereafter, releasing the album Legends Making Memories, with Willie-Tee Trahan and the band Cypress, in 2012. He died on February 12, 2025, at the age of 76.
