= Jeffery Broussard =

American zydeco musician

- Born: March 10, 1967 (age 59); Lafayette, Louisiana
- Genres: Zydeco
- Instruments: Accordion, vocals, bass, guitar, fiddle
- Label: Maison de Soul
- Member of: Jeffery Broussard and the Creole Cowboys
- Formerly of: Delton Broussard & the Lawtell Playboys; Clinton Broussard & The Zydeco Machines; Zydeco Force
- Website: creolecowboys.com

Jeffery Broussard (born March 10, 1967) is an American zydeco musician.

Broussard was born in Lafayette, Louisiana, to parents Ethel and Delton Broussard. He had five brothers and sisters, and he was the youngest child. During Jeffery's childhood, the family lived in Frilot Cove, near Opelousas, Louisiana, and his father worked as a sharecropper. Jeffery also worked much on the farm, leaving school after the seventh grade in order to help his family.

Jeffery Broussard's father was also an accomplished musician, and Jeffery was exposed to music early. His mother, Ethel, performed a cappella juré music at home. Broussard joined his father's band during childhood and went on to become a bandleader in his own right, first with musically innovative Zydeco Force, and then with Jeffery Broussard and the Creole Cowboys. One writer has described Broussard this way: he "wears his rural roots when he takes the stage. With his white-straw cowboy hat, silver-plated rodeo belt and black boots, it's as if he just jumped off a horse. He never removes his trademark toothpick from the corner of his mouth, even as he sings in a raspy, bluesy tenor and plays his single-row and triple-row accordions with fluttering triplets and melodic detours." Broussard has stated that Boozoo Chavis and—in contrast—his father are especially strong stylistic influences on his playing. Broussard has performed on a variety of instruments over the years, including drums, diatonic accordion, guitar, bass, and fiddle.

== Music career ==
Broussard began his performance career at eight years old by playing drums in his father's band, Delton Broussard and the Lawtell Playboys. He also played his father's accordion in secret as a child, until beginning to play accordion officially, and as his main instrument, during his teenage years. Regarding his choice of diatonic button accordion, Broussard has said in an interview, "I started playing on an old white piano accordion because it was the kind of music that Clifton Chenier had. But when [John] Delafose was playing that little single thing, they were going crazy over that. I started playing that, then I wouldn't give it up for nothing in the world. [Delafose's recording] 'Joe Pitre [à Deux Femmes],' that brought the single-note accordion back."

Broussard left his father's band to play drums with Terrance Simien. He then played bass in Roy Carrier's band. Broussard formed a new band, Zydeco Force, with bassist Robby "Mann" Robinson.

Zydeco Force became popular on the local trail ride scene and was known for several innovations, a style sometimes called "zydeco nouveau." One was "double-clutching," a technique of two rapid bass-drum kicks reminiscent of a heartbeat. The group also introduced choreographed steps, such as the "Zydeco Push" and "The Dip," to their shows. However, Zydeco Force never toured, because bassist Robby Robinson was unable to leave his work commitments. Zydeco Force released seven albums from 1990 to 2004, all with Maison de Soul: Zydeco Force, The Sun's Going Down, Shaggy Dog Two-Step, Zydeco Push, It's La La Time, You Mean the World to Me, and Rock Awhile! Z-Force Style.

In 1994, Broussard led a tribute band performance for his recently deceased father at the New Orleans Jazz & Heritage Festival.

In 2005, Broussard left Zydeco Force to form a more musically traditional band, Jeffery Broussard and the Creole Cowboys. Two years later, the band released their first album on the Maison de Soul label, Keeping the Tradition Alive!, which listeners noted as a return to a more traditional sound. According to one reviewer, "His 'new' sound falls squarely between Creole la-la and today’s nouveau variety." Regarding this traditional turn, Broussard said in an interview, "I'm a Creole person, a French African-American in Louisiana, and it's all about that tradition. I grew up in this culture, and my father played this music. We grew up on farms, riding horses and playing fiddles and accordions. Some people called it Creole music; some called it la-la, but it was how the music started out before it grew into zydeco and Cajun. I see the music changing a lot, getting more into hip-hop and rap, and I wanted to get back to the origins." Broussard also expressed concern at the loss of French among the younger generation of Zydeco musicians.

In 2012, Broussard participated in a cultural exchange tour to Russia, alongside Cajun group Balfa Toujours and Creole fiddler Ed Poullard, sponsored by the Library of Congress and CEC ArtsLink.

In 2022, Jeffery Broussard and the Creole Cowboys released Boots and Boujee, whose title track is a tribute to Broussard's wife, Millie. The album includes seven new compositions and production by Broussard's nephew, Koray Broussard.

Broussard has performed at festivals such as New Orleans Jazz & Heritage Festival, Festival International, Festivals Acadiens et Créoles, French Quarter Festival, Rhythm and Roots Festival the Louisiana Cajun–Zydeco Festival, Culture Campout, Bayou in the Butte Festival, and the Sugar Maple Music Festival.

== Awards and honors ==
=== C.R.E.O.L.E. Inc.'s Zydeco Music & Creole Heritage Awards ===
Year	Category	Result	Ref.
2007	Accordionist of the Year	Won	

=== Gambit's Big Easy Music Awards ===
Year	Category	Notes	Result	Ref.
2008	Best Zydeco	Jeffery Broussard and the Creole Cowboys	Nominated	
2010	Best Zydeco	Jeffery Broussard and the Creole Cowboys	Nominated	

=== OffBeat's Best of the Beat Awards ===
Year	Category	Work nominated	Result	Ref.
2008	Best Zydeco Album	Keeping the Tradition Alive! (Jeffery Broussard and the Creole Cowboys)	Won	

== Discography ==
=== With Zydeco Force ===
Zydeco Force (Zydeco Force)

- Released: 1990
- Format: LP
- Label: Maison de Soul 1031
- Tracks:
  - "I'm On My Way"
  - "Boo's Special"
  - "Song For My Father"
  - "Madeline"
  - "You Ain't Nothing But Fine"
  - "T-Beck Do, Both Sides of the Fence"
  - "Ugly Face"
  - "I Got Drunk"
  - "She Kicked Me Out"
  - "Just Because"
  - "Bernadette"

"Just Because" / "Do Watcha Wanna" (Zydeco Force)

- Released: 1990
- Format: Single
- Label: Maison de Soul 1061

The Sun's Going Down (Zydeco Force)

- Format: LP
- Label: Maison de Soul 1038
- Tracks:
  - "The Sun's Going Down"
  - "Zydeco Extravaganza"
  - "Zydeco Run"
  - "Zydeco Soldier (Buffalo Soldier)"
  - "Zydeco Slop"
  - "Do What You Wanta"
  - "Woe Bye"
  - "I'm Coming Back Home"
  - "Petite Ou La Gros"
  - "My Baby Left Me"
  - "Zydeco Force Theme Song"
  - "The First Time Ever I Saw Your Face"

Shaggy Dog Two-Step (Zydeco Force)

- Released: 1992
- Format: LP
- Label: Maison de Soul 1045
- Tracks:
  - "Double Clutching"
  - "I'm a Farmer"
  - "Forget About Me"
  - "Shaggy Dog Two Step"
  - "Shake That Thang"
  - "T-Boy Broussard"
  - "Oh, My Lucille"
  - "You Worry Me"
  - "B-Flat"
  - "Making a Mess Tonight"
  - "I Don't Like It"
  - "Pop That Zydeco Coochie"
  - "Zydeco Extravaganza"
  - "Zydeco Run"
  - "For the Good Times"

Zydeco Push (Zydeco Force)

- Released: 1994
- Format: LP
- Label: Maison de Soul 1048
- Tracks:
  - "Everyday Talk"
  - "Leave Me Alone"
  - "Big Dog, Lil' Dog"
  - "Twelve O'Clock Drunk"
  - "I'll Take You There"
  - "Zydeco Push"
  - "Roaches"
  - "Love Drip"
  - "Where'd You Get That Thing?"
  - "Electric Zydeco"
  - "I'm On A Wonder"
  - "12-String Boogie"
  - "Lonesome Waltz"
  - "Woe Bye"

It's La La Time (Zydeco Force)

- Released: 1995
- Format: LP
- Label: Maison de Soul 1054
- Tracks:
  - "Saul-O-Pree"
  - "I Don't Know"
  - "Shine"
  - "Why You Wanna Make Me Cry?"
  - "I Wonder Why"
  - "You For Me"
  - "Back to the Beginning"
  - "Broken Hearted"
  - "Paul's Playhouse"
  - "You Used to Call Me"
  - "Kush-Mal"
  - "Knock Knock"
  - "Boudin and Beer"
  - "Hoochie Coochie"

You Mean the World to Me (Zydeco Force)

- Released: 2001
- Format: LP
- Label: Maison de Soul 1078
- Tracks:
  - "101 Proof Zydeco"
  - "Stupid Little Things"
  - "Japanese Zydeco"
  - "You Mean the World to Me"
  - "Single Mom"
  - "Flash Back"
  - "Bow Legged Woman"
  - "Zydeco from 1988"
  - "Bye Bye for the Kings"
  - "Do the Mose and Amedee"
  - "Louisiana Bog Hog"
  - "You Stayed With Me"
  - "Bad Ass Dog"
  - "Show Off"
  - "Pu-Chum (Watu)"
  - "Take Time to Know Her"

Rock Awhile! Z-Force Style (Zydeco Force)

- Released: 2004
- Format: CD (ValueDisc)
- Label: Maison de Soul 7009
- Tracks:
  - "Body by Fisher"
  - "Going Back"
  - "Coming Through"
  - "Slippin' 3"
  - "Nellay"
  - "Fred G Zydeco"
  - "Act Like a Monkey"

=== With the Creole Cowboys ===
Keeping the Tradition Alive! (Jeffery Broussard and the Creole Cowboys)

- Released: 2007
- Format: CD
- Label: Maison de Soul 1087
- Tracks:
  - "Off Time Zydeco"
  - "Broussard Baisse Bas"
  - "Richest Man"
  - "Motor Dude Special"
  - "Oh Yé Yaille"
  - "My Baby Left Me"
  - "Creole Zydeco Hot Step"
  - "Dog Hill"
  - "Why You Wanna Make Me Cry"
  - "It Won’t Be Long"
  - "Oh Mom"
  - "My Baby Needs To Come Back Home"
  - "Tribute To Amedee"
  - "I Lost My Woman"
  - "Creole Cowboy Two Step"
  - "Johnny Billy Goat"
  - "Make It To Me"

Return of the Creole (Jeffery Broussard and the Creole Cowboys)

- Released: 2011
- Format: CD
- Label: Maison De Soul 1091
- Tracks:
  - "Tante Nana"
  - "Allons À Lafayette"
  - "I Love A Big Fat Women"
  - "Return Of The Creole"
  - "Tu Connaitre Ça Fait Mal (Oh You Know It Hurt)"
  - "Pinky's Heavenly Waltz"
  - "Prier Pour Moi (Pray For Me)"
  - "Old Carpenters Waltz"
  - "Madeleine"
  - "(Don't Pass Ya Hand On Dat...) Make It Hot"
  - "Zydeco Coteau"
  - "Hard To Stop"
  - "Last Dance Waltz"
  - "Ole Blue"
  - "Bring It On Home To Me"

Boots and Boujee (Jeffery Broussard and the Creole Cowboys)

- Released: 2022
- Format: CD
- Label: Maison de Soul 1103
- Producer: Koray Broussard
- Tracks:
  - "Josephine Is Not My Woman"
  - "Making Love In The Hen House"
  - "Cruising"
  - "Shaggy Dog Two-Step"
  - "Boots And Boujee"
  - "No Good Woman"
  - "Seychelles"
  - "Baby Please Don't Go"
  - "Dance And Show Off"
  - "It Won't Be Long"
  - "Tribute To Buckwheat"
  - "T-Blue And Nonc Joe"
  - "I Give Myself Away"
  - "Fred G. Zydeco"
  - "The Ballgame"
  - "Roaches"
  - "Awww Baby"
  - "What God Does"

=== Guest appearances ===
"I'm on the Wonder" (Sabertooth Swing feat. Jeffery Broussard, Ryan Hanseler) from the album Delta Bound

- Released: 2022
- Format: Single
- Label: Slammin Media
