= Only the Strong Survive (Keith Frank album) =

Studio album by Keith Frank
- Released: July 20, 1996
- Genre: Zydeco
- Length: 40:24
- Label: Maison de Soul

Professional ratings
Review scores
Source	Rating
AllMusic	3/5 stars
The Penguin Guide to Blues Recordings	2.5/4 stars

Only the Strong Survive is a studio album by the American zydeco musician Keith Frank. It was released in 1996.

== Track listing ==
All songs written by Keith Frank except "Sweet Soul Music"

1. "Let Me Be" – 2:45
2. "Make My Hustle" – 2:25
3. "Good Music (Sweet Soul Music)" – 3:13
4. "Reste Dans La Maison" – 2:16
5. "Bayou Boogie" (Instrumental) – 3:10
6. "Everywhere I Be" – 2:56
7. "Knee Cap Shuffle" – 2:50
8. "Steppin' to the Rhythm" – 2:38
9. "Good Old Days" – 2:54
10. "Only the Strong Survive" – 4:09
11. "There Goes My Baby" – 2:56
12. "Day-O" – 2:31
13. "Be Yourself" – 5:42

== Personnel ==
- Keith Frank – accordion, vocals
- Jennifer Frank – bass, backing vocals, lead vocals on "Only the Strong Survive"
- Brad Frank – drums
- George Attale – lead guitar
- Eric "Ice" Cole – rub board
