= Music of Louisiana =

The music of Louisiana can be divided into three general regions: rural south Louisiana, home to Creole Zydeco and Old French (now known as cajun music), New Orleans, and north Louisiana. The region in and around Greater New Orleans has a unique musical heritage tied to Dixieland jazz, blues, and Afro-Caribbean rhythms. The music of the northern portion of the state starting at Baton Rouge and reaching Shreveport has similarities to that of the rest of the US South.

== New Orleans (Traditional Genres) ==
In the 19th century, there was already a mixture of French, Spanish, African and Afro-Caribbean music. The city had a great love for Opera; many operatic works had their first performances in the New World in New Orleans.

=== Early African, Caribbean and Creole music ===
Unlike in the Protestant colonies of what would become the USA, African slaves and their descendants were not prohibited from performing their traditional music in New Orleans and the surrounding areas. The African slaves, many from the Caribbean islands, were allowed to gather on Sundays, their day off, on a plaza known as Congo Square. Permitted as early as 1817, dancing in New Orleans had been restricted to the square, which was a hotbed of musical fusion, as African styles from across America and the Caribbean met and danced in large groups, often in circle dances. The Congo Square gatherings became well known, and many whites came to watch and listen. Nevertheless, by 1830, opposition from whites in New Orleans and an influx of blacks from elsewhere in the U.S. caused the decline of Congo Square's prominence. The tradition of mass dances in Congo Square continued sporadically, though it came to have more in common with minstrelsy than with authentic African traditions.

Caribbean dances known to have been imported to Louisiana include the calenda, Congo, counjai, and bamboula.

Louis Gottschalk was an early 19th-century white Creole pianist and composer from New Orleans, the first American musician/composer to become famous in Europe. A number of his works incorporate rhythms and music he heard performed by African slaves.

In addition to the slave population, antebellum New Orleans also had a large population of free people of color, mostly Creoles of mixed African and European heritage who worked as tradesmen. The more prosperous Creoles sent their children to be educated in France. They had their own dance bands, an opera company, and a symphony orchestra. The community produced such composers as Edmund Dede and Basil Bares. After the American Civil War many Creole musicians became music teachers, teaching the use of European musical instruments to the newly freed slaves and their descendants.

=== Jazz ===
Probably the single most famous style of music to originate in the city was New Orleans jazz, also known as Dixieland. It came into being around 1900. Many with memories of the time said that the most important figure in the formation of the music was Papa Jack Laine who enlisted hundreds of musicians from all of the city's diverse ethnic groups and social status. Most of these musicians became instrumental in forming jazz music including Buddy Bolden, Bunk Johnson and the members of Original Dixieland Jazz Band. One of early rural blues, ragtime, and marching band music were combined with collective improvisation to create this new style of music. At first, the music was known by various names such as "hot music", "hot ragtime" and "ratty music"; the term "jazz" (early on often spelled "jass") did not become common until the 1910s. The early style was exemplified by the bands of such musicians as Freddie Keppard, Jelly Roll Morton, "King" Joe Oliver, Kid Ory. The next generation took the young art form into more daring and sophisticated directions, with such creative musical virtuosos as Louis Armstrong, Sidney Bechet, and Red Allen.

New Orleans was a regional Tin Pan Alley music composing and publishing center through the 1920s, and was also an important center of ragtime. Louis Prima demonstrated the versatility of the New Orleans tradition, taking a style rooted in traditional New Orleans jazz into swinging hot music popular into the rock and roll era. He is buried in New Orleans. Contemporary jazz has had a following in New Orleans with musicians such as Alvin Batiste and Ellis Marsalis. Some younger jazz virtuosos such as Wynton Marsalis and Nicholas Payton experiment with the avant garde while refusing to disregard the traditions of early jazz.

Continuing development of the traditional New Orleans jazz style, Tom McDermott, Evan Christopher, New Orleans Nightcrawlers.

Harry Connick Jr. was raised in New Orleans and attended Loyola University New Orleans.

=== New Orleans blues ===
The blues that developed in the 1940s and 1950s in and around the city of New Orleans was strongly influenced by jazz and incorporated Caribbean influences, it is dominated by piano and saxophone but has also produced major guitar bluesmen. Major figures in the genre include Professor Longhair and Guitar Slim, who both produced major regional, R&B and national hits. Louisiana blues created a specialized form of blues music sometimes using zydeco instrumentation and slow, tense rhythms that is closely related to New Orleans blues and swamp blues from Baton Rouge.

=== R&B/gospel ===
Allen Toussaint composed or produced many songs, including "Mother-in-Law", "I Like It Like That", "Fortune Teller", "Ride Your Pony", "Get Out of My Life, Woman", "Working in the Coal Mine", "Everything I Do Gonna Be Funky", "Freedom For the Stallion", "Yes We Can Can", and "Southern Nights". He was a producer for hundreds of recordings, for example "Right Place, Wrong Time", by his longtime friend Dr. John ("Mac" Rebennack), and "Lady Marmalade" by Labelle. The Meters, Lee Dorsey, Ernie K-Doe gained hit songs. New band Galactic released jazz funk album.

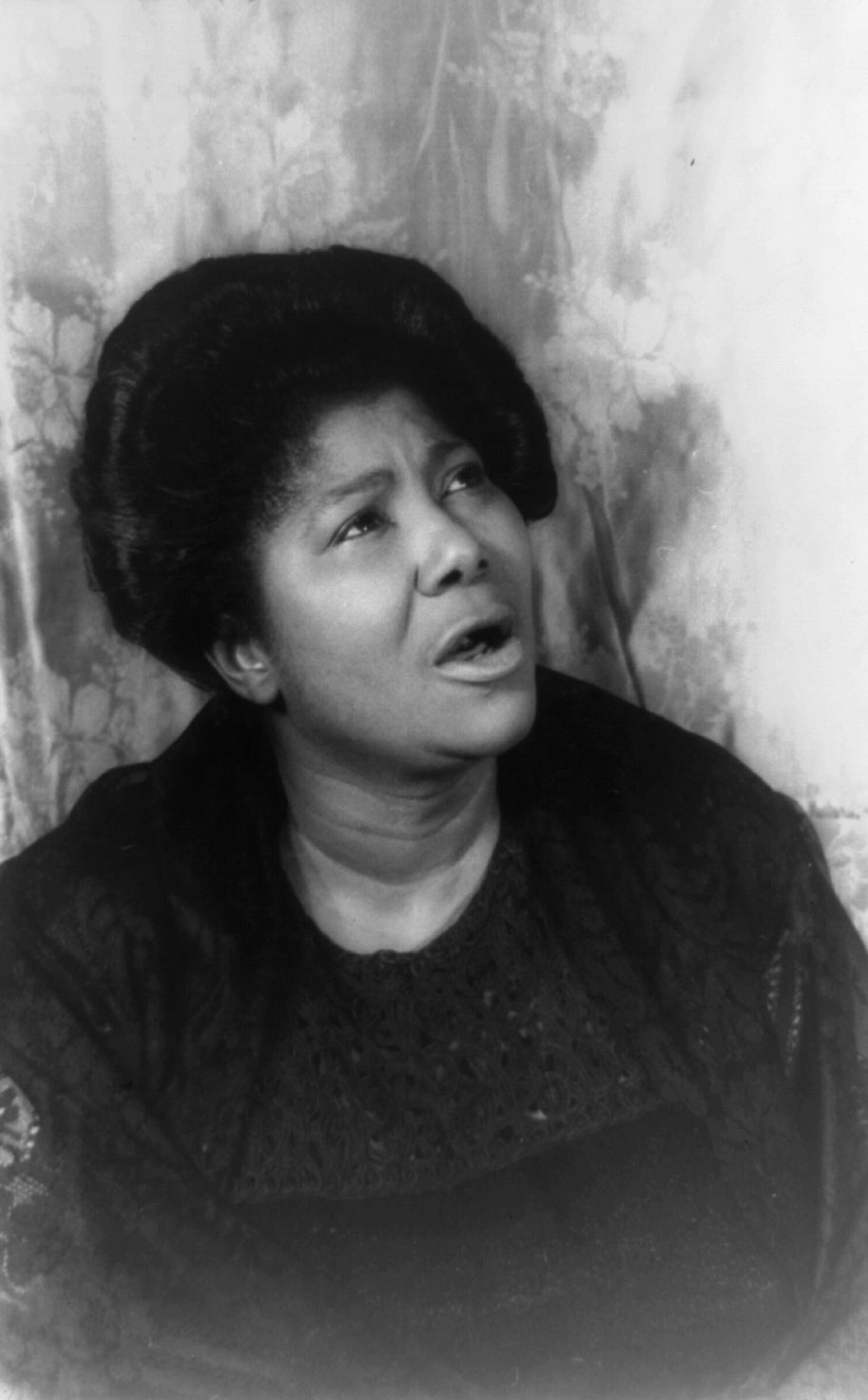
Mahalia Jackson

The city also has a rich tradition of gospel music and spirituals; Mahalia Jackson was the most famous of New Orleans' gospel singers. She is buried in Metairie.

The Dixie Cups had a #1 Hot 100 hit with "Chapel of Love" in 1964. They also recorded the song "Iko Iko" about Mardi Gras. In the 1950s, New Orleans again influenced the national music scene as a center in the development of rhythm and blues. Important artists included Fats Domino (d. 2017), Snooks Eaglin, Dave Bartholomew, Professor Longhair, and Huey "Piano" Smith.

Malcolm John "Mac" Rebennack, Jr. (born November 21, 1940), better known by the stage name Dr. John a New Orleans-born singer/songwriter, pianist and guitarist whose music combined blues, boogie woogie and rock and roll. Dr. John cited Professor Longhair as one of his musical influences and has recorded a number of his compositions, most notably "Tipitina".

1980s new style of "street beat" brass bands combining the jazz brass band tradition with funk and hip-hop was spearheaded by the Dirty Dozen Brass Band, then the Rebirth Brass Band.

== New Orleans (Modern Genres) ==
=== Rock/pop ===
Significant New Orleans rock band, and alternative bands include Zebra, The Radiators, Better Than Ezra (singer Kevin Griffin graduated from Louisiana State University in 1990), 12 Stones, and Cowboy Mouth. Popular alternative rock bands include Mutemath and Meriwether.

Louisiana is known as the most important place for the development of a style of heavy metal: sludge metal. Two of its founding acts, Eyehategod and Crowbar, are from New Orleans, where the genre's most important scene can be found. Other notable sludge metal bands such as Acid Bath, Down, Soilent Green and Choke are based in Louisiana. Blackened death metal band Goatwhore are from New Orleans.

Britney Spears (from Kentwood) has had four #1 hits on the Billboard Hot 100, including the dance-pop song "...Baby One More Time" from 1999. R&B singer Frank Ocean had a #1 album on the Billboard 200 with Blonde in 2016. Angelica Maria, born in New Orleans, spent her early childhood in Los Angeles before emigrating to Mexico, and is considered among the most successful Latin artists of all time.

=== Hip-hop ===
Beginning in the mid-1990s, New Orleans became a hub of Southern hip-hop. First with Master P and his No Limit clique based out of the 3rd Ward, then later came the Cash Money clique who popularized a unique semi-melodic Louisianian style of rapping to the hip-hop mainstream. The city has also been a center of Southern hip-hop, and the birthplace of mainstream Bounce music which originated in New Orleans.

The rapper Juvenile had a #1 hit on the Hot 100 with "Slow Motion" ft. Soulja Slim, from 2004 and a #1 album on the Billboard 200 with Reality Check in 2006. Lil Wayne became one of the most prominent New Orleans rappers in the mid-2000s. He has had two #1 hits on the Hot 100, including "Lollipop" from 2008.

== Southern region (Traditional Genres) ==
The music of rural south Louisiana features significant input from non-Creoles, most notably African Americans who are critical to the cultural/musical identity. Four main musical genres are indigenous to this area — Creole music (i.e. zydeco), swamp pop, and swamp blues. These historically-rooted genres, with unique rhythms and personalities, have been transformed with modern sounds and instruments. The southwestern and south central Louisiana areas herald many artists and songs that have become international hits, won Grammy awards, and become highly sought after by collectors.

In southwestern Louisiana in the 1800s, the fiddle was the most popular Cajun instrument and the music still carried clear influences from the Poitou region of France and the Scottish/Canadian influences of their earlier homeland. In the late 19th century German immigrants spreading outward from central and eastern Texas and New Orleans soon brought the accordion as well. Creoles at the time sang a rhythmic type of song called juré. When accordion, fiddle and the triangle iron were added later, the music evolved into French music or form la la, a central component of Creole music. La la was primarily rural, played at house dances also known as la las, and found in towns in the prairie regions like Mamou, Eunice and Opelousas.

In 1901 (see 1901 in music), oil was discovered at Jennings and immigration boomed. Many of the newcomers were white businessmen from outside of Louisiana who attempted to force the Creoles and Cajuns to adopt the dominant American cultural forms, even outlawing the use of the French language in 1916. Despite the law, many Creoles and Cajuns still spoke French at home, and musical performances were in French.

=== Creole music ===
The term "Creole music" is used to describe both the early folk or roots music traditions of French and Metis rural Creoles of South Louisiana and the later more contemporary genre called zydeco. It was often simply called French music or La La. It was sung in French patois by Creoles. This early American roots music evolved in the 1930s into a richer sound accompanied by more instruments. Creole pioneer Amédé Ardoin was the music's most influential figure and one of the earliest to make recordings, second only to the duo of Douglas Bellard and Kirby Riley. He has also been credited for greatly influencing the foundation of Cajun music. Creole music traditions in the US have been known to change and evolve as quickly as they were being replicated by white artists, the music of the Creoles also evolved into a more contemporary amplified sound that was later called zydeco, which is the indigenous music of the Creoles or "Creole music". Zydeco comes from French les haricots, meaning snap or green beans as in les haricots (ne) sont pas salés (the beans are not seasoned (with salt pork) because times are hard right now). Zydeco fused the traditional Creole roots music sung in French with contemporary sounds of blues and rhythm and blues making it relevant, dynamic and constantly attracting a new generation of listeners within the Creole community as well as outside the community. This fusion was birthed in the Creole la la, jazz and blues halls (joints) of Frenchtown, Houston, Texas which were frequented by Creole immigrants from southwestern Louisiana. Clifton Chenier, born near Opelousas, Louisiana, is regarded as the "King of Zydeco" and was largely responsible for defining and popularizing the genre in the mid- to late 1950s and 1960s.

=== Cajun music ===
Cajun music is rooted in the music of the preexisting Creoles and the French-speaking Catholics of eastern Canada and became transformed into a unique sound of the Cajun culture. In earlier years of the late 18th century the fiddle was the predominant instrument and the music tended to sound more like early country music. Cajun music is typically a waltz or two step. Unlike the folk music of Quebec, it is not associated with the Celtic tradition. Famous Cajun musicians were Lawrence Walker, Steve Riley and the Mamou Playboys, Aldus Roger, Marc Savoy, Wilson Savoy, Dewey Segura, Wayne Toups.

=== Zydeco ===
Early in the 1950s, zydeco evolved from the music of the Creoles in southwest and south central Louisiana. At an earlier period, Creole and Cajun music were more similar, but after World War II, this regional French music evolved into a distinct expression of the Creoles, Louisianians whose shared languages and culture transcend race. Along with the accordion, the second main instrument in a zydeco group is a corrugated metal washboard, called a Zydeco Rubboard or frottoir. They made the music contemporary by adding electrical instruments (guitar and bass), keyboards, drumkit and even sometimes horns. The Creole Zydeco music of Grammy-winning artists Queen Ida Guillory, Clifton Chenier, Rockin' Sidney Simien, Buckwheat Zydeco and Terrance Simien remain some of the most internationally recognized zydeco music. John Delafose, Andrus Espree (aka Beau Jocque), Boozoo Chavis, Rosie Ledet, Chubby Carrier, Canray Fontenot, Amédé Ardoin, Rockin' Dopsie, Geno Delafose, Nathan Williams, Keith Frank, Chris Ardoin, Nathan Williams Jr., J Paul Jr., Cedric Watson and Jeffery Broussard are also other well known zydeco musicians.

=== Swing Out ===
Swing out can be classified as a cross between the music genres of southwest Louisiana including Zydeco and Southern Soul. It is especially popular in the Acadiana region, being that so many artists originate and perform in this part of the state. Its popularity has caused an expansion of the music throughout the southern portion of the United States. Swing out music is usually produced and doesn't involve the use of live instruments unlike zydeco. Notable artists include Tucka James, Roi "Chip" Anthony, "Lysa" Harrington, and AudiYo.

=== Swamp blues ===
Swamp blues developed around Baton Rouge in the 1950s and reached a peak of popularity in the 1960s. It generally has a slow tempo and incorporates influences from other genres of music, particularly the regional styles of zydeco and Cajun music. Its most successful proponents included Slim Harpo and Lightnin' Slim, who enjoyed a number of rhythm and blues and national hits and whose work was frequently covered by bands of the British Invasion.

=== Swamp pop ===
Swamp pop came about in the mid-1950s. With the Cajun dance and musical conventions in mind, nationally popular African American music genres such as rock, pop, country, and R&B songs were re-recorded, sometimes in French. Swamp pop is more of a combination of many influences, and the bridge between zydeco, New Orleans second line, and rock and roll. The song structure is pure rock and roll, the rhythms are distinctly New Orleans based, the chord changes, vocals and inflections are R&B influenced, and the lyrics are sometimes French.

Clarence "Frogman" Henry's "(I Don't Know Why) But I Do" and "On Bended Knee" (both Bobby Charles compositions). Phil Phillips' gained big hit "Sea of Love". Swamp pop also left its imprint on the related but distinct genre known as "swamp blues", including Slim Harpo's classic "Rainin' in My Heart". Swamp blues/Swamp pop/Swamp R&B type songs such as the Cookie and the Cupcakes hit "Mathilda", Johnnie Allan's "Mathilda" and Dale & Grace "I'm Leaving up to You".

The Rolling Stones' covered Barbara Lynn's "You'll Lose a Good Thing" and "Oh Baby (We Got A Good Thing Goin')".

== Southern region (Modern Genres) ==
=== Country music ===
Sammy Kershaw, Eddy Raven, Jo-el Sonnier, and the band River Road are all Acadiana natives who went on to score national fame and sell millions of records via the major labels in Nashville.

=== Dance and Rave music ===
Southern Louisiana, especially around Lafayette had a significant rave scene in the late 1990s into the early 2000s. At its peak, dance-based DJ sets were featured most weekend evenings on KSMB and gained near-mainstream appeal. Local dance and rave scenes primarily centered on Florida breaks, and also incorporated trance music and occasionally mainstream house or other dance tracks as well. Notable DJs included DJ Trashy, DJ Digital, DJ Johnny Cage, and DJ Moon.

=== Hip-hop ===
Southern Louisiana has vibrant hip-hop scenes in most areas.

Baton Rouge, in particular, is home to a number of successful rappers, including Webbie, Boosie Badazz, and more recently, YoungBoy Never Broke Again, who had a #1 album in 2019.

== North Louisiana music ==
The region's location, bordered by Texas on the west and the Mississippi Delta on the east has not led to the development of "locally stylized" music. Traditional and modern country music has been dominant, creating its own country stars, like Tim McGraw, Jimmie Davis, Tony Joe White, and Andy Griggs from Northeast Louisiana, and Trace Adkins, Kix Brooks, and Hank Williams Jr. from Northwest Louisiana. Tim McGraw has had 25 songs that have reached #1 on the Hot Country Songs chart, including "Live Like You Were Dying" from 2004.

However, North Louisiana's lasting contribution to the world of popular music was the radio program The Louisiana Hayride, which started broadcasting in 1948 on KWKH in Shreveport. Hank Williams, George Jones, Johnny Cash, Elvis Presley and nearly every other country legend, or future country legend alive during the 1950s stepped on stage at the Shreveport Municipal Auditorium. They performed, many for the first time on radio, on a signal that covered much of the southeastern US. The original production of the show ended in 1960, but re-runs and the occasional special broadcast continued for a few years. The Louisiana Hayride was regarded as a stepping stone to The Grand Ole Opry, the legendary radio show from WSM in Nashville, Tennessee.

Northern Louisiana in the 1950s had a country rock scene, many of whose artists (such as the Lonesome Drifter) were recorded by local Ram Records. Later, Shreveport produced The Residents, Kenny Wayne Shepherd, and Sunday Mass Murder.

Shreveport native Danny Johnson assisted on the stages and recordings of Rod Stewart, Rick Derringer, Alice Cooper, and Alcatrazz. (Eddie Van Halens) Private Life, Danny Johnson and the Bandits, and Axis. He has been the guitar slinger for the last 16 years for Steppenwolf.

Jeff Mangum, the founder of Neutral Milk Hotel and a founding member of The Elephant 6 Recording Company was born in Ruston, Louisiana.

== Recordings ==
Small, local record labels proliferated from Houston, Texas to New Orleans, specializing in recording and distributing local acts. Labels such as Jin, Swallow, Maison de Soul, and Bayou continue to record and distribute Creole music, and other south Louisiana music. Many of the original versions of classic songs are still being made and distributed.

One of the most successful label owners was Floyd Soileau. Soileau started as a local DJ in Ville Platte, Louisiana in the mid-1950s, and soon decided he would rather help make music than play it. He started most of the labels listed in the previous paragraph. He and his record shop are important pieces of Louisiana's music history.

== See also ==
- Louisiana Music Hall of Fame in Baton Rouge
- List of songs about New Orleans
- Indigenous music of North America
- List of people related to Cajun music

== Bibliography ==
- Russell, Tony (1997). The Blues - From Robert Johnson to Robert Cray. Dubai: Carlton Books Limited. p. 157. ISBN 1-85868-255-X.
- Blush, Steven (2001). American Hardcore: A Tribal History. Los Angeles, CA: Feral House. ISBN 0-922915-71-7.
