= Ready or Not (Keith Frank album) =

Studio album by Keith Frank
- Released: March 14, 2000
- Recorded: 2000
- Genre: Zydeco
- Label: Shanachie

Professional ratings
Review scores
Source	Rating
The Penguin Guide to Blues Recordings	2.5/4 stars

Ready or Not is a studio album by Keith Frank released in 2000 on Shanachie records.

Ernest James labeled it one of his top fourteen Zydeco albums.

== Track listing ==
All songs were written by Keith Frank except "I Got Loaded", "I Done Got Over It", "Three Little Birds", "Walking on Sunshine", and the "Back to the 50s" medley.

1. "If Your Mama Don't Mind" – 3:27
2. "Soulwood Train" – 3:22
3. "Buck Bayou" – 4:45
4. "Never Met a Girl Like You" – 2:45
5. "I Got Loaded" (Peppermint Harris) – 3:44
6. "I Done Got Over It" (E. Jones) – 3:07
7. "What's My Extension" – 4:05
8. "Operator" – 3:36
9. "No Need to Worry / Three Little Birds" (Keith Frank / Bob Marley) – 4:59
10. "Walking on Sunshine" (Kimberley Rew) – 3:32
11. "Shining Star" – 3:59
12. "Back to the 50s: Why Do Fools Fall in Love / Blue Moon / Stay / A Teenager in Love" – 4:41
13. "You Can't Keep a Good Man Down" – 4:19
14. "Got to Get You into My Life" (not the Beatles song of the same name) – 4:12
15. "Ready or Not" – 4:46
16. "Soulwood Strut" – 3:19

== Credits ==
- Keith Frank – accordion, guitar, keyboards, vocals
- Jennifer Frank – bass, vocals
- Brad Frank – drums, vocals
- George Lee – guitar, vocals
- James "Chocolate" Ned – scrubboard, vocals
- Kent August – guitar on "Shining Star", "Ready or Not", and "Operator"
- Raoul Ceasar – backing vocals on "Back to the '50s"

== Sources ==
John Roos (June 22, 2000). "Striking Fresh Cajun Chords". The Los Angeles Times.
