= Hirte =

Hirte is a surname. Notable people with the surname include:

- Christian Hirte (born 23 May 1976), German lawyer and politician (CDU)
- Greg Hirte, American professional violinist, actor, and composer
- Heribert Hirte (born 31 March 1958), German legal scholar and politician (CDU)
- Klaus Hirte (28 December 1937 – 15 August 2002), German operatic baritone
