= Roy Carrier =

- Born: Joseph Roy Carrier; February 11, 1947
- Origin: Lawtell, Louisiana, United States
- Died: May 3, 2010 (aged 63)
- Genres: Zydeco
- Occupation: Musician
- Instrument: Accordion
- Years active: 1953–2010
- Formerly of: The Night Rockers
- Website: www.roycarrier.com

Joseph Roy Carrier Sr. (February 11, 1947 – May 3, 2010), known professionally as Roy Carrier, was an American Zydeco musician. He was the father of Chubby and Dikki Du Carrier, who followed their father into Zydeco music and the brother of Zydeco T Carrier

== Early years ==
Roy Carrier was born February 11, 1947, in rural Louisiana near Lawtell, one of 10 children in a sharecropping family. Carrier's father Warren, himself a Zydeco musician, would play the accordion on weekends at parties and la la dances. When Carrier was 6 years old, he began to accompany his father to these events, and would play along with him on the frottoir, or "rubboard". He continued this for several years, moving to drums and then to guitar.

His desire, however, was always to play the accordion like his father, and he would secretly practice on his father's accordion when Warren was away, risking a beating when he was caught. His father soon recognized his skill with the instrument and would then allow him to freely practice.

Carrier formed his first band in 1961, at the age of 14, with himself on guitar, a brother on drums, his uncle on the rubboard, and a local accordion player named Chris Johnson. The band was named The Night Rockers, and was the first version of the band that Carrier would continue to use throughout his life. Most of them being underage, the band could not play the local bars, but did play many parish dances.

Carrier would watch and learn from Johnson's accordion play, and continued to practice. After a year, Johnson left the band and Carrier prepared to take over the lead. However, around this time he lost most of his right index finger in a farming accident, preventing him from taking up the accordion, and impacting his guitar play for several years.

== Career ==
At the age of 17, Carrier returned to the accordion. Since he was now lacking the use of his right index finger, he had to develop a new method of play, known as "crossing chords" or "cross-chording" to achieve the sounds that the missing finger would normally produce. In 1965, he re-formed the Night Rockers band, with himself fronting the group on accordion, and Lawrence Chavis taking over Carrier's old position on guitar, and played the local bars and nightclubs around the area.

In 1972, the 25-year-old Carrier gave up farming and took a job as an offshore oil worker. The job's work schedule was 7 days on the rig, followed by 7 days off, during which time he would continue to practice and play shows with his band. He would spend the next 16 years at this job.

Carrier had saved enough money while working the rigs that in 1980 he was able to purchase a small local club in Lawtell, which he named The Offshore Lounge. The club became a place for local Zydeco musicians to meet each other, and practice their skills together in "jam sessions" on Thursdays, which became a regular feature of the club.

During this era, Carrier used his club to encourage the development of Zydeco music in the area, and was instrumental in the early careers of many later well-known Zydeco musicians. Geno Delafose and Beau Jocque, among others, played the club early in their careers, Delafose getting his first paying performance from Carrier. Bassist Robby Robinson, later to form Zydeco Force, began as a member of Carrier's band, and Carrier later lent the band equipment to get them started. Carrier's sons Chubby and Troy, as their father had done before, began playing with the Night Rockers by the time they were 10 years old.

In 1989, Carrier quit the offshore work and, with the encouragement of Chubby, began touring with the Night Rockers outside of Louisiana.

Roy Carrier is regarded as a teacher of nearly an entire generation of musicians. As such that generation made sure that Big Daddy Roy was part of the inaugural Zydeco Hall of Fame class alongside Clifton Chenier and Boozoo Chavis. In 2020 Smithsonian Folkways acquired Right on Rhythm, the label that Roy recorded on. They issued an additional CD, Choose Your Shoes. Originally it was created for Roy to sell from the stage on what turned out to be his last road trip to the East Coast. The music was culled from live tapes that created earlier CDs. As far as being a school in old school Zydeco, there aren't many that can touch it.

== Death ==
He died at age 63 in 2010 and was funeralized at Holy Family Catholic Church, in Lawtell, Louisiana.

== Discography ==
- Zydeco Strokin (Paula Records, 1995)
- Soulful Side of Zydeco (Zane Records, 1995)
- Roy Carrier at His Best (Zane Records, 1995)
- Nasty Girls (Right on Rhythm, 1996)
- Twist and Shout (Right on Rhythm, 1998)
- Offshore Blues & Zydeco (Right on Rhythm, 2000)
- Whiskey Drinkin' Man (Right on Rhythm, 2001)
- Living Legend (Severn Records, 2004)
- Zydeco Soul (Mardi Gras, 2006)
