= Only the Strong Survive =

Only the Strong Survive may refer to:

- "Only the Strong Survive" (song), a song by Jerry Butler
- Only the Strong Survive (Bruce Springsteen album), an album by Bruce Springsteen
- Only the Strong Survive (Keith Frank album), an album by Keith Frank
- Only the Strong Survive, an album by Billy Paul
- Only the Strong Survive, a 1998 compilation album by REO Speedwagon
- Only the Strong Survive, a song by REO Speedwagon from Nine Lives
- Only the Strong Survive, a song by Gary Richrath from Only The Strong Survive
- Only the Strong Survive, a song by Bryan Adams from Into the Fire
- Only the Strong Survive, a song by Raven from Life's a Bitch
- Only the Strong Survive, a song by Laura Marling from Song for Our Daughter
- Only the Strong Survive, a 1995 film starring Cynthia Khan
- Only the Strong Survive, a 2002 documentary by D. A. Pennebaker
- "Only the Strong Survive", a song by Stuck Mojo from Pigwalk (1996)

== See also ==
- Only the Strong
