= What's His Name? =

Studio album by Keith Frank
- Released: 1994
- Length: 54:32
- Label: Maison de Soul

Keith Frank chronology
| What's His Name? (1994) | Movin' on Up! (1995) |

What's His Name? is the debut album by Keith Frank and the Soileau Zydeco Band. It was released in 1994. The title track was a minor hit.

== Critical reception ==
Professional ratings
Review scores
| Source | Rating |
|---|---|
| AllMusic | 4/5 stars |
| The Penguin Guide to Blues Recordings | 3/4 stars |

The Washington Post wrote that Frank "emphasizes the kind of hypnotic two-step stomps popularized by Beau Jocque and Boozoo Chavis."

== Track listing ==
All songs written by Keith Frank except when noted.

1. "What's His Name?" – 3:15
2. "Silly Puddin" – 3:30
3. "Motor Dude Special" – 5:13 (Boozoo Chavis)
4. "Feels So Bad" – 5:41 (Little Milton)
5. "One Shot" – 3:58
6. "Dr. Jim" – 2:29
7. "Get on Boy" – 4:32
8. "Rainbow" – 5:41 (Curtis Mayfield)
9. "Mr. Frank" – 2:43
10. "On the Rise" – 3:09
11. "Sweet Pea" – 3:50
12. "Murdock (Zydeco Heehaw)" – 3:37 (Boozoo Chavis)
13. "Everybody Get Up!" – 4:08
14. "At the Trail Ride" – 2:54

== Credits ==
- Keith Frank – accordion, vocals
- Jennifer Frank – bass guitar, backing vocals
- Brad Paul Frank – drums
- George Attale – guitar
- Nathaniel Fontenot - guitar
- James "Chocolate" Ned – vest frottoir (rub board)
