= Mojo & The Bayou Gypsies =

Band from Louisiana, United States

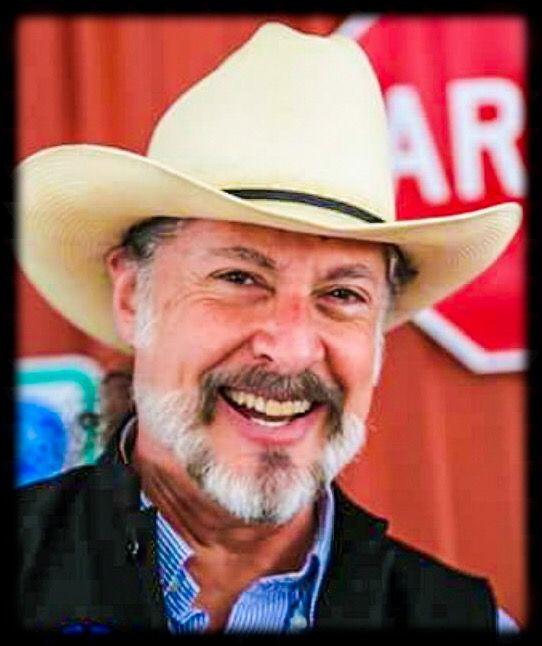

Background information
- Origin: Louisiana
- Genres: Zydeco, Cajun
- Years active: 1982–present
- Members: Mojo; Zydeco T Carrier; Katie Andrick; Tee John Moser; Mike Dennie
- Website: redhotmojo.com

Mojo & The Bayou Gypsies is a band led by Mojo from Breaux Bridge Louisiana. Their music is a blend of zydeco, Cajun and their particular style which he calls Red Hot Mojo Music. Circa 2018, they consist of Mojo on vocals and Cajun accordion, Zydeco T Carrier on Frottoir, Greg Hirte on Cajun fiddle, Tee John Moser on drums, and Beau Brian Burke on bass.

== Genre and musical style ==
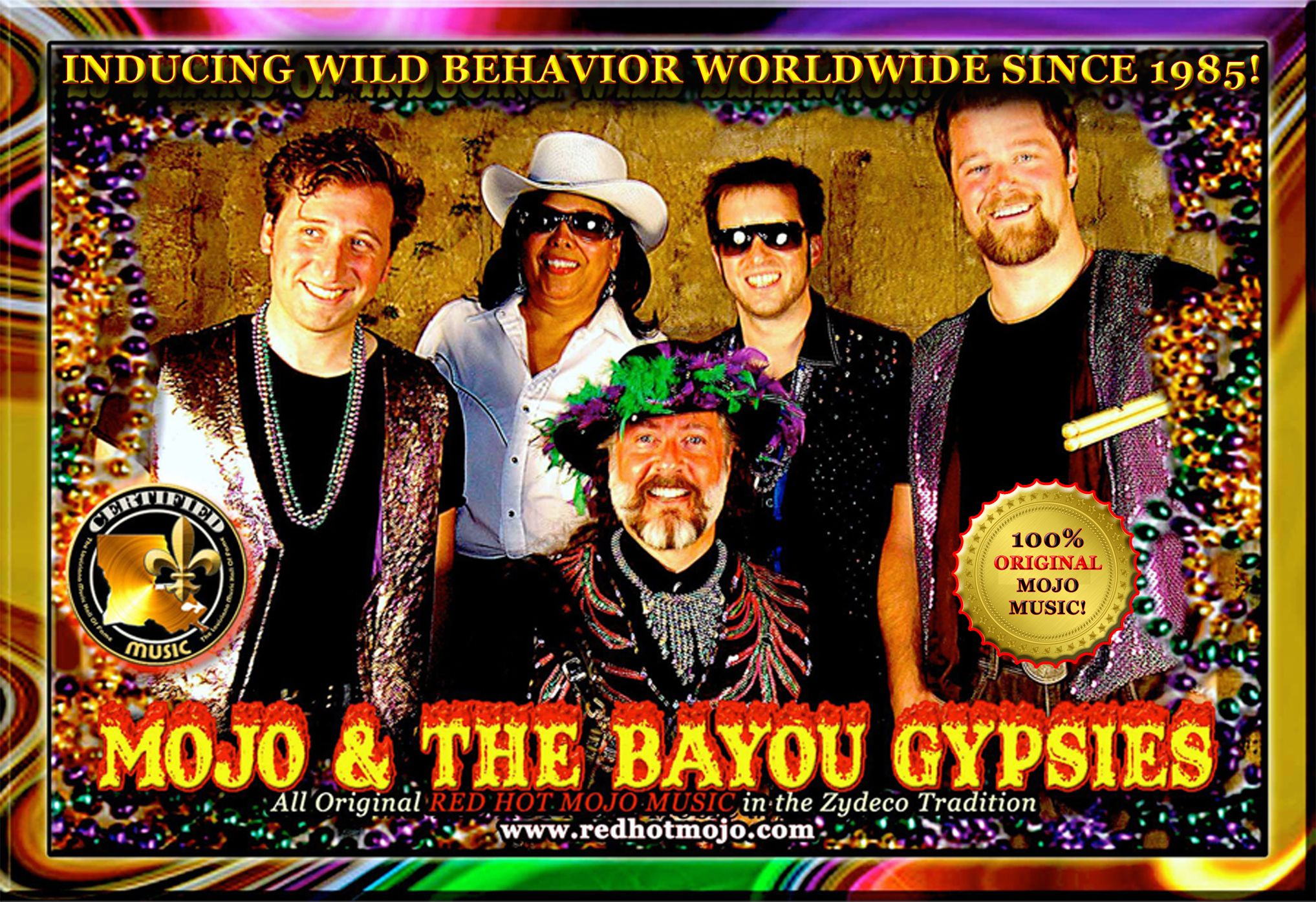
Mojo and the Bayou Gypsies. From left: Greg Hirte, T. Carrier, Mojo, Beau Brian Burke & Tee John Moser

Most classifications of their genre include zydeco and Cajun. "His music reflects the Louisiana and Cajun zydeco tradition, as well as New Orleans two-steps, rock & roll and blues rhythms". Other writers describe their music as "a musical mélange of Cajun, zydeco, rock and blues". and coming those styles in a "gleeful gumbo that he calls Red Hot Mojo Music..." His performances are characterized as energetic and charismatic. "...from the way he moves, it's obvious that he's still excited about what he's doing." With Zydeco and Cajun genres being closely associated with Louisiana culture, many of their performances during that time of the year have Mardi Gras themes.

== Documentary ==
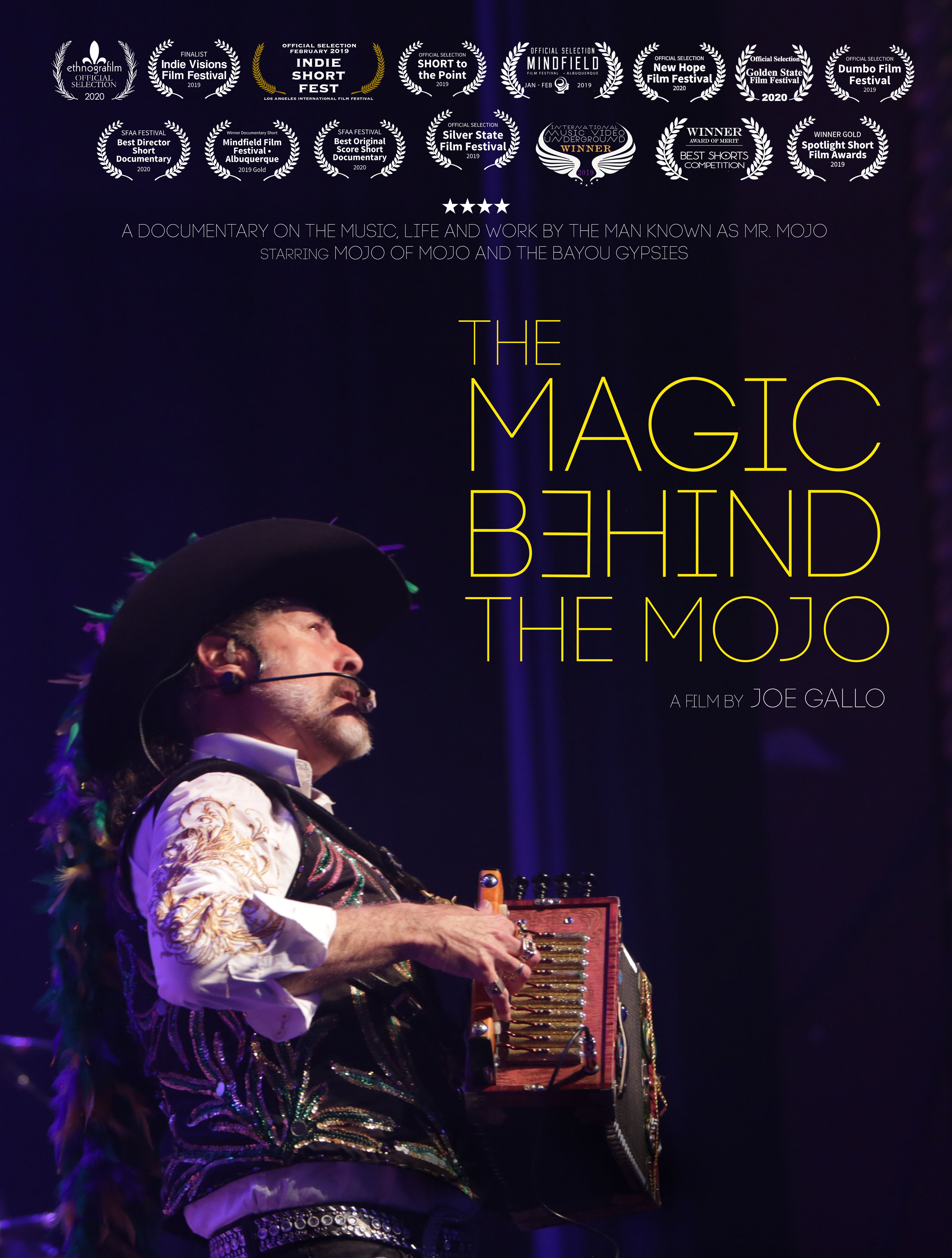
Mojo documentary

Filmmaker Joe Gallo has produced a documentary on Mojo titled "The Magic Behind the Mojo" According to Gallo, "I discovered his music searching for a soundtrack for 10 'Soldier Story' mini-documentaries created to engage support of the creation of a National Museum of the US Army. These stories of Army combat veterans were impactful and emotional and Mojo's composition 'Lights on the Bayou', a beautiful and haunting ballad in the Cajun style, was the perfect fit. This introduced me to Mojo and the discovery that there is more to his music and more to the man than his cajun accordion. This documentary looks into the making of a man who gives something everyday, lives life to the fullest, and all his friends are friends for life." When asked in a CBS "Great Day Washington" CBS television show interview at what point in the filming of the first project Gallo realized that Mr. Mojo is a movie in himself, Gallo said "Probably sometime during the first day of filming". The Mojo documentary project took approximately 2 years and was completed in the summer of 2018. It won various film festival awards.

The documentary was released at the first public screening November 13, 2018 at the USO Warrior and Family Center at Ft. Belvoir, VA, the future site of the National Museum of the US Army slated for opening in 2019.

Gallo's ten mini-documentaries are archived at the Army Historical Foundation.

== Mojo ==
Mojo is the vocalist, accordion player, songwriter, and a sort of "father figure" leader of Mojo & The Bayou Gypsies. He lives in Southwest Louisiana, outside of Breaux Bridge. "Mojo" is the only name he uses. When asked about his longer legal name he has said that "only the IRS and the police" know it. Mojo has been performing zydeco and Cajun music since 1974.

In collaboration with Frottoir maker Tee Don Landry, Mojo got the Frottoir (the zydeco washboard) inducted into the Smithsonian Institution Museum of North American History Folk Music collection. He's also an actor appearing regularly on CMT's TV show Swamp Pawn based in the Louisiana bayous and the star of the TV show Swamp Girls Gone Crazy which is about successful women entrepreneurs in that part of the country. Mojo also serves on the board of directors of NAPAMA (North American Performing Arts Managers and Agents) and is an International Music Ambassador for the State of Louisiana.

Charitable work has been a significant element for both the band and Mojo. "A portion of proceeds from every MOJO concert is donated to charity. And his work to benefit children is legendary. Mojo and his band deliver hundreds of performances each year to inner-city, underprivileged, and handicapped children." He is a recipient of three Shriners Hospitals for Children Humanitarian Awards.

=== Early years ===
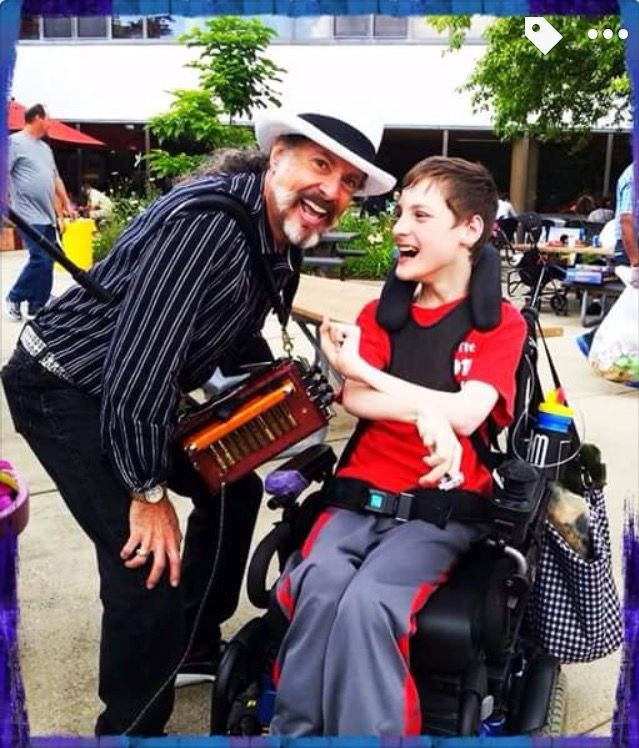
Mojo At Shriners Hospital

Mojo's first “performance” was when he was about three years old in front of a family gathering, imitating Elvis Presley and banging on a skillet for a guitar. By age 11 he had performed professionally. Mojo recounts "It was always important to express what was inside of me because I could never hold it in. This caused some interesting problems for me in school. But my mama always said "Thank God those teachers never helped you be normal or you could never make a living."" He recounted that she said that he "was able to turn a behavior problem into a career. The band started as an acoustic duo in the early 1980s. Then, in approximately 1985 they added a bass player followed by Mojo beginning to play accordion in the band.

=== Recent ===
Circa 2019, the band has been performing for 34 years. As Mojo described in a CBS 2018 "Great Day Washington" television show interview, "We're on our second generation of band members.....our newest member has been with us 16 years" His accordion was custom-made for him by Larry Miller in Iota Louisiana.

=== Recent awards ===
In May 2022, Mojo won an award from the National Association of the Performing Arts, their Liz Silverstein award for agent/manager of the year.

=== Musical philosophy ===
Mojo cites a statement by Buckwheat Zydeco to his daughter "The talent you have is a gift from God. But it's not for you, it's to make other people happy" and says that they have lived by those words.

== Other band members ==
Circa 2024, they consist of Mojo on vocals and Cajun accordion, Zydeco T Carrier on Frottoir (washboard), Katie Andrick on Cajun fiddle, Tee John Moser on drums and Mike "nuke" Dennie, on bass. Moser joined the band in 1995, Burke in 2000. Circa 1996 the band size had varied between six and nine performers. In earlier years his daughters performed with the band. Circa 1996 this included Marcy on fiddle and T'Pech on washboard. Chicago blues musician Lonnie Brooks, praised the talents of "Fiddlin' Marcy". "I'm real impressed with her," he said. "I think she's great. And the music they play always brings back memories of home for me."

=== Zydeco T Carrier, Frottoir ===
Zydeco T Carrier joined the band in 1989 and plays the washboard. According to an ABC news article she is a "legend known for her skill as a player of the Frottoir...", She is a native of Church Point, LA. Carrier is a French-speaking Creole from the well known zydeco Carrier family. Her brother is the late Roy Carrier, her nephew is Chubby Carrier, both known as zydeco musicians.

=== John Paul Moser, Drums ===
Tee John Paul Moser joined the band in 1995. He has performed in a variety of other areas including on 30 television and radio commercials. He toured and performed with Tito Puente, "Blue" Lou Marini (Blues Brothers), Clark Terry (Johnny Carson Show), Louie Bellson and Tito Corillio. He also acts in feature films and music videos.

== Previous band members ==
=== Greg "The Fire" Hirte, Fiddle ===
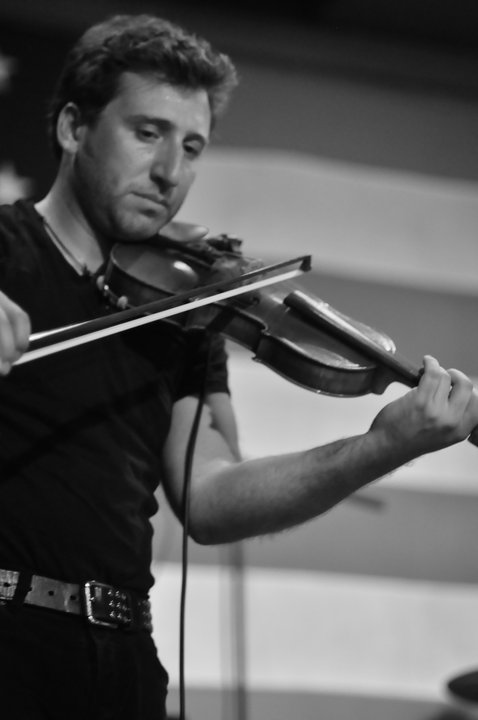
Greg Hirte

Greg Hirte is a classically trained violinist and actor. He started playing violin at age four. Prior to joining Mojo & The Bayou Gypsies in 2002 he performed with Billy Corgan, Nick Tremulus, Steve Earl and Ronnie Specter. Circa 2020, with 18 years with the band, he was its newest member. Hirte is a Joseph Jefferson award winner, and a veteran of the Goodman Theater stage, playing their featured actor in their production of Dickens' Christmas Carol for over 20 years.

=== Beau Brian Burke, Bass ===
Burke joined the band in 2000. With a master's degree in Jazz Bass performance, he has performed with artists from a variety of genres including blues artists, Irish music artists, jazz and fusion artists, and as an actor "John Paul Jones" in a Led Zeppelin tribute production.

=== Other previous band members ===
- Ed Kaiser (Original Member, Bass)
- Kevin "The Drummer" Krall (Original Member, Drums)
- Fiddlin' Marcy (Original Member, Fiddle)
- T'Peche (Original Member, Frottoir, Keyboards)
- Hollywood Mike Houtz (Original Member, Guitar)
- Harlan Terson (Bass)
- Rich Halajian (Fiddle/Violin)

== Performances ==
=== Television performances ===
Mojo has performed on the PBS, ABC, CBS, NBC and Fox television networks and the superstation WGN.

=== Netherlands International Cajun & Zydeco Festival ===
In May 2011 they headlined the Netherlands International Cajun & Zydeco Festival. This was the 19th annual edition of this festival and was held in May 2011 in Raamsdonksveer, Netherlands.

=== Unusual venues ===
He has performed in opera houses, vaudeville houses and stages in front of the Canadian Parliament.

== Discography ==
Mojo has produced about 25 albums. Some of them are:

- Rock the House Tonight! 2001
- Mojo & The Bayou Gypsies Madame Magique
- Better Get Ready... Mojo's In Town! January 2006
- Better On the Bayou August 2008
- From the Bayou to the Black Forest! (Recorded live in Germany) June 2009
- 25 Years of inducing wild behavior December 2010
- Mojo and the Bayou Gypsies Madam Magique
- Lagniappe! Ala Mojo February 2017

Mojo explained that ""Lagniappe" is a Cajun word for a little something extra. Like if you order a slice of pie and they give you a scoop of ice cream for free. I put out that album in 2017. On that album are songs that are no longer in the show but people request all of the time" 15 of their albums have been certified by the Louisiana Music Hall of Fame.
