= Only the Strong =

Only the Strong may refer to:

- Only the Strong (film), a 1993 action film
- Only the Strong (Big Noyd album), 2003
- Only the Strong (Thor album), 1985

See also:

- Only the Strong Survive
