= Vest frottoir =

Percussion instrument used in zydeco music

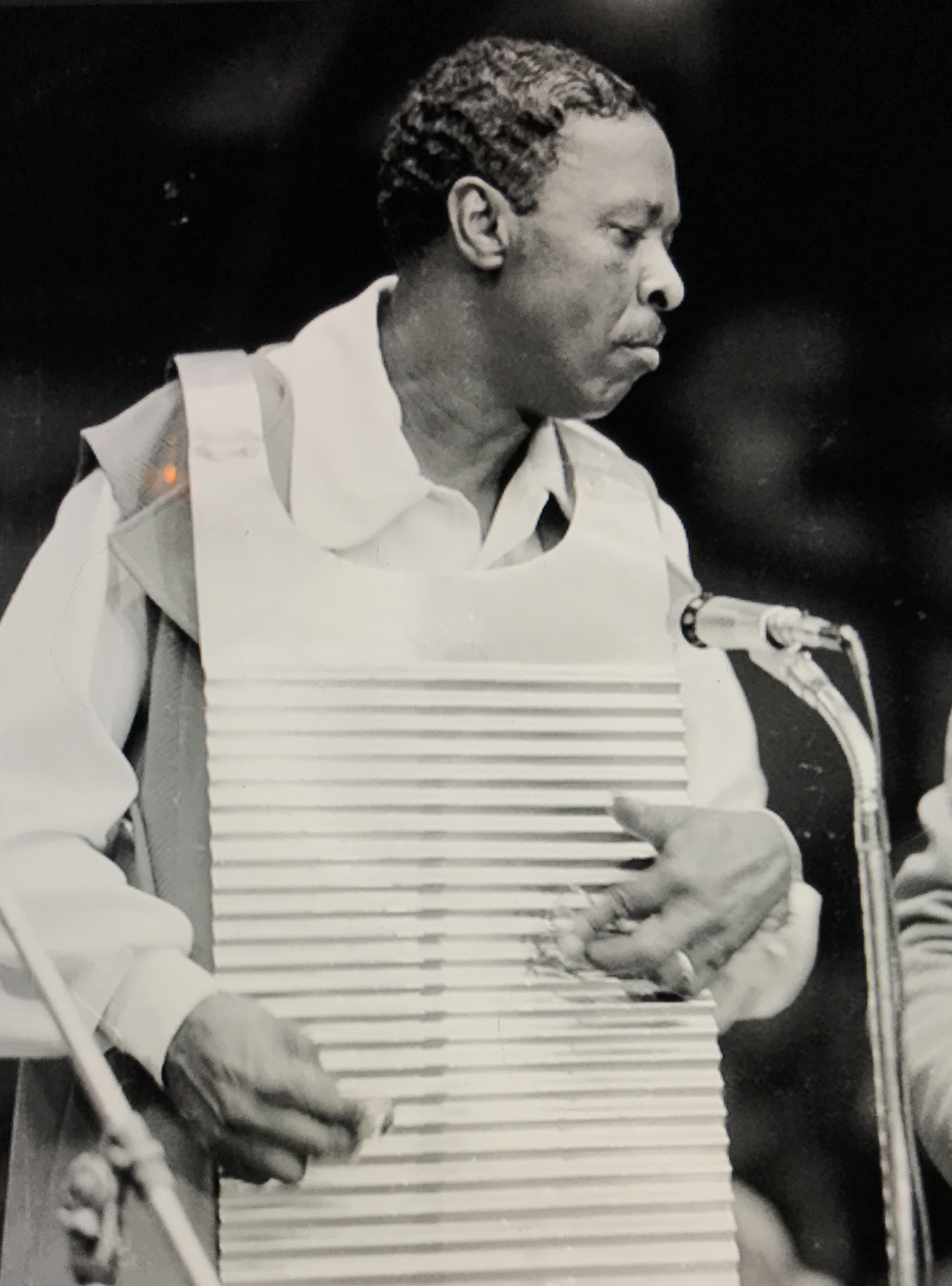
A zydeco musician wearing a vest frottoir.

A vest frottoir or vest rubboard is a percussion instrument used in zydeco music similar to a washboard. It is usually made from pressed, corrugated stainless steel and is worn over the shoulders.

It is played as a rhythm instrument by being stroked downward with either bottle openers or spoons. Many of these instruments are homemade, but Don Landry of Louisiana is one professional maker, making them for Clifton Chenier's band and Elvis Fontenot and the Sugar Bees, amongst others.

In The Amazing Race 32, racers played the vest frottoir during the season's final leg in New Orleans.

== History ==
The first zydeco vest frottoir was designed by Clifton Chenier in 1946 while he and his brother Cleveland were working at an oil refinery in Port Arthur, Texas. Chenier commissioned the instrument from Willie Landry, a welder-fabricator who worked at the same refinery. Landry's original frottoir is held in the permanent collection of the Smithsonian Institution.
