= La Chanson Perdue =

Studio album by Geno Delafose
- Released: 1998
- Studios: Ultrasonic, New Orleans
- Label: Rounder
- Producer: Scott Billington

Geno Delafose chronology
That's What I'm Talkin' About! (1996)	La Chanson Perdue (1998)	Everybody's Dancin' (2003)

La Chanson Perdue is an album by the American musician Geno Delafose, released in 1998. He is credited with his band, French Rockin' Boogie. Delafose considered the album to be a combination of Creole zydeco and Cajun music; however, the title of the album ("The Lost Song") in part refers to the popularity of zydeco overtaking traditional Creole music. Delafose supported the album with a North American tour.

== Production ==
Recorded at Ultrasonic Studios, New Orleans, the album was produced by Scott Billington. Delafose switched between piano accordion and diatonic button accordion. Most of the songs are sung in French. Christine Balfa played acoustic guitar on several songs; Dirk Powell played fiddle.

== Critical reception ==
Professional ratings
Review scores
Source	Rating
AllMusic	4.5/5 stars
The Baltimore Sun	3.5/4 stars
MusicHound World: The Essential Album Guide	5/5 stars
Orlando Sentinel	4/5 stars
The Penguin Guide to Blues Recordings	4/4 stars

The Province deemed the album "edgy and raw with all the moonshine-fuelled fire of a jam session at a back-porch crawfish boil." The Orlando Sentinel noted that "Delafose is not a commanding singer, but his simple, unadorned vocals are full of the restrained longing that infuses the old Cajun and Creole tunes."

The Baltimore Sun wrote that, "in Creole and Cajun French, accordionist Delafose pines away for lost love, launches lilting waltzes and kicks back with an irresistible dance beat." The Wall Street Journal determined that Delafose, "perhaps zydeco's ultimate neo-traditionalist, borrows heavily from the Cajun repertoire and forges a distinctive approach that is at once rhythmic and romantic."

== Track listing ==
No.	Title	Length
1.	"Je Va's Jamais la Voir Encore (I'll Never See Her Again)"
2.	"Bernadette"
3.	"'Tite Monde (Little One)"
4.	"Bon Soir Moreau (Goodnight Moreau)"
5.	"Chère Ici, Chère là Bas (Dear One Here, Dear One There)"
6.	"La Chanson Perdue (The Lost Song)"
7.	"Une Autre Soir Ennuyante (Another Night Without You)"
8.	"Mon Vrai Amour (My True Love)"
9.	"Bayou Pon Pon"
10.	"I Want It All"
11.	"Double D Two Step"
12.	"Valse de Opelousas (Opelousas Waltz)"
13.	"'Quo Faire/Jolie Bassette (What to Do?/Pretty Bassette)"
14.	"'Tits Yeux Noirs (Little Dark Eyes)"
15.	"Save the Last Dance for Me"
