= Greg Hirte =

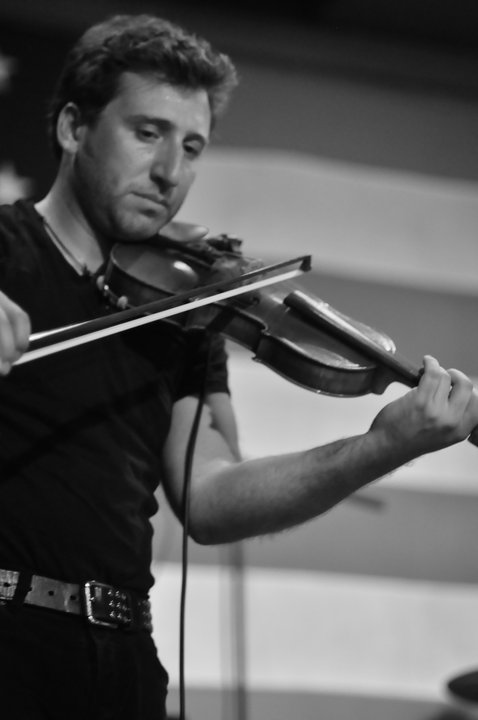
Playing in 2012

Greg Hirte is a professional violinist, actor, and composer based out of Chicago, Illinois.

He performs with a handful of bands, including Mucca Pazza, The Flashbulb, Golden Horse Ranch Band, Gin Palace Jesters, Can Ky Ree, Mojo & The Bayou Gypsies and formerly with Soundframe. His violin performances have also appeared on many albums, most notably The Flashbulb's "Kirlian Selections", "Réunion" and "Soundtrack To A Vacant Life".

Hirte is an actor, musician, and composer based in Los Angeles and Chicago. In 2020, he appeared at Lookingglass Theatre in The Steadfast Tin Soldier. The Steafast Tin Soldier production has been called a "a triumph in creativity and imagination". Before that, he performed in Treasure Island.

His recent theater credits include his 19th season with the Goodman Theatre’s A Christmas Carol, portraying Leon in Hank Williams: Lost Highway (American Blues Theater), and Luther in Ring of Fire: The Music of Johnny Cash. Additional Chicago credits include performances and musical compositions for the Goodman Theatre, Chicago Shakespeare Theater, Court Theatre, Drury Lane Theatre, Victory Gardens Theater, and Piven Theatre Workshop. For the latter, he earned a Jeff Award nomination for Best Original Score for Sarah Ruhl’s Melancholy Play.

Hirte has also performed at various international theater and music festivals and is a member of several local and national bands.
