= Maison de Soul =

American zydeco record label

- Founded: 1974
- Founder: Floyd Soileau
- Genre: Zydeco; blues; New Orleans R&B
- Country of origin: U.S.
- Location: Ville Platte, Louisiana
- Official website: www.flattownmusic.com

Maison de Soul is a Louisiana-based zydeco and blues record label. It was founded in 1974 in Ville Platte, Louisiana by Floyd Soileau and remains under his ownership. It is one of four record labels under Soileau's Flat Town Music Company umbrella, and combined the Flat Town labels make up "the largest body of Cajun, zydeco, and swamp music in the world". Living Blues magazine has called Maison de Soul "the country's foremost zydeco label".

== Founding ==
By 1974, Floyd Soileau had already established two other record labels, Jin Records and Swallow Records. Maison de Soul was founded in 1974 after a conversation between Soileau and zydeco star Clifton Chenier. Chenier had just finished recording a 1950s style album, when he shook his finger at Soileau and said "You know, Floyd Soileau, zydeco is where it's at. It's coming on strong, and you better get with it." Soileau took Chenier's advice and founded Maison de Soul, which was the first record label dedicated to producing zydeco music. Some of the early 45 RPM single releases featured New Orleans rhythm and blues artists such as Professor Longhair, Dr. John, and Johnny Adams, but after the label began producing LPs and CDs, the artist roster was comprised almost exclusively of zydeco musicians.

As a small, independent record label, Maison de Soul shares some of the same problems as other similar labels: getting the product to distributors and on the shelves of record stores, as well as getting their acts known. As a form of ethnic music, many potential buyers of zydeco aren't always familiar with the artists or their musical styles, so Maison de Soul has had success with issuing compilation albums by various artists, the best-selling one titled Zydeco Festival (1988). Some of these compilation albums have included a few Cajun musicians, although they are primarily focused on zydeco.

Soileau said that zydeco music sales in general and for Maison de Soul in particular were enhanced by the popularity of the 1987 film The Big Easy, which was set in and shot on location in New Orleans. The film's soundtrack was released on Island Records and featured several zydeco and Cajun music artists, as well as New Orleans R&B and gospel groups.

In addition to the market in Louisiana, Maison de Soul has exported its zydeco sound to the US East Coast and California, as well as Australia, Canada, and Europe. Soileau says sales are enhanced in areas where alternative radio stations have Louisiana "gumbo" type of programming.

Some of the top names in the Maison de Soul catalog are Clifton Chenier, Rockin' Dopsie, Boozoo Chavis, John Delafose, the band Zydeco Force, Willis Prudhomme, Lynn August, and Rockin' Sidney.

== "My Toot Toot" ==
Maison de Soul had its biggest hit with the Rockin' Sidney song "My Toot Toot", released on Sidney's 1984 album My Zydeco Shoes Got the Zydeco Blues. The song was subsequently released as a single in January 1985 in Louisiana and Texas, and became a regional hit. The original recording was later leased to Epic Records, who released it nationally, and made it to the Country Top 40 charts, where it remained for 18 weeks. It was the first zydeco song to receive major airplay on pop, rock and country radio stations. Later in 1985, "My Toot Toot" was certified platinum and won the 1986 Grammy Award for Best Ethnic or Traditional Folk Recording. The song has been covered by artists as varied as Fats Domino, Rosie Ledet, Jean Knight, Terrance Simien, Doug Kershaw, Denise LaSalle, Jimmy C. Newman and John Fogerty. A Spanish version titled "Mi Cu-Cu" by La Sonora Dinamita sold over a million copies in Mexico, Central America, and South America and was a top-played song in the Latino radio market as late as 2011. A German beer company licensed it to use in their radio and television commercials. Decades after "My Toot Toot" debuted, it continued to draw royalties from commercial use in Europe, as well as earnings from cover versions in several languages by dozens of musicians.

== Roster ==
The list below includes singles, studio or live albums, or appearances on Maison de Soul various-artist compilation albums.

- Johnny Adams
- Donna Angelle
- Corey Arceneaux
- Chris Ardoin
- Lawrence Ardoin
- Morris Ardoin
- Lynn August
- Bad Weather
- Dewey Balfa & The Balfa Brothers
- Beau Jocque & Zydeco High Rollers
- Beau Michael
- BeauSoleil
- Big Red
- Eddie Bo
- Jeffery Broussard
- Angie Brown
- J. J. Caillier
- Roy Carrier
- The Carriére Brothers
- Gregg Chambers
- Boozoo Chavis
- Clifton Chenier
- Wilfred Chevis
- Creole Junction
- The Creole Zydeco Farmers
- John Delafose
- L.C. Donatto & the Drifters
- Michael Doucet
- Dr. John
- Thomas "Big Hat" Fields
- Morris Francis
- Keith Frank
- Preston Frank & His Zydeco Family Band
- Ann Goodly
- Gumbo Cajun Band
- Peppermint Harris
- Clarence "Frogman" Henry
- Jabo
- Donnie Jacobs
- Jambalaya Cajun Band
- Jean Pierre and the Zydeco Angels
- Jeremy & the Zydeco Hot Boyz
- Al "Carnival Time" Johnson
- Earl King
- Kuumba
- Wilfred Latour
- The Lawtell Playboys
- Morris Ledet
- Rosie Ledet
- Lil' Bob and the Lollipops
- Lil' Malcolm & the House Rockers
- Lil' Pookie
- Major Handy
- Chuck Martin
- Nathan & the Zydeco Cha Chas
- Olympia Brass Band
- J. Paul, Jr.
- Al Prince
- Professor Longhair
- Willis Prudhomme
- Rebirth Brass Band
- Jo Jo Reed
- Zachary Richard
- Tommy Ridgley
- Rockin' Dopsie
- Rockin' Sidney
- Roddie Romero
- Sam Brothers Five
- Terrance Simien
- Warren Storm
- T-Lou & His Los Angeles Zydeco Band
- Irma Thomas
- Leo Thomas
- Leroy Thomas
- Tabby Thomas
- Horace Trahan
- Frank Turner
- Walter "Wolfman" Washington
- Buckwheat Zydeco
- Zydeco Brothers
- Zydeco Force
- Zydeco Joe
- Zydeco Warriors
- Marc Zydiac

== Awards ==
Maison de Soul recordings that have been nominated for awards include:

Artist	Recording title	Release year	Catalog number	Award	Result	Ref.
Rockin' Sidney	"My Toot Toot" (single)	1985	MdS-1009-2	28th Annual Grammy Awards for Best Ethnic or Traditional Folk Recording	Won	
Rockin' Sidney	"My Toot Toot" (single)	1985	MdS-1009-2	Handy Blues Foundation Song of the Year	Won	
Rockin' Sidney	"My Toot Toot" (single)	1985	MdS-1009-2	BMI Awards	Won	
Tabby Thomas	"Bad Luck and Trouble"/"I Can't Hold Out" (single)	1986	45-1029	W.C. Handy Award for Blues Single of the Year	Nominated	
Rockin' Dopsie	Saturday Night Zydeco (album)	1988	LP-1025; MdS-CD-104 (CD re-release in 1989)	31st Annual Grammy Awards Best Traditional Blues Album	Nominated	

== See also ==
- List of record labels
