= Zydeco Force =

American zydeco band

Zydeco Force was an American Creole zydeco band from Opelousas, Louisiana, United States. Zydeco Force is best known for its tracks "Hey Madeline" and "B-Flat".

== History ==
The band consisted of Robby Robinson, Raymond Thomas, and the two sons of Lawtell Playboys frontman Delton Broussard: Shelton and Jeffery Broussard, and Delton's nephew Herbert Broussard. They formed in 1989 and became a regional hit across Louisiana and East Texas. The band was featured in the award-winning German film, Schultze Gets the Blues, filmed in the former East Germany and in Texas and Louisiana.

Jeffery Broussard has his own band, Jeffery Broussard & The Creole Cowboys. They have performed worldwide, and appeared at the Augusta Heritage Festival, in Elkins, West Virginia, during Augusta's Cajun/Zydeco week in various years, as well as New Orleans Jazz & Heritage Festival. They continue to perform for many other festivals and live venues from coast to coast.

Zydeco Force guitarist Shelton Broussard died on November 6, 2012, during a fire at his home, aged 49.

== Albums ==
- Shaggy Dog Two-Step (Maison de Soul, 1992)
- Zydeco Push (Maison de Soul, 1994)
- It's La La Time (Maison de Soul, 1995)
- You Mean The World To Me (Maison de Soul, 2001)
- Rock A-While Z-Force Style (Maison de Soul, 2003)
- Louisiana Chicken Shack (Shrimp, 2005)
- We're Back! (J and S Records, 2007)
