= Geno Delafose =

American zydeco accordionist and singer

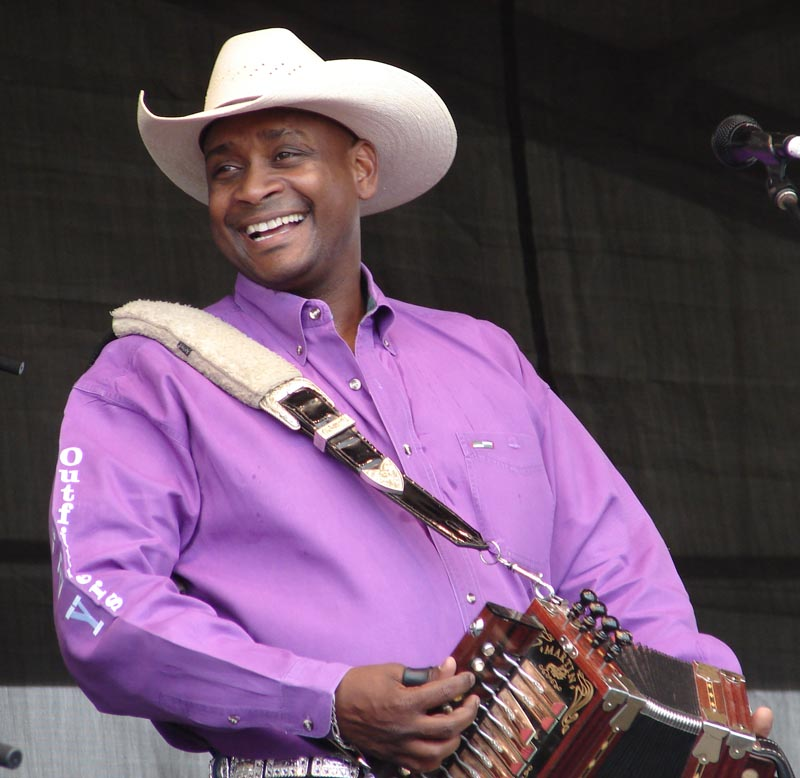
- Delafose at the New Orleans Jazz & Heritage Festival, 2006

Background information
- Born: February 6, 1971 (age 55); Eunice, Louisiana, U.S.
- Genres: Zydeco
- Occupations: Musician, singer
- Instrument: Accordion
- Years active: 1994 - present
- Labels: Rounder Records; Times Square Records
- Website: www.genodelafosemusic.com

Geno Delafose (born February 6, 1971) is an American zydeco accordionist and singer. He is one of the younger generations of the genre who has created the sound known as the nouveau zydeco. His sound is deeply rooted in traditional Creole music with strong influences from Cajun music and also country and western. His father was the fellow zydeco accordion player, John Delafose.

== History ==
Delafose was born and raised in Eunice, Louisiana. At the age of eight, he joined his father's band, the Eunice Playboys as a rubboard player and continued to play with the band until his father's death in 1994. He also appeared on several of the band's recordings. He switched to the accordion in the early 1990s and started to play as an opening act for his father.

In 1994, he debuted with album French Rockin' Boogie on Rounder Records. The name of this album also became the name of his band with whom he still plays. He released two more albums on the label, before signing with Times Square Records to release Everybody's Dancin' in 2003.

He has also appeared on the compilation album Creole Bred: A Tribute to Creole & Zydeco released in 2004 by Vanguard Records.

He was nominated for a Grammy Award in the Best Zydeco or Cajun Music Album category for his 2007 album Le Cowboy Creole.

Delafose lives in Duralde, near Eunice, Louisiana, where he operates his Double D Ranch raising cattle and horses. He also holds fan appreciation parties annually at the ranch.

== Awards and honors ==
=== Grammy Awards ===
Year	Category	Work nominated	Result	Ref.
2008	Best Zydeco or Cajun Music Album	Le Cowboy Creole	Nominated	

=== Gambit's Big Easy Music Awards ===
Year	Category	Result	Ref.
2008	Best Zydeco	Nominated	

=== OffBeat's Best of The Beat Awards ===
Year	Category	Work nominated	Result	Ref.
2003	Best Zydeco Album	Everybody's Dancing	Won	
2011	Best Zydeco Band or Performer		Won	

== Discography ==
- 1994 - French Rockin' Boogie (Rounder)
- 1996 - That's What I'm Talkin' About! (Rounder)
- 1998 - La Chanson Perdue (Rounder)
- 2003 - Everybody's Dancin' (Times Square)
- 2007 - Le Cowboy Creole (Times Square)
