= John Delafose =

American zydeco musician (1939–1994)

- Delafose playing the accordion, circa the 1980s

Background information
- Born: John Irvin Delafose; April 16, 1939; Duralde, Evangeline Parish, Louisiana, U.S.
- Died: September 18, 1994 (aged 55) Opelousas, Louisiana, U.S.
- Genres: Zydeco
- Occupations: Musician, songwriter
- Instruments: Accordion, vocals
- Years active: 1970s–1994
- Labels: Arhoolie, Rounder, Maison de Soul

John Irvin Delafose (April 16, 1939 – September 18, 1994) was an American French-speaking Creole Zydeco accordionist from Louisiana.

== Early life ==
Delafose was born in the unincorporated village of Duralde, Evangeline Parish, Louisiana, near Mamou. His parents were sharecroppers. As a child, Delafose fashioned fiddles and guitars out of old boards and cigar boxes fitted with window-screen wire. The fiddle was his first instrument. He eventually took up the harmonica, and at the age of 18 learned the button accordion. However, he turned to farming and did not pursue music as a career until the early 1970s.

== Career ==
He began as an accordionist and harmonicist with a variety of local Zydeco bands. In the mid-1970s, he formed the band The Eunice Playboys, with which he played until his death. Over its history, band members included three of his sons, as well as nephews and grandsons. The band continued under the direction of his son Geno Delafose.

A breakout hit for Delafose was "Joe Pitre a Deux Femmes" ("Joe Pitre has two women") on the Maison de Soul label in 1980, commercially reviving an older sound reminiscent of Amédé Ardoin. Buckwheat Zydeco followed up with his own "Madame Pitre a Deux Hommes" (Mrs. Pitre has two men) on his 1983 album Turning Point. Delafose gained wider public recognition with albums such as Joe Pete Got Two Women (Arhoolie, 1990) and Blues Stay Away from Me (Rounder, 1993).

He was seen in performance footage and his music was featured on the soundtrack of the 1992 John Sayles film Passion Fish. He was also a featured artist in the 1989 documentary film J'ai été au bal (I Went to the Dance).

== Style ==
Delafose had a dynamic style and strong rural roots, with a strong staccato rhythm on the accordion, which has influenced almost all current Zydeco musicians. Unlike some of the younger performers at the time, Delafose sang in both English and French, and his repertoire featured two-steps and waltzes in addition to the highly percussive Afro-Caribbean rhythms of Zydeco. He occasionally played fiddle with the band, which was rare in Zydeco music. He and his band packed audiences into dance halls in southwest Louisiana, east Texas and New Orleans for more than 20 years.

Delafose's hit version of the Canray Fontenot song "Joe Pitre a Deux Femmes" brought the single-row accordion back into favor among Zydeco musicians.

== Death ==
Delafose had a heart attack in 1993, while on the road headed toward a festival in Rhode Island. He later recovered, but experienced bouts of fatigue afterwards.

Delafose died after a short illness in the early morning hours of September 18, 1994 at the Opelousas General Hospital. He was buried in the cemetery of St. Mathilda Catholic Church in Eunice, Louisiana.

== Discography ==
=== Studio and live albums ===
Album title	Record label	Stock number	Release year
Zydeco Man	Arhoolie	1083	1981
Uncle Bud Zydeco	Arhoolie	1088	1983
Zydeco Excitement	Maison de Soul	MDS-1015	1985
Zydeco Live!: Direct from Richard's Club, Lawtell, Louisiana	Rounder	CD 2070	1989
Heartaches and Hot Steps	Maison de Soul	MDS-LP-1035	1990
Joe Pete Got Two Women	Arhoolie	CD-335	1990
Père et Garçon Zydeco	Rounder	CD 2116	1992
Blues Stay Away From Me	Rounder	CD 2121	1993

=== Singles ===
Song title(s)	Album title	Record label	Stock number	Release year	Note(s)
"Co-Fe? (Why?)" / "Joe Pitre A Deux Femmes"	Zydeco Man	Arhoolie	45-541	1980	7", 45 RPM
"Blues At Midnight" / "Baby, Scratch My Back"	<unknown>	Bad Weather Records	BW 113	1981	7", 45 RPM
"Joe Pete Lost His Two Women" / "Mother's Day Blues"	Uncle Bud Zydeco	Arhoolie	45-547	1983?	7", 45 RPM
"Blues At Midnight" / "Do The Mill"	Zydeco Excitement / <unknown>	Maison de Soul	45-1019	1985?	7", 45 RPM
"Loan Me Your Handkerchief" / "Broken Hearted"	Zydeco Excitement	Maison de Soul	45-1034	1986	7", 45 RPM

=== Various artist compilation albums ===
Album title	Record label	Stock number	Release year	Song title(s)
Festival de Musique Acadienne '81 Live	Swallow Records	LP-6046	1982	"Nairobi Special"
Zydeco Festival	Maison de Soul	MDS LP-1024	1988	"Broken Hearted"
Kings of Zydeco: Black Creole Music from the Deep South	Trikont (Germany)	CD-0158-2	1989	"Broken Hearted"
Kings of Zydeco: Black Creole Music from the Deep South	Trikont (Germany)	CD-0158-2	1989	"Joe Pete Is Broke"
Kings of Zydeco: Black Creole Music from the Deep South	Trikont (Germany)	CD-0158-2	1989	"Chokin Kind"
101 Proof Zydeco	Maison de Soul	MDS 1030-2	1990	"Broken Hearted"
J'ai Eté au Bal = I Went to the Dance: the Cajun and Zydeco Music of Louisiana	Arhoolie	CD-331	1990	"Joe Pitre a Deux Femmes"
Alligator Stomp: Cajun & Zydeco Classics, Vol. 2	Rhino	R2 70740	1991	"Ka-wann"
Alligator Stomp: Cajun & Zydeco Classics, Vol. 3	Rhino	R2 70312	1992	"Co-Fé? (Why?)"
Cajun Music and Zydeco	Rounder	CD 11572	1992	"La misère m'a fait brailler"
Stomp Down Zydeco	Rounder	11566	1992	"Hold That Tiger"
Stomp Down Zydeco	Rounder	11566	1992	"Cajun Two-Step"
Stomp Down Zydeco	Rounder	11566	1992	"I'm Gone and I Won't Be Back"
Stomp Down Zydeco	Rounder	11566	1992	"Broken Hearted"
Stomp Down Zydeco	Rounder	11566	1992	"Onion Town"
Zydeco Champs	Arhoolie	CD 328	1992	"Joe Pete Got Two Women"
Zydeco Champs	Arhoolie	CD 328	1992	"Mardi Gras Song"
Zydeco Party	Ace (UK)	430	1992	"Loan Me Your Handkerchief"
Zydeco Party	K-Tel International	60592	1992	"Mardi Gras Song"
The Best of Louisiana Music	Rounder	CD AN 08	1993	"Watch That Dog"
Passion Fish: Original Soundtrack	Daring Records	CD-3008	1993	"Oh, Negresse"
Passion Fish: Original Soundtrack	Daring Records	CD-3008	1993	"Grand Mamou"
Passion Fish: Original Soundtrack	Daring Records	CD-3008	1993	"Poor Man's Two-Step"
Let's Go Zydeco!	Ace (UK)	CDCHD 543	1994	"Petite Et La Grosse"
Let's Go Zydeco!	Ace (UK)	CDCHD 543	1994	"Crying in The Streets"
Let's Go Zydeco!	Ace (UK)	CDCHD 543	1994	"Lonesome Road"
Let's Go Zydeco!	Ace (UK)	CDCHD 543	1994	"Mardi Gras Song"
Rockin' Zydeco Party!	Maison de Soul	1049	1994	"John's Lonesome Waltz"
Alligator Stomp: Cajun & Zydeco, The Next Generation, Vol. 5	Rhino	R2 71846	1995	"Slow Motion Zydeco"
Legends of Zydeco: The Old School Strikes Back	Trikont (Germany)	US-0203	1995	"Loan Me Your Handkerchief"
Legends of Zydeco: The Old School Strikes Back	Trikont (Germany)	US-0203	1995	"Outside Woman"
Legends of Zydeco: The Old School Strikes Back	Trikont (Germany)	US-0203	1995	"Morning Train"
Legends of Zydeco: The Old School Strikes Back	Trikont (Germany)	US-0203	1995	"Blues at Midnight"
Legends of Zydeco: The Old School Strikes Back	Trikont (Germany)	US-0203	1995	"Mon Coeur Fait Mal"
Legends of Zydeco: The Old School Strikes Back	Trikont (Germany)	US-0203	1995	"Joe Simien Special"
Legends of Zydeco: The Old School Strikes Back	Trikont (Germany)	US-0203	1995	"John's Lonesome Waltz"
Legends of Zydeco: The Old School Strikes Back	Trikont (Germany)	US-0203	1995	"Co-Fé?"
Legends of Zydeco: The Old School Strikes Back	Trikont (Germany)	US-0203	1995	"Ma Femme m'a quitte" (with Geno Delafose)
Louisiana Spice: 25 Years of Louisiana Music on Rounder Records	Rounder	CD AN 25 Part 2	1995	"Père et Garçon Zydeco"
More Cajun Music and Zydeco	Rounder	CD 11573	1995	"Poor Man's Two-Step"
The Real Music Box: 25 Years of Rounder Records	Rounder	CD AN 25	1995	"Père et Garçon Zydeco"
The Royal Family of Zydeco	Rock 'n Bowl	1001	1995	"Watch That Dog"
Bayou Dance Party	Rounder	CD 7014	1996	"My Little Dog"
It's What We Do, Vol. 1, 1995	Daring Records	3020	1996	"Oh, Negresse"
Let's Have a Blues Ball	Arhoolie	590	1996	"Rag Around Your Head"
The Real Louisiana	EasyDisc	ED 9002	1996	"La misère m'a fait brailler"
Zydeco's Greatest Hits	EasyDisc	ED CD 7025	1996	"Broken Hearted"
15 Louisiana Zydeco Classics	Arhoolie	CD 105	1997	"Rag Around Your Head"
15 Louisiana Zydeco Classics	Arhoolie	CD 105	1997	"Oh, Negresse"
Bayou Beat	EasyDisc	EDCD 7053	1997	"Old Time Two Step"
Bayou Hot Sauce	EasyDisc	ED 7044	1997	"Père et Garçon Zydeco"
Zydeco Dance Hall	EasyDisc	ED 7035	1997	"I Don't Want Nobody Here But You"
Zydeco Dance Hall	EasyDisc	ED 7035	1997	"Gotta Find My Woman"
Rough Guide to Cajun and Zydeco	World Music Network (UK)	RGNET 1028 CD	1998	"La misère m'a fait brailler"
Zydeco Barnyard	EasyDisc	12136-7070-2	1998	"Watch That Dog"
Zydeco Party	EasyDisc	ED CD 7045	1998	"Oh 'Tit Fille"
Zydeco Stomp: All Instrumental	Rounder	ED CD 7065	1998	"Two-Step Farouche"
Cajun & Zydeco Jamboree	EasyDisc	ED 12136-7076-2	1999	"Midland Two-Step"
Kings of Cajun: 15 Stomps from the Swamps	Music Collection International (UK)	50105	1999	"Broken Hearted"
Zydeco Essentials	Hip-O Records	767 440161 2	1999	"Joe Pete Got Two Women"
40th Anniversary Collection, 1960–2000: The Journey of Chris Strachwitz	Arhoolie	CD 491	2000	"Co-Fé?"
Music from the Zydeco Kingdom	Rounder Select	11579	2000	"Tu M'As Fait Brailler: You Made Me Cry"
Cajun & Zydeco: Alligator Walk	ARC Music	EUCD 1657	2001	"Old Time Two Step" (with Geno Delafose)
Roots Music: An American Journey	Rounder	11661-0501-2	2001	"Père et Garçon Zydeco" (with Geno Delafose)
Dat's Zydeco: The Best Old-Skool Zydeco	Maison de Soul	MDS 1079	2002	"Richard Two-Step"
Louisiana	World Music Network (UK)	RGNET 1094 CD	2002	"Slow Motion Zydeco"
Southern Style: Zydeco	Southern Style (Netherlands)	641920	2002	"Joe Pete Is Broke"
Southern Style: Zydeco	Southern Style (Netherlands)	641920	2002	"Lake Charles Two-Step"
Zydeco: The Essential Collection	Rounder	1166-11605-2	2002	"Friday Night Waltz"
Rough Guide to Zydeco	World Music Network (UK)	RGNET 1145 CD	2005	"Joe Pete Got Two Women"
Zydeco: The Essential Pulse Series	Mirana	8502	2008	"Loan Me Your Handkerchief"
Good Music, Good Times: Spicy Bon Temps Cajun and Zydeco Music from Opelousas, Louisiana	Swallow	<unknown>	2009	"Broken Hearted"
