= Zydeco =

Music genre developed in Louisiana, U.S.

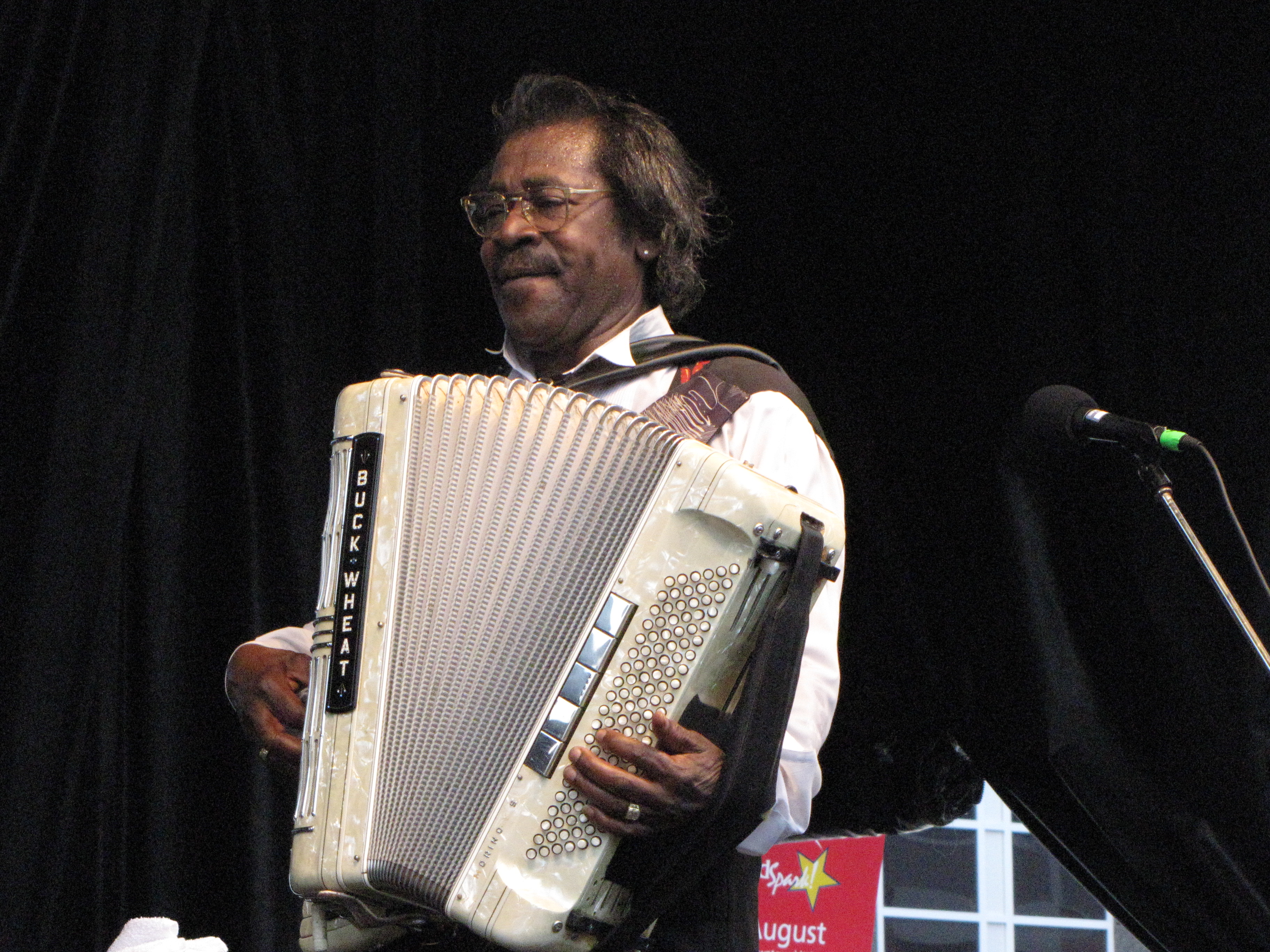
- Buckwheat Zydeco with accordion
- Etymology: From French les haricots ("the beans"), from a phrase used idiomatically to express hardship
- Other names: Zarico, zodigo, le musique Creole
- Stylistic origins: Blues; Cajun music; country; Creole music; Native American music; rhythm and blues
- Cultural origins: Early 20th century, Louisiana, U.S.
- Typical instruments: Piano accordion; Cajun accordion; washboard; electric bass; electric guitar; drum set

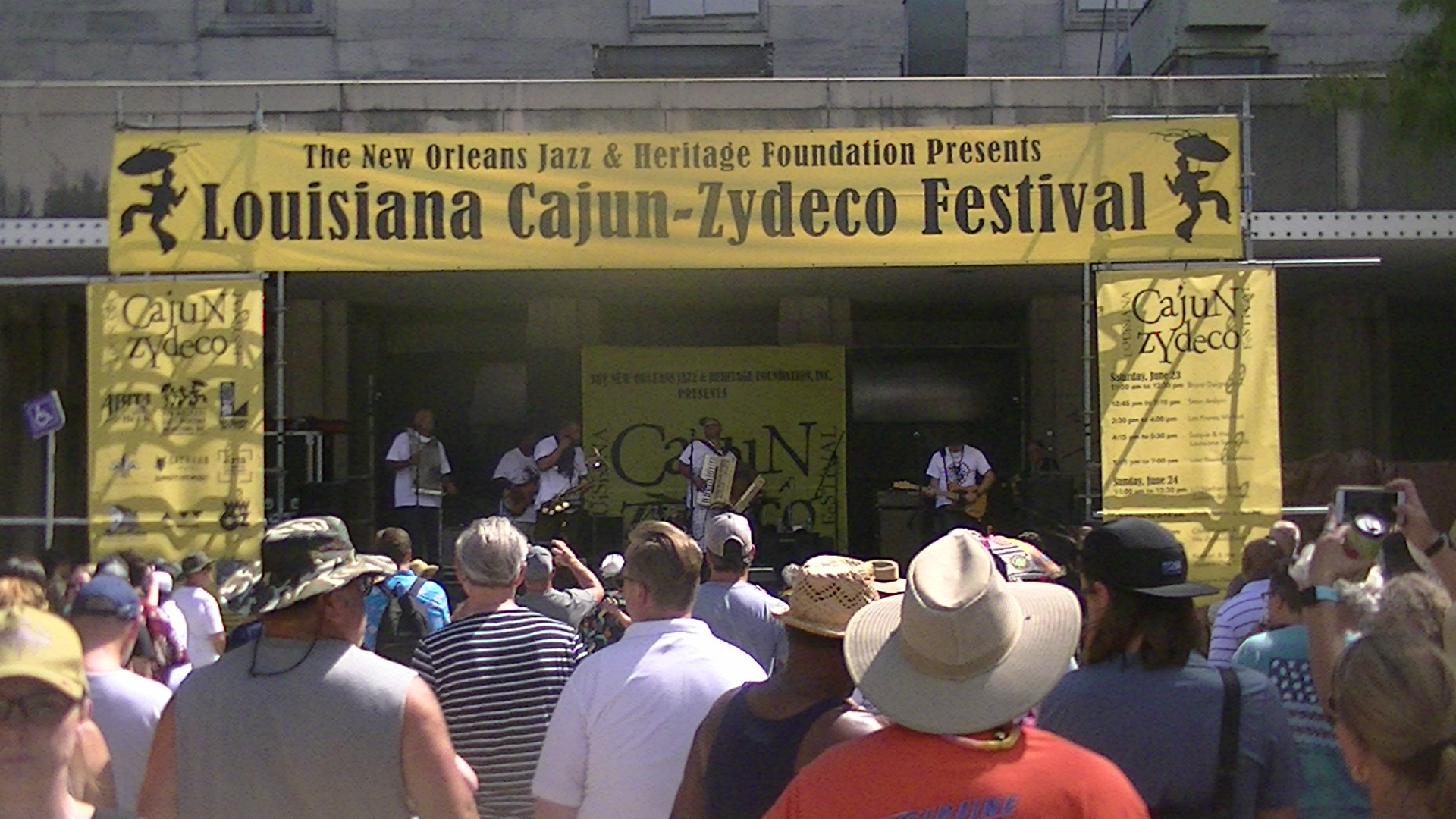
New Orleans Cajun-Zydeco Fest, 2019

Zydeco (/ˈzaɪdɪˌkoʊ, -diː-/ ZY-dih-koh, -dee-; French: zarico) is a music genre that was created in rural Southwest Louisiana by French-speaking African Americans of Creole heritage. It incorporates blues and rhythm and blues with music indigenous to the Louisiana Creoles, such as la la and juré. The main instruments are accordion and rubboard (washboard) or vest frottoir.

== Characteristics ==
Zydeco music is typically played in an uptempo, syncopated manner with a strong rhythmic core, and often incorporates elements of blues, rock and roll, soul music, R&B, and early Creole music. Zydeco music is centered on the accordion, which leads the rest of the band, and a specialized washboard, called a vest frottoir, as a prominent percussive instrument. Other common instruments in zydeco are the electric guitar, bass, keyboard, and drum set. If there are accompanying lyrics, they are typically sung in English or French. Many zydeco performers create original zydeco compositions, though it is also common for musicians to adapt blues standards, R&B hits, and traditional Cajun tunes into the zydeco style.

== Origin of term ==
The origin of the term "zydeco" is uncertain. One theory is that it derives from the French phrase Les haricots [ne] sont pas salés, which, when spoken in Louisiana French, is pronounced [lez‿a.ɾi.ko sɔ̃ pa saˈle]. This literally translates as "the green beans aren't salted" and is used idiomatically to express hardship.

Initially, several different spellings of the word existed, including "zarico" and "zodico" (in some dialects of French, r has the same pronunciation used by certain dialects of American English for specific instances of d — a voiced alveolar tap [ɾ]).

In 1960, musicologist Mack McCormick used the spelling "zydeco" in the liner notes for a compilation album: A Treasury of Field Recordings. The word was used in reviews, and McCormick began publicizing it around Houston as a standard spelling. Its use was also accepted by musician Clifton Chenier (who had earlier recorded "Zodico Stomp" in 1955) in his recording "Zydeco Sont Pas Salés". Chenier later claimed credit for having coined this spelling.

Another possible root word for zydeco is a West African term for "musicking". Recent studies based on early Louisiana recordings made by Alan and John Lomax suggest that the term, as well as the tradition, may have African origins. The West African languages of tribes affected by the slave trade provide some clues as to the origins of zydeco. In at least a dozen languages from this cultural area of Africa, the syllables "za", "re", and "go" are frequently associated with dancing and/or playing music. It is also possible that "za re go" evolved into les haricots by French-Creole speaking generations unfamiliar with the original language, turning what would have been unfamiliar words into a phonetically similar phrase in the regional language.

The word "zydeco" can refer to the musical genre, the dance style, or a social gathering at which the music is played.

== Early history ==
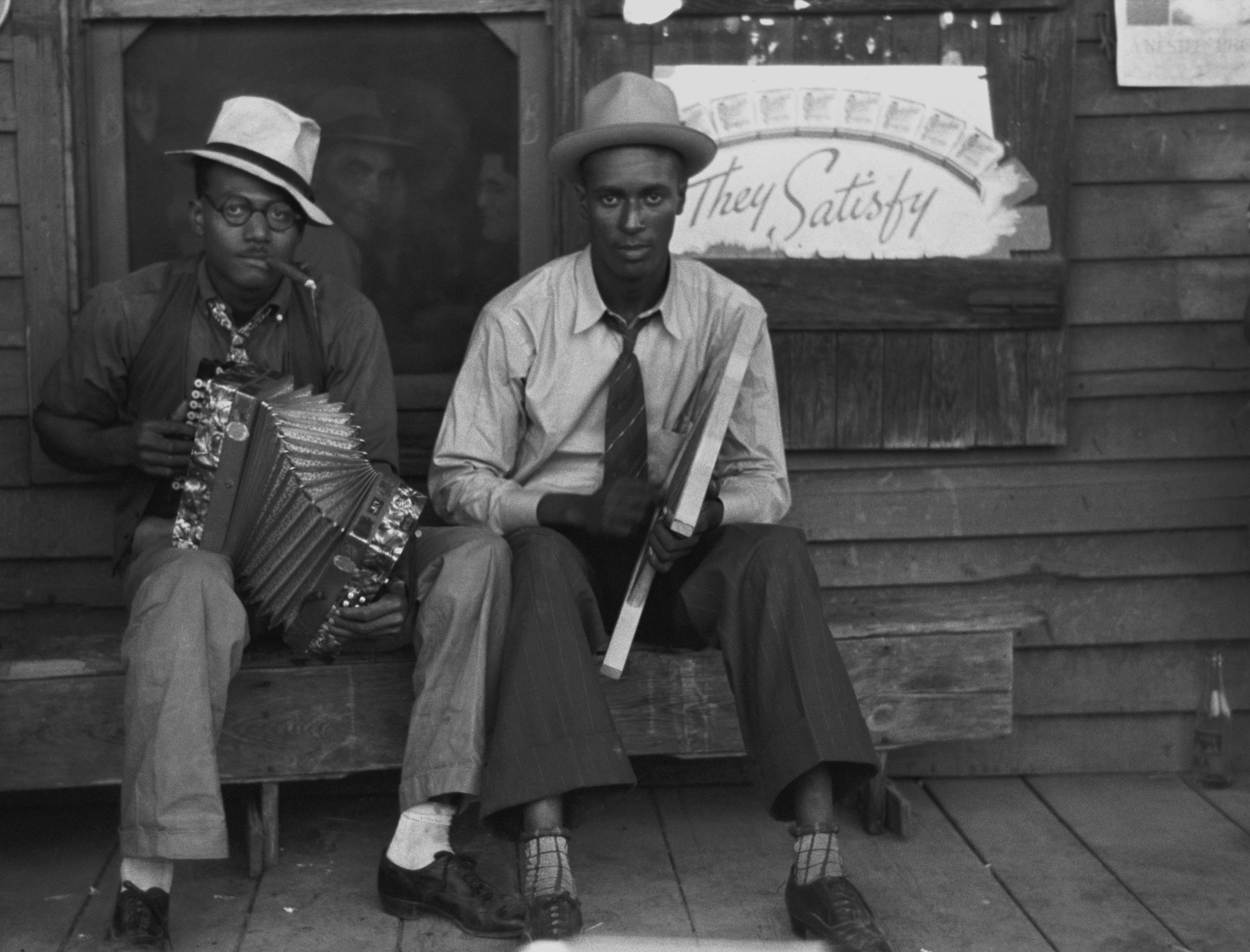
Early Creole musicians playing an accordion and a washboard in front of a store, near Opelousas, Louisiana (1938).

The original French settlers came to Louisiana in the late 1600s, sent by the Regent of France, Philippe d'Orléans, Duke of Orléans, to help settle La Louisiane (the Louisiana Territory) they claimed as a colony. Arriving in New Orleans on seven ships, the settlers quickly moved into the bayous and swamps. There, the French culture permeated those of the Spanish and Native American Indians, who had long populated the area.

In 1720, German Catholics founded the third permanent European settlement in the territory in St. John the Baptist Parish, part of what became known as the German Coast. Later in the 18th century, more German and Irish immigrants also settled in this area. Europeans imported or acquired African slaves as workers, and they soon outnumbered the whites on major sugar cane and other plantations. Through the decades, all of these peoples gradually mixed.

For 150 years, Louisiana Creoles enjoyed an insular lifestyle, prospering, educating themselves without the government, and building their invisible communities under the Code Noir created by the French in 1724 to establish rules for the treatment of enslaved Africans. It also established restrictions and rights for gens de couleur libres, free people of color who were a growing class, often descended from French white men and Black African or mixed-race women. They had the right to own land, something which few blacks or people of color in the American South had at that time.

The disruption of the Louisiana Creole community began when the United States made the Louisiana Purchase and Americans started settling in the state, particularly migrating from the Southeast. The new settlers typically recognized only the binary system of race that prevailed in the slave societies common where they had come from. The American states had made laws based on the assumption of second-class status for most people of visible African descent, because of its strong association with the caste of slavery.

When the Civil War ended, and the black slaves were freed across the South, Louisiana Creoles who had been free before the war often assumed positions of leadership during Reconstruction. However, segregationist Democrats in Louisiana classified Creoles as Black, or as having the same status as freed slaves. Despite the Fifteenth Amendment to the United States Constitution ratified in 1870, the end of the 19th century, Louisiana, Mississippi, and other former Confederate states were passing new constitutions and laws to disenfranchise most blacks and many poor whites under rules designed to suppress black voting. Creoles continued to press for education and advancement while negotiating the new society.

Zydeco's rural beginnings and the prevailing economic conditions at its inception are reflected in the song titles, lyrics, and bluesy vocals. The music arose as a synthesis of traditional Creole music and African-American traditions, including R&B, blues, jazz, and gospel. It was also often just called French music or la musique Creole known as "la-la."

Amédé Ardoin, the second and most influential musician of the region to record the Creole music of southwest Louisiana, made his first recordings in 1929. This Creole music served as a foundation for what later became known as zydeco. Originally performed at house dances in the community, the music eventually was also performed in Catholic Church community centers, as Creoles were mostly Catholic, as well as in rural dance halls and nightclubs.

During World War II and the Second Great Migration of the mid-20th century, many French-speaking and Louisiana Creole-speaking Créoles from the area around Marksville and Opelousas, Louisiana left a poor and prejudiced state for better economic opportunities in Texas. Their numbers were surpassed by the many Southern Blacks who migrated to the states of California, Oregon, and Washington, where the buildup of defense industries provided more access to good jobs. They still had to deal with some discrimination but found more opportunities than in the legally segregated South. In California, black people from Louisiana and other Southern states could vote and thus began to participate in political life.

In the 21st-century, zydeco artists and groups perform at blues, folk, and American roots music festivals nationally and internationally.

== Post-war history ==
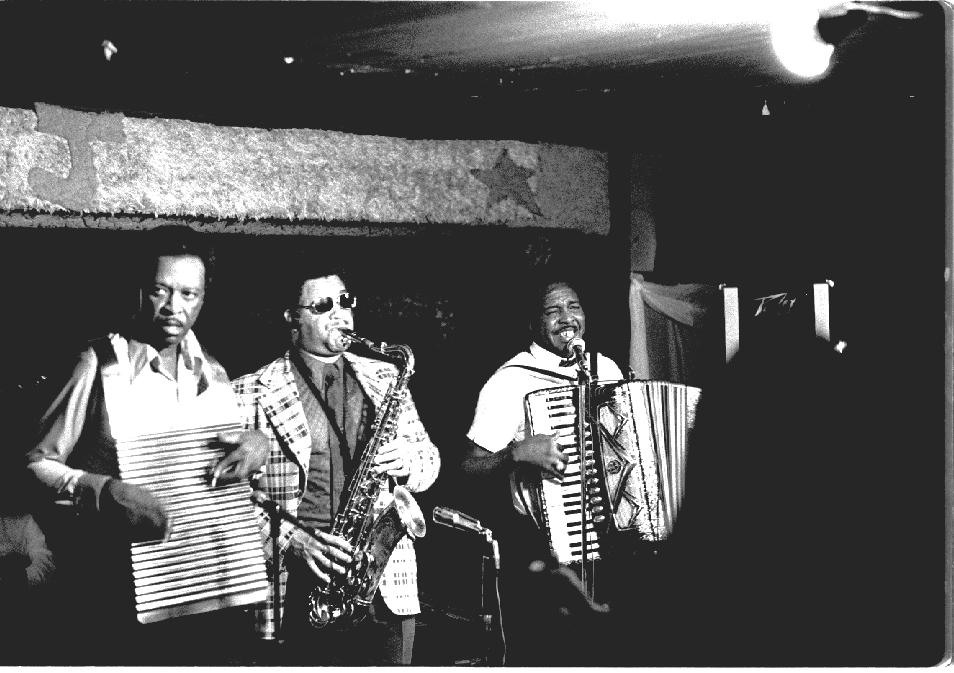
Chenier Brothers performing at Jay's Lounge and Cockpit, Cankton, Louisiana, Mardi Gras, 1975

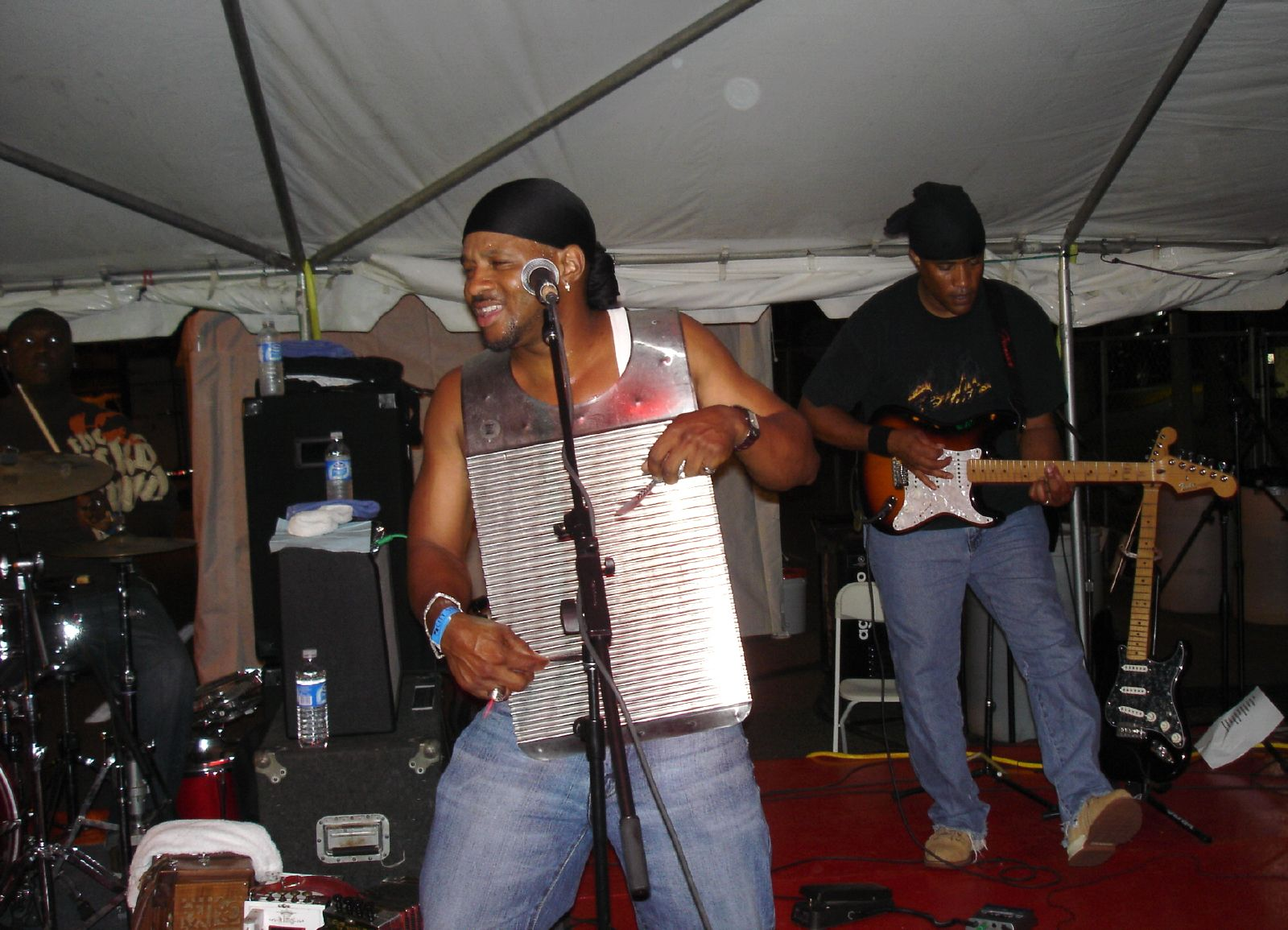
A zydeco musician playing a vest frottoir

Zydeco music pioneer Clifton Chenier, "The King of Zydeco", made zydeco popular on regional radio stations with his bluesy style and keyboard accordion. In the mid-1950s, Chenier's popularity brought zydeco to the fringes of the American mainstream. He signed with Specialty Records, the same label that first recorded Little Richard and Sam Cooke for wide audiences. Chenier, considered the standard-bearer of contemporary zydeco, became the first major zydeco artist. His early hits included "Les Haricots Sont Pas Salés" ("The Snap Beans Ain't Salty" — a reference to the singer being too poor to afford salt pork to season the beans).

The first zydeco vest frottoir was designed by Clifton Chenier in 1946 while he and his brother Cleveland were working at an oil refinery in Port Arthur, Texas. Chenier commissioned the instrument from Willie Landry, a welder-fabricator who worked at the same refinery. Landry's original frottoir is held in the permanent collection of the Smithsonian Institution. There was also a zydeco rubboard on display at the Grammy Museum in Los Angeles, donated by Terrance Simien, and later at the National Museum of African American Music in Nashville, made possible by his wife Cynthia Simien, who lobbied for two years to get the museum's attention. She and Terrance helped curate the zydeco music exhibit placed in the lobby of the museum for its grand opening on January 18, 2021. The rubboard for the display was donated by Reginald Dural, also known as "Buckwheat Zydeco, Jr.", the son of the late zydeco legend Buckwheat Zydeco.

In 1978, Clifton Chenier saw how popular Zydeco was becoming on the road and overseas. He persuaded a young creole/la-la accordionist named Fernest Arceneaux to pick up the accordion again. Arceneaux had given up the accordion in the 1960s to play the guitar. Shortly after, he began to tour internationally as Fernest and the Thunders.

In the mid-1980s, Rockin' Sidney Simien, brought international attention to zydeco music with his hit tune "My Toot Toot". Clifton Chenier, Rockin' Sidney, and Queen Ida all garnered Grammy awards during this pivotal period, opening the door to emerging artists who would continue the traditions. Rockin' Dopsie recorded with Paul Simon on his album Graceland and also signed a major label deal during this time. In 1987, Terrance Simien was also signed to a major label, Restless Records, a punk and metal label by the A&R rep, Ron Goudie, who signed Poison to Enigma Records, which later became Restless/Enigma.

John Delafose was extremely popular regionally. The music made major advances when emerging bands burst exuberantly onto the national scene, fusing new sounds and styles with the music. Boozoo Chavis, Roy Carrier, Zydeco Force, Nathan and the Zydeco Cha Chas, the Sam Brothers, Terrance Simien, Chubby Carrier, and many others were breathing new life into the music. Zydeco superstar Buckwheat Zydeco, already well into his career, signed his deal with Island Records in the mid-1980s. Combined with the national popularity of Creole food and the popular feature film The Big Easy, set in New Orleans, a zydeco band was featured on screen for the first time in a major theatrically released film: Terrance Simien and the Mallet Playboys exposed the world to zydeco in a film. The soundtrack that was a "who's who" of Louisiana and New Orleans music likely went gold. Zydeco legend Simien also co-wrote with actor Dennis Quaid the song "Closer to You", which played in the love scene between Quaid and Ellen Barkin. The music experienced a renaissance during that time period. New artists were cultivated, the music took a more innovative direction, and zydeco increased in mainstream popularity.

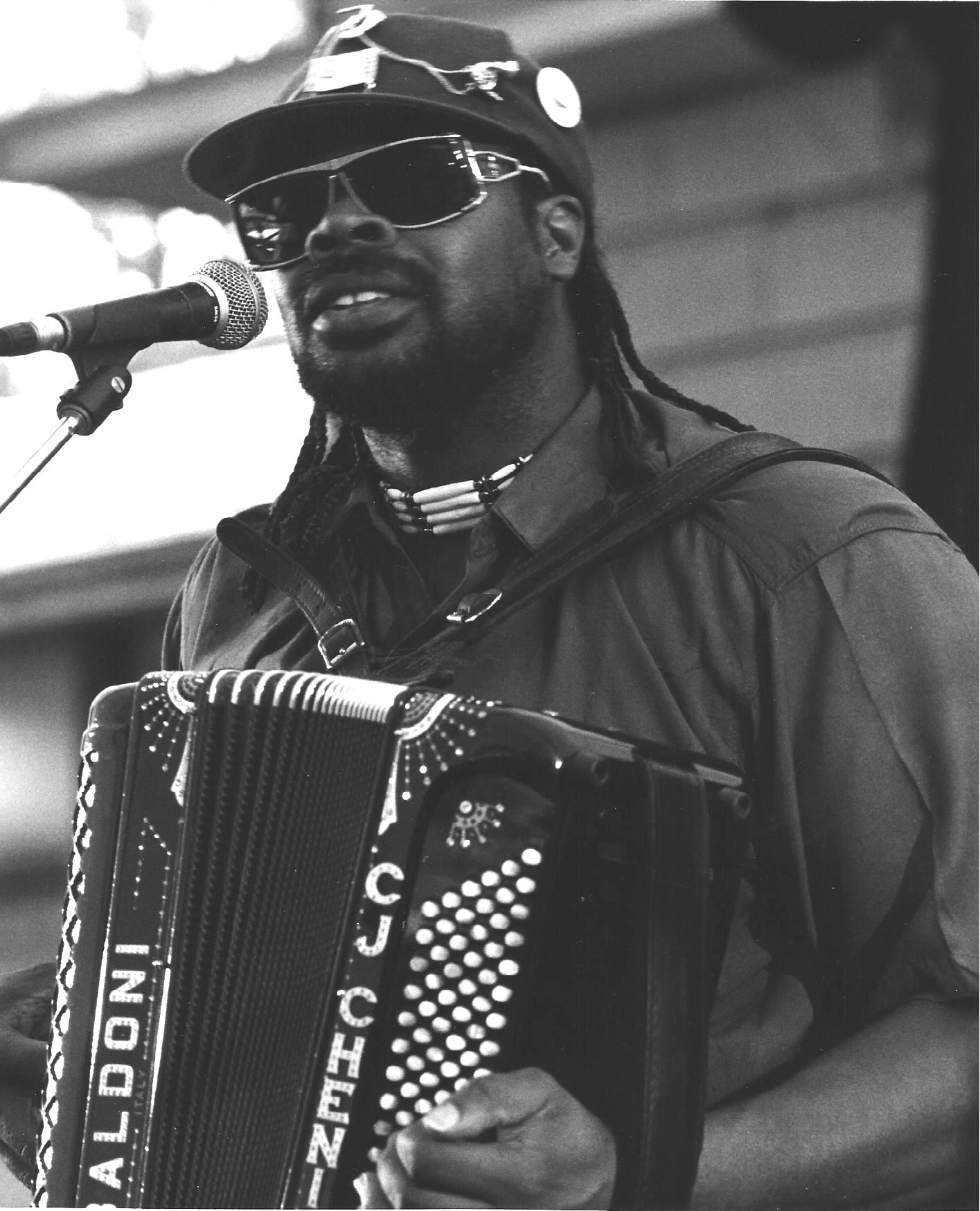
C. J. Chenier performing in the Ross Bandstand

Active zydeco musicians such as C.J. Chenier (son of Clifton Chenier), Chubby Carrier (son of Roy Carrier), Geno Delafose (son of John Delafose), Terrance Simien, and Nathan Williams, among others, began touring internationally during the 1980s. Beau Jocque was a monumental songwriter and innovator who infused zydeco with powerful beats and bass lines in the 1990s, adding striking production and elements of funk, hip-hop, and rap. Young performers such as Chris Ardoin, Keith Frank, Corey Arceneaux (great nephew of Fernest Arceneaux), and Zydeco Force tied the sound to the bass drum rhythm to accentuate or syncopate the backbeat even more. This style is sometimes called "double clutching".

Hundreds of zydeco bands continue the music traditions in Louisiana, with fewer in Texas and even fewer in California. However, with the Great Migration of Black Americans from the South to other cities and states with better opportunities, there was a large Creole population in Texas and to a lesser extent in California. There are also a handful of bands in Europe, Japan, the UK and Australia who play music that has been inspired by this traditional genre. A precocious 7-year-old zydeco accordionist, Guyland Leday, was discovered by HBO after contacting Cynthia and Terrance Simien through their website and educational program "Creole for Kidz and the History of Zydeco." The producers, director and film crew came to Louisiana to film Guyland to be featured in a 2006 HBO documentary film, "The Music in Me: Children's Recitals from Classical to Latin, Jazz to Zydeco ", about music and young people.

In 2007, after a seven-year effort led by Cynthia and Terrance Simien, zydeco was recognized with a separate category in the Grammy awards, the Grammy Award for Best Zydeco or Cajun Music Album. In 2011, the Grammy awards had a major category restructure, eliminating approximately 40 categories and creating new rules for maintaining a category. They eliminated the Best Zydeco or Cajun Music Album category and folded the genres separately into its new "Grammy Award for Best Regional Roots Music Album" category with Native American, Hawaiian, New Orleans Brass band and Mardi Gras Indian, Polka, Gullah, Go-Go and Tejano. However, zydeco artists in this new category continue to receive nominations and Grammy awards. Since the Simiens changed the vocabulary and the way the Recording Academy recognize this genre, there have been hundreds of Louisiana zydeco artists nominated and several dozen honored with a Grammy award. It cannot be underestimated how critical this has been in helping to perpetuate and sustain this traditional American roots music genre.

Another pivotal moment in zydeco music history came in 2009 with the Disney animated film The Princess and the Frog, set in New Orleans. Randy Newman produced the soundtrack and requested Terrance Simien to collaborate with him on the zydeco song. In 2024, Disney introduced a new ride based on the film at both US theme parks, "Tiana's Bayou Adventure," which includes Terrance Simien and the Zydeco Experience including Marcella Simien. Terence Blanchard and PJ Morton produced the music for the new ride.

Twenty-first century zydeco artists of note include Lil' Nate (son of Nathan Williams), Leon Chavis, and Rusty Metoyer. Andre Thierry has kept the tradition alive on the West Coast, while Corey Arceneaux, among other artists, performs on the East Coast. Dwayne Dopsie (son of Rockin' Dopsie) and his band, the Zydeco Hellraisers, were nominated for best Regional Roots Album in the 2017 Grammy Awards. In 2024, at the 66th Annual Grammy Awards, Buckwheat Zydeco Jr. (son of the late Buckwheat Zydeco) and the Legendary Ils Sont Partis Band took home the Grammy award for Best Regional Roots Music Album.

Zydeco has become synonymous with the cultural and musical identity of Louisiana, the American South, and the United States. Along with all the other popular and culturally important music genres of Louisiana, zydeco has helped put the state on the music map of the world.

== Additional academic literature ==
- Burt Feintuch, Jeannie Banks Thomas, editor, Gary Samson, photographs. Creole Soul: Zydeco Lives. Jackson: University Press of Mississippi, 2022. 280 pages. ISBN 1496842464.
