= Chubby Carrier =

American zydeco musician

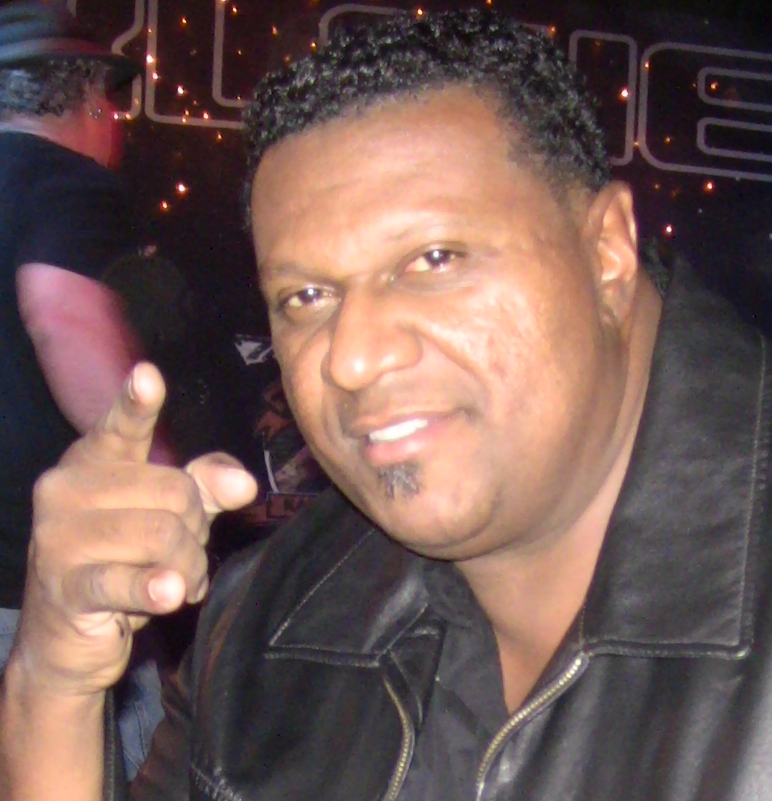
- Chubby Carrier at Knuckleheads Saloon in Kansas City, Missouri

Background information
- Born: Joseph Roy "Chubby" Carrier Jr. July 1, 1967 (age 59); Lafayette, Louisiana, United States
- Genres: Zydeco
- Occupations: Musician singer songwriter
- Instrument: Accordion
- Years active: 1979–present
- Label: Swampadellic
- Member of: Chubby Carrier and the Bayou Swamp Band
- Website: chubbycarrier.com

Roy "Chubby" Carrier is an American zydeco musician. He is the leader of Chubby Carrier and the Bayou Swamp Band.

== Biography ==
Carrier's father and grandfather both played zydeco music, and his cousins recorded under the name The Carrier Brothers. He was taught to play accordion by his father, Roy Carrier Sr., and played with his father's band at age 12, first on accordion and then on drums. By age 17, he played drums with Terrance Simien from 1986 until 1989, then formed a group of his own with his brothers Troy and Kevin.

Carrier's third album, 1993's Dance All Night, was his biggest success.

Carrier has made guest appearances on albums by Tab Benoit – Live: Swampland Jam, Doug Kershaw – Cajun Sweet Home Louisiana, Calvin Owens – Stop Lying in My Face and Jimmy Thackery – Switching Gears.

Carrier's 2010 release Zydeco Junkie won the Grammy in the category Best Zydeco or Cajun Music Album.

== Personal life ==
Carrier is Catholic.

== Discography ==
- Go Zydeco Go (Jewel Records, 1989)
- Boogie Woogie Zydeco (Flying Fish Records, 1991)
- Dance All Night (Blind Pig Records, 1993)
- Who Stole the Hot Sauce? (Blind Pig Records, 1996)
- Too Hot to Handle (Louisiana Red Hot Records, 1999)
- It's Party Time (Right Click Records, 1999)
- Take Me to the Zydeco (Swampadelic Records, 2001)
- Ain't No Party Like a Chubby Party (Swampadelic Records, 2005)
- Bayou Road (Swampadelic Records, 2006)
- Live at Knuckleheads, Kansas City (Swampadelic Records, 2007)
- Zydeco Junkie (Swampadelic Records, 2010)
- Zydeco Stuff (Swampadelic Records, 2015)

== See also ==
Chubby Carrier and the Bayou Swamp Band
