= Grammy Award for Best Zydeco or Cajun Music Album =

Award presented to recording artists for quality zydeco or cajun music albums

- Awarded for: Quality zydeco or cajun music albums
- Country: United States
- Presented by: National Academy of Recording Arts and Sciences
- First award: 2008
- Final award: 2011
- Website: grammy.com

The Grammy Award for Best Zydeco or Cajun Music Album was an honor presented to recording artists at the 50th, 51st, 52nd and 53rd Annual Grammy Awards (2008–2011) for quality zydeco or cajun music albums. The Grammy Awards, an annual ceremony that was established in 1958 and originally called the Gramophone Awards, are presented by the National Academy of Recording Arts and Sciences of the United States to "honor artistic achievement, technical proficiency and overall excellence in the recording industry, without regard to album sales or chart position".

Beginning in 2001, advocates began lobbying for a Grammy category specifically for cajun and zydeco music. Award recipients, in chronological order, included Terrance Simien and the Zydeco Experience, BeauSoleil avec Michael Doucet, Buckwheat Zydeco, and Chubby Carrier and the Bayou Swamp Band; no artist received the award more than once. Awards were presented to the engineers, mixers, and/or producers in addition to the performing artists. The group Pine Leaf Boys holds the record for the most nominations, with four. Though nominated each year the honor was presented, the group failed to receive an award. Doucet and Cedric Watson each received three nominations. 2009 marked the only year in which a musician received more than one nomination as well as the only time two artists were nominated for works appearing on the same album—Doucet was nominated as a member of BeauSoleil for Live at the 2008 New Orleans Jazz & Heritage Festival as well as for his solo album From Now On, and Steve Riley and the Mamou Playboys were also nominated for their contribution to the New Orleans Jazz & Heritage Festival compilation album. Many nominated artists were from Louisiana, specifically Lafayette.

In 2011, the Academy announced the retirement of the award category. Beginning in 2012, zydeco or cajun recordings were eligible for the Best Regional Roots Music Album category.

== Background ==
According to Cody Daigle of The Daily Advertiser, advocates lobbied for nearly seven years in an attempt to create a Grammy category specifically for zydeco and cajun music. The effort was led by musician Terrance Simien, along with his wife and manager Cynthia. Mitch Landrieu, Lieutenant Governor of Louisiana at the time, also supported the effort. Cynthia, a trustee of the Memphis chapter of the Recording Academy, claimed hundreds of dollars and hours were invested in the lobbying effort she described as an "uphill battle". Prior to the Best Zydeco or Cajun Music category, works in the genre competed in the Best Contemporary Folk Album or Best Traditional Folk Album categories.

== Recipients ==
Year	Winner(s)	Title	Nominees	Ref.
2008	Terrance Simien and the Zydeco Experience	Live! Worldwide	Geno Delafose & French Rockin' Boogie for Le Cowboy Creole; Lisa Haley for King Cake; Lost Bayou Ramblers for Live: Á la Blue Moon; Pine Leaf Boys for Blues de Musicien; Racines for Racines; Roddie Romero and the Hub City All-Stars for The La Louisianne Sessions	
2009	BeauSoleil avec Michael Doucet	Live at the 2008 New Orleans Jazz & Heritage Festival	Michael Doucet for From Now On; Pine Leaf Boys for Homage Au Passé; Steve Riley and the Mamou Playboys for Live at the 2008 New Orleans Jazz & Heritage Festival; Cedric Watson for Cedric Watson	
2010	Buckwheat Zydeco	Lay Your Burden Down	BeauSoleil avec Michael Doucet for Alligator Purse; The Magnolia Sisters for Stripped Down; Pine Leaf Boys for Live at the 2009 New Orleans Jazz & Heritage Festival; Cedric Watson et Bijou Créole for L'Ésprit Créole	
2011	Chubby Carrier and the Bayou Swamp Band	Zydeco Junkie	Feufollet for En Couleurs; D.L. Menard for Happy Go Lucky; Pine Leaf Boys for Back Home; Cedric Watson et Bijou Créole for Creole Moon: Live at the Blue Moon Saloon	

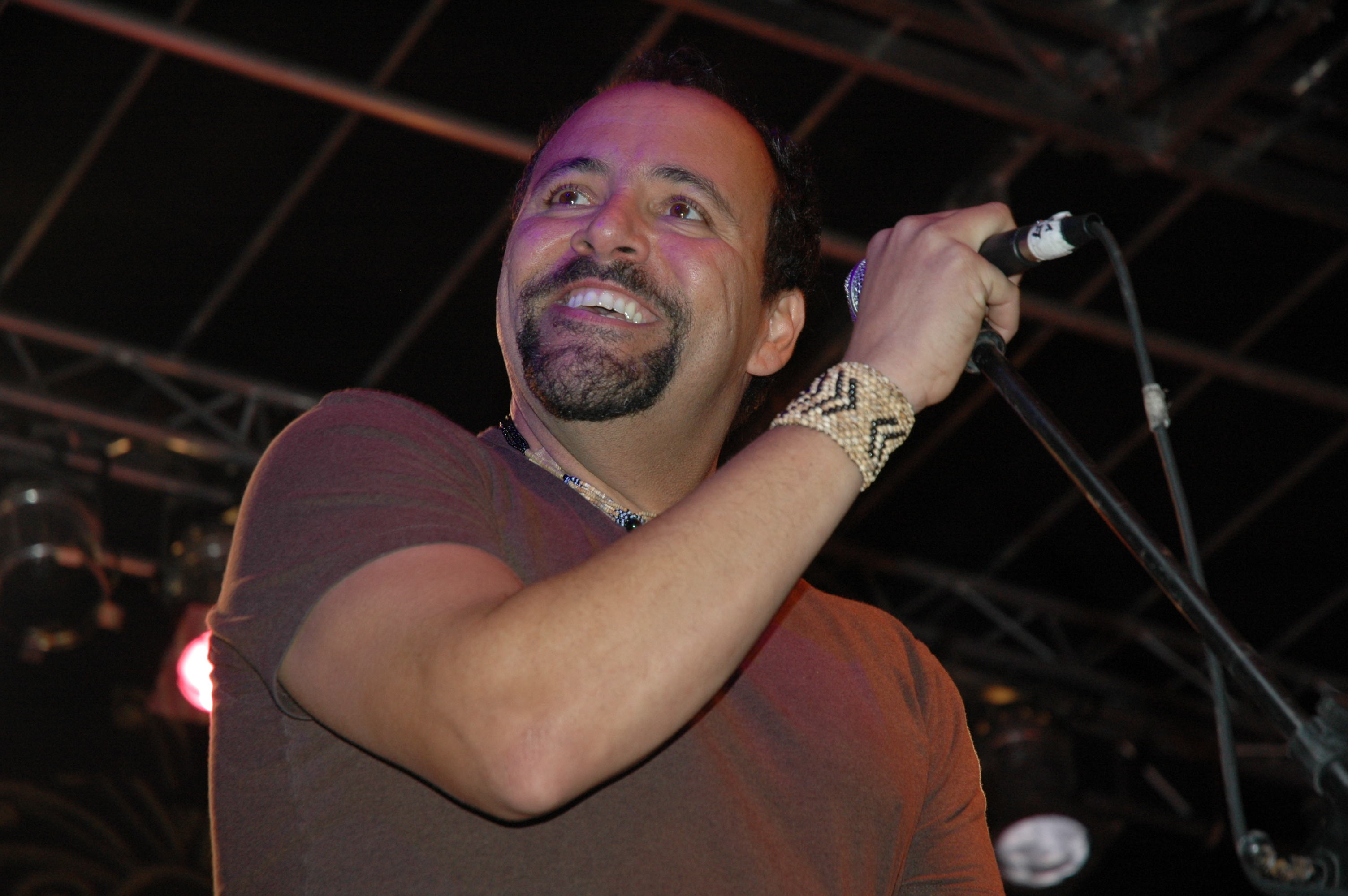
Terrance Simien of the 2008 award-winning band Terrance Simien and the Zydeco Experience, performing in 2008

For the 50th Annual Grammy Awards (2008), Best Zydeco or Cajun Music Album nominees included Geno Delafose & French Rockin' Boogie for Le Cowboy Creole, Lisa Haley for King Cake, The Lost Bayou Ramblers for Live: Á La Blue Moon, the French language cajun band Pine Leaf Boys for their second album Blues de Musicien, Racines for Racines, Roddie Romero and the Hub City All-Stars for The La Louisianne Sessions, and Terrance Simien and the Zydeco Experience for Live! Worldwide. Of the seven nominees, only one was based outside Lafayette, Louisiana. Le Cowboy Creole, Delafose's fifth album, contained cover versions of Chuck Berry's "Promised Land", the Commodores' "Easy", The Everly Brothers' "When Will I Be Loved", Ronnie Milsap's "(There's) No Gettin' Over Me", and Van Morrison's "Domino". Blues de Musician included a French adaptation of the country music song "The Wild Side of Life". Live! Worldwide contained recordings of live performances from around the world during Simien's 25-year career, including "The Star-Spangled Banner" and traditional songs such as "Zydeco Boogaloo" and Boozoo Chavis' "Uncle Bud". Simien and the Zydeco Experience performed as the opening act to the pre-telecast for the 50th Grammy Awards ceremony. The award was presented to Terrance Simien and the Zydeco Experience, members of which included Jose Alvarez, Ralph Fontenot, Keith Sonnier, William Terry, and Danny Williams. Joshua Murrell was also recognized as the engineer and producer of the album. Simien was described as "exuberant" during his acceptance speech in which he acknowledged the five other nominees. Simien and his band were also honored by Billboard, which ranked their live performance in support of the album as one of the top ten acts of the year.

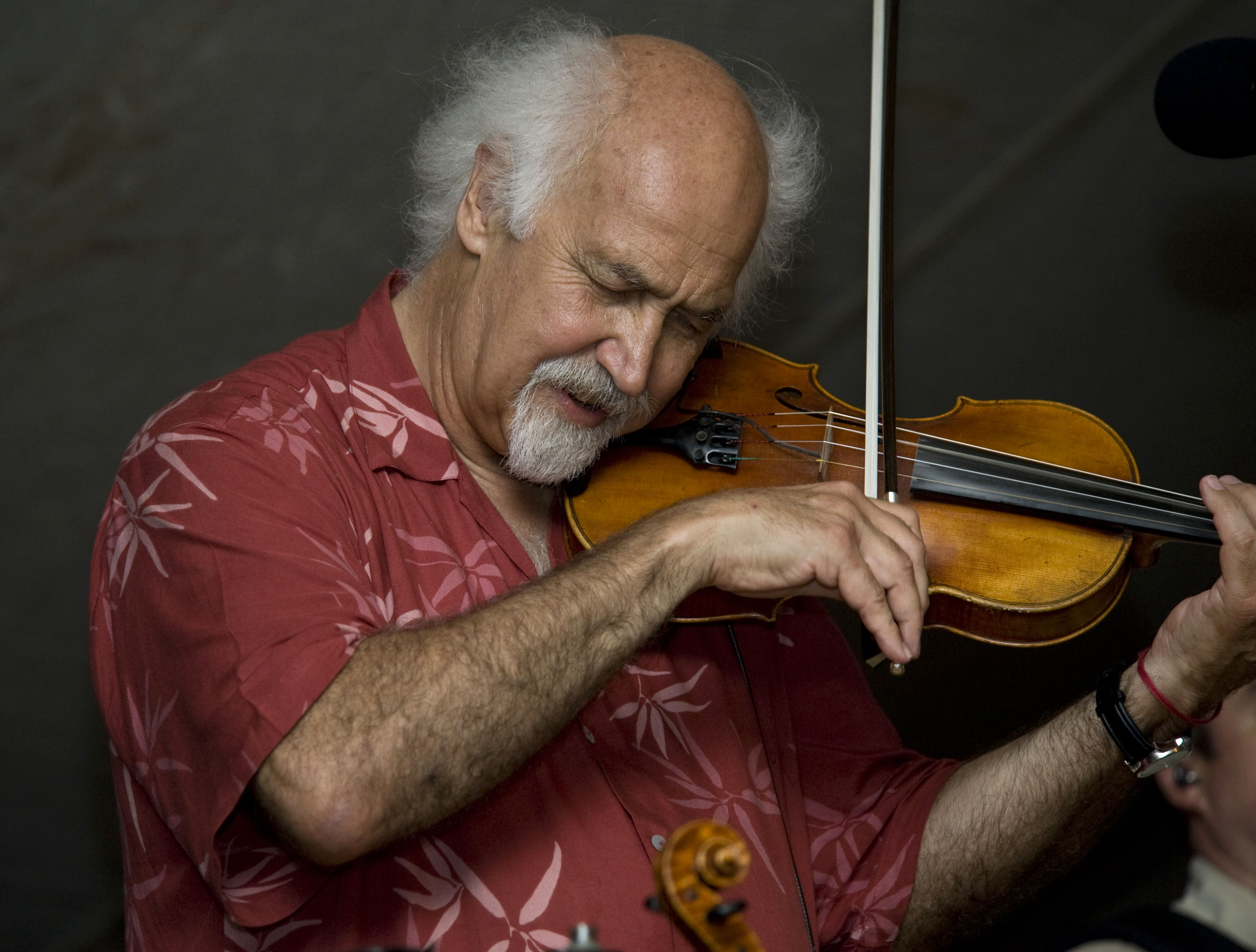
Michael Doucet of BeauSoleil, performing in 2008

2009 nominees included BeauSoleil avec Michael Doucet for Live at the 2008 New Orleans Jazz & Heritage Festival, Michael Doucet for From Now On, Pine Leaf Boys for Homage Au Passé, Steve Riley and the Mamou Playboys for Live at the 2008 New Orleans Jazz & Heritage Festival, and Cedric Watson for Cedric Watson. Doucet, the founder, lead singer and fiddler of BeauSoleil, is the only artist to receive more than one nomination for Best Zydeco or Cajun Music Album within the same year. According to Doucet, From Now On was recorded "live in three sessions with no rehearsals, overdubs, or song lists." The album contains original tracks, covers by Hoagy Carmichael and Allen Toussaint, and standards such as "St. Louis Blues" and "You Gotta Move". The award was presented to BeauSoleil avec Michael Doucet. Recipients included Doucet, band members Tommy Alesi, Jimmy Breaux, David Doucet, Mitchell Reed, Billy Ware, and Ben Williams, along with Eli Kelly and Woods Drinkwater as engineers. BeauSoleil's set was recorded in April 2008 and released with the group's approval without further involvement. According to Michael Doucet, the album "was on iTunes, and then all of a sudden it was nominated for a Grammy."

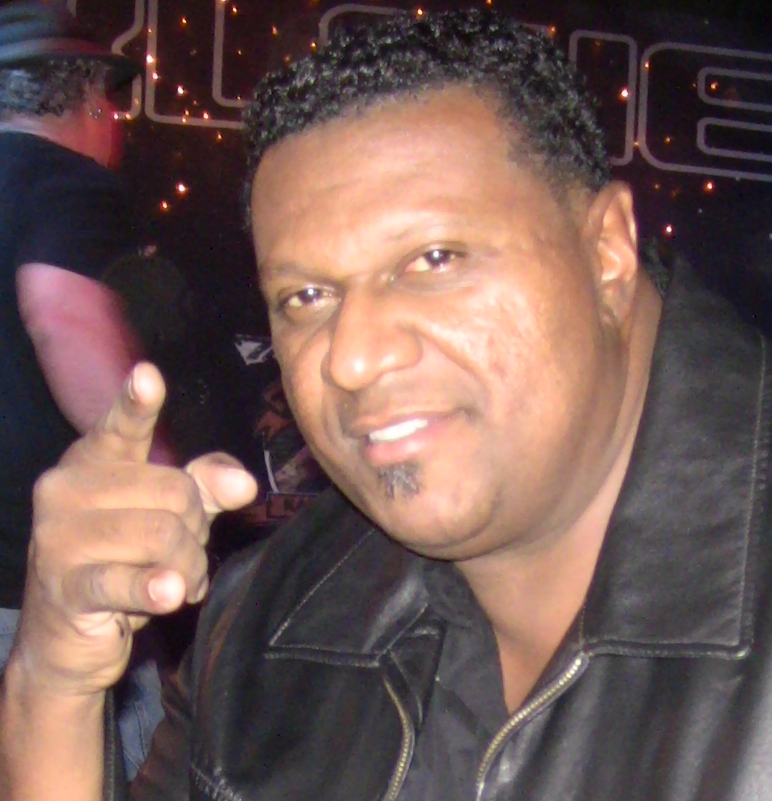
Chubby Carrier of the 2011 award-winning group Chubby Carrier and the Bayou Swamp Band in 2010

Nominees for the 52nd Annual Grammy Awards in 2010 included BeauSoleil avec Michael Doucet for Alligator Purse, Buckwheat Zydeco (stage name for Stanley Dural, Jr.) for Lay Your Burden Down, The Magnolia Sisters for Stripped Down, Pine Leaf Boys for Live at 2009 New Orleans Jazz & Heritage Festival, and Cedric Watson et Bijou Créole for L'Ésprit Créole. Alligator Purse included guest appearances by Garth Hudson of The Band, Natalie Merchant of 10,000 Maniacs, Roswell Rudd, and John Sebastian of The Lovin' Spoonful. Lay Your Burden Down reunited Dural with producer Steve Berlin and contained versions of Captain Beefheart's "Too Much Time", Jimmy Cliff's "Let Your Yeah Be Yeah", Gov't Mule's "Lay Your Burden Down", Memphis Minnie's "When the Levee Breaks", and Bruce Springsteen's "Back in Your Arms". Members of The Magnolia Sisters, an all-female cajun group of multi-instrumentalists, included Anya Burgess, Ann Savoy, Lisa Trahan and Jane Vidrine. The award was presented to Buckwheat Zydeco, members of which included Reginald Dural, Stanley "Buckwheat" Dural, Michael Melchione, Kevin Menard, Olivier Scoazec, Curtis Watson, and Lee Allen Zeno. David Farrell and Steven Maxwell Berlin were also honored as the engineer/mixer and producer of the album, respectively.

For the 53rd Annual Grammy Awards (2011), the nominees were Chubby Carrier and the Bayou Swamp Band for Zydeco Junkie, Feufollet for En Couleurs, D. L. Menard for Happy Go Lucky, the Pine Leaf Boys for Back Home, and Cedric Watson et Bijou Créole for Creole Moon: Live at the Blue Moon Saloon. 2011 marked the fourth consecutive nomination for the Pine Leaf Boys. Group member Wilson Savoy was unable to attend the award ceremony, but admitted the nominations have "acted as vindication" of their "new-traditionalist sound". Zydeco Junkie, released through Carrier's own record label Swampadelic Records, featured his "trademark party songs" and an "accordion-flavored" cover of "Movin' On Up", the theme song for the television series The Jeffersons. Geno Delafose and Jamie Bergeron made guest appearances on the album. The award was presented to Chubby Carrier and the Bayou Swamp Band.

== Category retirement ==
In 2011, the category Best Zydeco or Cajun Music Album was eliminated along with thirty others due to a major overhaul by the Recording Academy. Four additional categories in the American Roots Music field were eliminated (Best Contemporary Folk Album, Best Hawaiian Music Album, Best Native American Music Album, Best Traditional Folk Album). Zydeco and cajun works became eligible for the Best Regional Roots Music Album category. Chubby Carrier was reportedly "broken-hearted" by the news, and concerned that the category's elimination would not give the music genre the attention deserved. Carrier stated: "This category inspired musicians to fight for the music. It strengthened us. I'd say to all the young zydeco musicians out there; don't give up this fight." Simien also expressed sadness and called the elimination "a disappointment for local music". Showing signs of optimism, Terrance Simien said: "The category might be gone today, but we'll get it back."

== See also ==
- Cajun French Music Association
- History of Cajun music
- List of people related to Cajun music
- Music of Louisiana
- Zydeco (dance)
