= Hurricane on the Bayou =

2006 documentary film by Greg MacGillivray

- The theatrical poster for Hurricane on the Bayou.
- Directed by: Greg MacGillivray
- Written by: Glen Pitre
- Produced by: Greg MacGillivray; Anne Marie Hammers; Glen Pitre
- Starring: Meryl Streep; Allen Toussaint; Tab Benoit; Chubby Carrier; Amanda Shaw
- Narrated by: Meryl Streep
- Cinematography: Brad Ohlund
- Edited by: Jim Foster; Neguine Samani
- Production company: MacGillivray Freeman Films
- Distributed by: IMAX
- Release date: 2006
- Running time: 42 minutes
- Country: United States
- Language: English

Hurricane on the Bayou is an American 2006 documentary film that focuses on the wetlands of Louisiana before and after Hurricane Katrina.

Hurricane on the Bayou is both a documentary of Hurricane Katrina's effects and a call to restore Louisiana's wetlands, rebuild New Orleans, and honor the culture of the city. The film is narrated by actress Meryl Streep and driven by a jazz-, blues-, Cajun-, and gospel-fueled soundtrack featuring Tab Benoit, Amanda Shaw, Mavis Staples, and Allen Toussaint.

It was originally a "what-if" scenario about a major hurricane impacting New Orleans – prior to Hurricane Katrina. The film debuted at the Entergy IMAX in New Orleans, on the one-year anniversary of Hurricane Katrina, several months before being shown elsewhere.

== Synopsis ==
The film begins in the bayou itself, as a family of alligators frolic in the water to the tune of the Cajun classic "Iko Iko". The story then sets off on an historical exploration of how New Orleans rose up hundreds of years ago out of an untamed swampland – and went on to become celebrated around the world as "The Big Easy", a place where a feeling of joyful freedom permeated the music, the food and the city's inimitable talent for turning "good times" into an art form. Here, a spicy gumbo of African, Native American, Cajun, Creole and Southern influences forged a unique culture. Louisiana's coastal location (the state contains 40% of all the coastal wetlands in the continental U.S. according to the National Wetlands Research Center) was both a boon and a bane to the city. New Orleans evolved into the busiest port in the U.S., but after engineers diverted the Mississippi River, depleting the wetlands, the city became increasingly vulnerable to the killer winds and rising waters of seasonal hurricanes.

Today, the situation grows more and more dangerous as every year Louisiana loses enough land to make up the island of Manhattan. Setting out for the mystery-tinged bayous with Tab Benoit and Amanda Shaw, Hurricane on the Bayou reveals how in the last 50 years, the natural coastal buffer that once sheltered New Orleans from severe storms has drastically deteriorated, endangering many unique animal and plant species and leaving the city wide open to Mother Nature's ferocious forces. Spectacular flights over the Gulf of Mexico reveal the shocking reality that every half an hour, Louisiana loses a section of wetlands the size of a football field. Meanwhile, a side-trip into the vibrant swamplands probes how the bayou provides a fragile home to a family of alligators with newborn babies. Here, Tab Benoit explains that hope for New Orleans' future will lie in concerted efforts to not only preserve but restore these wetlands by redirecting the Mississippi River's silt and re-planting vital foliage.

Ultimately, the story builds to the monster storm that was Katrina and the crisis it brought to New Orleans, causing families to be separated, homes to be lost and one hundred square miles of wetlands and marshes to be destroyed by saltwater (including damaged caused by Hurricane Rita). Visceral, state-of-the-art CGI effects created by Hollywood specialists Sassoon Film Design recreates the fury of the storm, when fierce winds tore off the roof of the Superdome. Then, haunting, never-before-seen 70mm footage of the storm's aftermath provides a shocking reminder of just how vast the storm's devastation really was. Finally, returning to New Orleans in the bittersweet 2006 Mardi Gras season, the film reveals a city in the first throes of recovery – and reunites Allen Toussaint, Amanda Shaw, Chubby Carrier and Marva Wright for a passionate performance of a resonant modern hymn (written by the film's composer Steve Wood) in the oldest Cathedral in North America, New Orleans' elegant St. Louis Cathedral.

== Soundtrack ==
The music, produced by the Audubon Nature Institute, includes performances of the jazz, blues and gospel that appeared in the film, as well as samples of Dixieland and other pieces by Fats Domino, Chubby Carrier, and the Neville Brothers. Proceeds go to the Audubon Nature Institute. Though the film does not have a designated soundtrack, the film uses music samples from each of the musicians in the film. Iconic south Louisiana songs, such as "Iko Iko," are also used in the documentary to place more emphasis on how cultured south Louisiana is. A Cajun theme generally influences each song.

Hurricane on the Bayou introduces four New Orleans musicians: singer, songwriter, pianist, producer, and Rock 'n Roll Hall of Fame inductee Allen Toussaint; Cajun Blues guitarist and wetlands activist Tab Benoit; teenaged fiddling virtuoso and rising musician Amanda Shaw; and the man who discovered Amanda and helped produce her first album, zydeco accordionist Chubby Carrier. Each has a story to tell about their love for Louisiana and their loss during Katrina.

== Funding ==
Funders of the film included Chevron Corporation, Dow Chemical, and Dominion Exploration and Production.

== Awards ==
In 2007, Hurricane on the Bayou was nominated for a Golden Reel Award in Sound Editing.

== See also ==
- Audubon Nature Institute (based in New Orleans in the US)
- Bayou
