= Live at the 2008 New Orleans Jazz & Heritage Festival =

Live album by BeauSoleil avec Michael Doucet
- Released: May 15, 2008
- Recorded: April 27, 2008
- Genre: Cajun; Zydeco
- Label: MunckMix

Live at the 2008 New Orleans Jazz & Heritage Festival is a live album by BeauSoleil avec Michael Doucet, released in 2009 through MunckMix Records. In 2010, the album earned BeauSoleil the Grammy Award for Best Zydeco or Cajun Music Album.

== Track listing ==
No.	Title	Length
1.	"Me and Dennis McGee"	5:04
2.	"J'ai Ete Au Bal"	5:40
3.	"KLFY TV Waltz"	4:27
4.	"L'amour Ou La Follie"	5:46
5.	"Freeman's Zydeco"	4:13
6.	"La Terre De Mon Grandpere"	3:34
7.	"Bye-Bye Boozoo"	3:59
8.	"New Orleans 1786"	5:51
9.	"Happy One Step"	4:12
Total length:		42:47

== Personnel ==
The album features the BeauSoleil avec Michael Doucet. At the time of recording, these members included Michael Doucet, Tommy Alesi, Jimmy Breaux, David Doucet, Mitchell Reed, Billy Ware, Ben Williams. Also, Eli Kelly & Woods Drinkwater, are credited as engineers in the Grammy Award.
