= Ray Baker (actor) =

American actor (born 1948)

- Born: July 9, 1948 (age 77); Omaha, Nebraska, U.S.
- Occupation: Actor
- Years active: 1972–present
- Spouses: Patricia Richardson (m. 1982; div. 1995) Colleen Dodson (m. 1997)
- Children: 3

Ray Baker (born July 9, 1948) is an American theater, television and film actor. Baker was born in Omaha, Nebraska. He is a longtime character actor with over 100 credits on television and film. Baker is credited either as Ray or Raymond. He grew up in Denver, Colorado, and graduated from the University of Denver, before moving to New York and living and working there for twenty years. Baker appeared on and off Broadway and in regional theatre. He currently lives in Los Angeles, is married to actress and playwright Colleen Dodson, and continues working in theatre, movies, and television.

== Personal life ==
Baker married actress Patricia Richardson in 1982. They had three children together: Henry Richardson Baker (born February 22, 1985), and twins Roxanne Elizabeth Baker and Joe Castle Baker (born January 3, 1991), before they divorced in 1995. He married another actress, Colleen Dodson-Baker, in 1997.

== Filmography ==
=== Film ===
Ray Baker film credits
Year	Title	Role	Notes
1972	Parades	1st CID Man	Uncredited
1980	Gloria	Assistant Bank Manager	Raymond Baker
1983	Silkwood	Pete Dawson	
1984	C.H.U.D.	Ad Man	Raymond Baker
1984	Places in the Heart	Sheriff Royce Spalding	
1985	Silverado	Ethan McKendrick	
1988	Everybody's All-American	Bolling Kiely	
1988	Rain Man	Mr. Kelso	
1989	Physical Evidence	Strickler	
1990	Heart Condition	Harry Zara	
1990	Total Recall	Bob McClane	
1990	Masters of Menace	Riley Hoover	
1993	Hexed	Victor Thummell	
1993	Freaked	Bill Blazer	
1994	The Hard Truth	Hamilton Nichols	
1994	Camp Nowhere	Norris Prescott	
1994	Ed Wood	Doctor	
1994	On Hope	Phillip	(Short)
1994	Speechless	Garvin	
1995	The Final Cut	Colonel Forsyth	
1996	Executive Decision	747 Captain	
1997	Living in Peril	Martin Campbell	
1997	A Thousand Acres	Wallace Crockett	
1998	Hard Rain	The Mayor	
1999	Anywhere but Here	Ted	
1999	Girl, Interrupted	Carl Kaysen	
2000	What Lies Beneath	Dr. Stan Powell	
2001	Sweet November	Buddy Leach	
2002	The Trip	Peter Baxter	
2003	Holes	Assistant Attorney General	
2004	Without a Paddle	Sheriff Briggs	
2004	The Last Run	Mr. Powers	
2005	Coach Carter	St. Francis Coach	
2017	The Keeping Hours	Lenn	
2018	Yegua	Dr. De La Cruz	

=== Television ===
Ray Baker television credits
Year	Title	Role	Notes
1977	Eleanor and Franklin: The White House Years	James Roosevelt	TV movie
1978	Ryan's Hope	Officer Malloy	2 episodes
1981	Dream House	Steve Corcoran	TV movie
1982	The Neighborhood	Reporter	TV movie
1984	Double Trouble	Announcer	Episode: "One Drives, the Other Doesn't"
1986	Rockabye	Donald F. Donald	TV movie
1986	Spenser: For Hire	Matt Wilson	Episode: "In a Safe Place"
1986	Nobody's Child	Joe Balter	TV movie
1986	Taking It Home	Johnny	TV movie
1985–1986	The Equalizer	Dana Caldrin	3 episodes "The Lock Box" (S1.E4) "Desperately" (S1.E11) "Dead Drop" (S1.E15)
1987	At Mother's Request	Mike George	miniseries
1987	American Playhouse	Dan Morgan	Episode: "Stacking"
1987	The Cosby Show	Mr. Schrader	Episode: "Calling Doctor Huxtable"
1987	ABC Afterschool Specials	Dr. Thomas Crandall	Episode: "Supermom's Daughter"
1987	The Long Journey Home	Grey Harrison	TV movie
1987	Leg Work	Douglas J. Hewitt	Episode: "Mystery Woman"
1988	TerrorVision	Frank	
1988	Heartbeat	Dr. Stan Gorshalk	6 episodes
1988	Disaster at Silo 7	Colonel Chadwick	TV movie
1989	Parent Trap III	Nick	TV movie
1989	Booker	Raymond Crane	Episode: "Wheels and Deals: Part 1"
1989	21 Jump Street	Raymond Crane	Episode: "Wheels and Deals: Part 2"
1990	She Said No	Frank Igus	TV movie
1990–1991	Down Home	Wade Prescott	19 episodes
1992	In Sickness and in Health	Sam	TV movie
1992	Her Final Fury: Betty Broderick, the Last Chapter	Jack Earley	TV movie
1993	River of Rage: The Taking of Maggie Keene	Coy Baron	TV movie
1993	Kung Fu: The Legend Continues	Paul Caldrin	Episode: "I Never Promised You a Rose Garden"
1991–1994	Home Improvement	Inspector / Tool Time Audience member	2 episodes
1994	Under Suspicion	Chief Jack DeSort	
1994	Locals		TV movie
1995	The Secretary	Lester Howland	TV movie
1995	Never Say Never: The Deidre Hall Story	Deidre's First Husband	TV movie
1996	A Friend's Betrayal	Robert (uncredited)	TV movie
1996	The Tomorrow Man	Berman	TV movie
1996	Dark Angel		TV movie
1996	She Cried No	Mark Baker	TV movie
1996	Assault on Dome 4	Chief of Staff Dan Block	TV movie
1997	Echo	Stu Fishman	TV movie
1997	Perfect Body	Elliot Bradley	TV movie
1997	Murder, She Wrote: South by Southwest	Wilder	TV movie
1996–1997	Suddenly Susan	Bill Keane	3 episodes
1998	Oklahoma City: A Survivor's Story	Roy Salyers	TV movie
1997–1998	Cybill	Dr. Richard Thorpe	11 episodes
1999	Pensacola: Wings of Gold	Pearly	Episode: "Fox Two"
2000	The West Wing	Jonathan Lydell	Episode: "Take Out the Trash Day"
2000	Ali: An American Hero		TV movie
2000	3rd Rock from the Sun	Mr. Demarmel	Episode: "Why Dickie Can't Teach
2001	Area 52	Falcone	TV movie
2001	Crossing Jordan	FBI Agent / Major	Episode: "Sight Unseen"
2002	First Monday		Episode: :The Price of Liberty"
2002	Diagnosis Murder: Town Without Pity	Johny	TV movie
2002	Days of Our Lives	Frank Daniels	Episode #1.9366
2002	The American Embassy		Episode: "Agent Provocateur"
2003	The Shield	Detective Tom Gannon	Episode: "Co-pilot"
2003	44 Minutes: The North Hollywood Shoot-Out	Harris	TV movie
2003	The Guardian	Albert Aaronson	Episode: "The Father-Daughter Dance
2001-2004	JAG	Major General Finstra / Admiral Hollenbeck	2 episodes
2005	Cold Case	Brian	Episode: "Revolution"
2005	Alien Siege	The President	TV movie
2005	Path of Destruction		TV movie
2003–2005	Without a Trace	Victor Fitzgerald	3 episodes
2006	Numb3rs	Jack Bennett	Episode: "Protest"
2006	Criminal Minds	Bruno Hawks	Episode: "Secrets and Lies"
2006	ER	Durant	Episode: "Ames v. Kovac"
2007	Claire	Sheriff Birch	TV movie
2007	Cane	Randall Eames 2007	Episode: "The Two Alex Vegas"
2007	Bones	Daniel Dillon	Episode: "Boy in the Time Capsule"
2008	Heroes	Mr. Millbrook	Episode: "The Eclipse"
2015	House of Lies	Cal Manchester	Episode: "The Urge To..."
2016	Animal Kingdom	Isaiah	Episode: "Goddam Animals"
2017	Love at First Glance	John Landers	TV movie

== Theatre ==
Ray Baker Theatre credits
Year	Title	Role	Notes
1982–1985	Torch Song Trilogy	Ed	
1982	Is there life after high school?		
1981–1983	Crimes of the Heart	Doc Porter	
1980	Division Street	Chris	
1979	Are You Now or Have You Ever Been	Larry Parks	
