= Lisa Haley =

Lisa Haley may refer to:

- Lisa Haley (ice hockey)
- Lisa Haley (musician)
