= Amanda Shaw =

American Cajun fiddler and singer

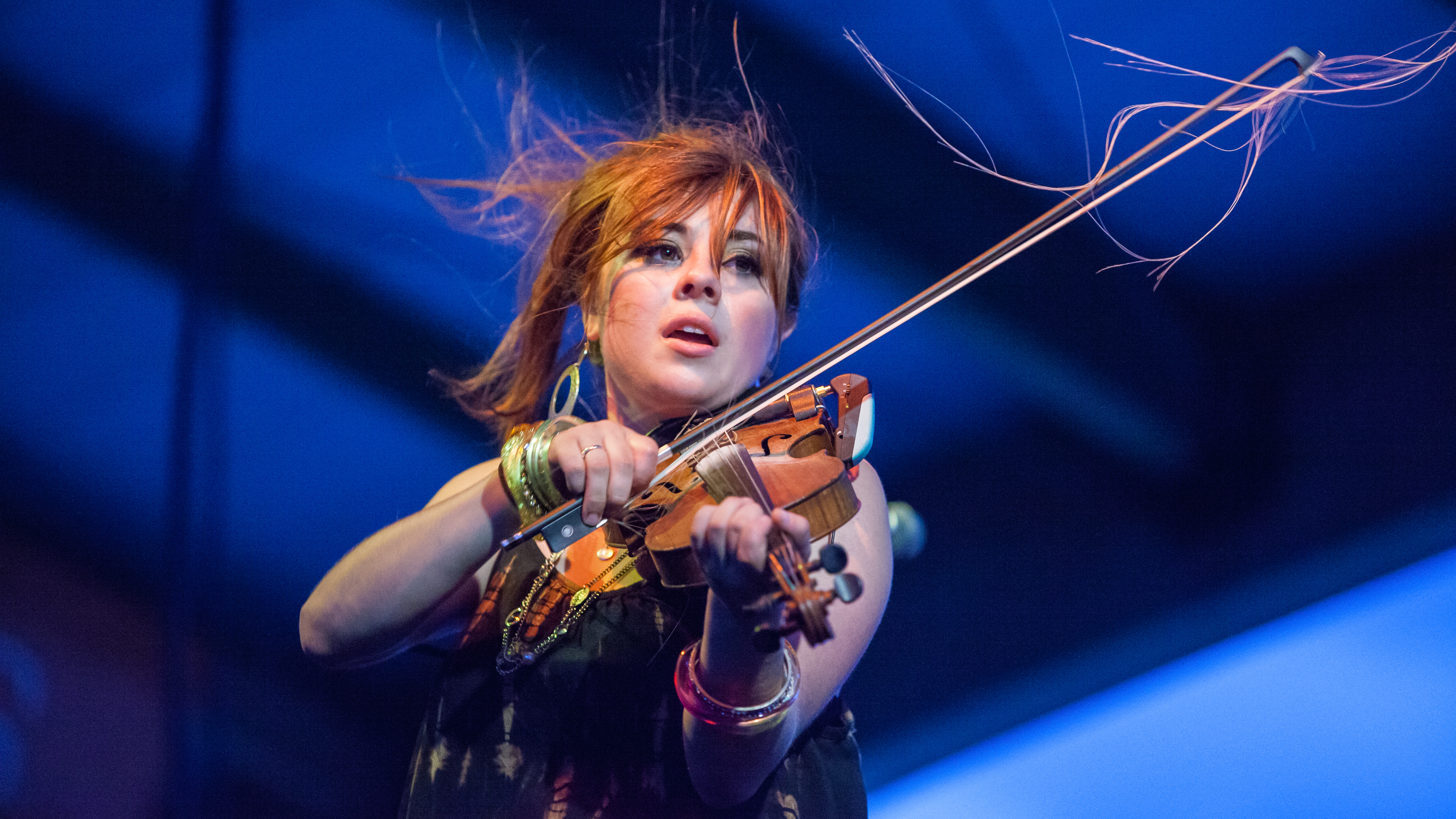
- Shaw in 2013

Background information
- Born: Amanda Christian Amaya-Shaw; August 2, 1990 (age 35); Boston, Massachusetts, U.S.
- Genres: Pop, Cajun, rock
- Occupations: Singer, musician
- Instruments: Fiddle, vocals
- Years active: 2001–present
- Label: Rounder
- Website: amandashaw.com

Amanda Christian Amaya-Shaw (born August 2, 1990) is an American Cajun fiddler and singer from Mandeville, Louisiana. She was inducted into the Louisiana Music Hall of Fame in 2020.

== Musical training ==
Shaw received some of her early musical training in Southeastern Louisiana University's Community Music School. She studied classical violin starting at age 4, and at 8 began playing and performing Cajun music.

Shaw would have graduated from Mount Carmel Academy in New Orleans in 2008 but she opted instead to continue traveling around the country to perform. Shaw earned her G.E.D. in 2008 and planned to attend Tulane University but did not enroll.

== Performances ==
Shaw and her band, The Cute Guys, regularly perform to audiences around the world. They have toured North America, South America, and Europe. Amanda Shaw & the Cute Guys are a staple at the New Orleans Jazz and Heritage Festival, performing annually. Shaw was a featured New Orleans performer on Dick Clark's New Year's Rockin' Eve in 2020 as well as on CNN's New Year's Eve with Don Lemon in 2018, 2019, and 2021.

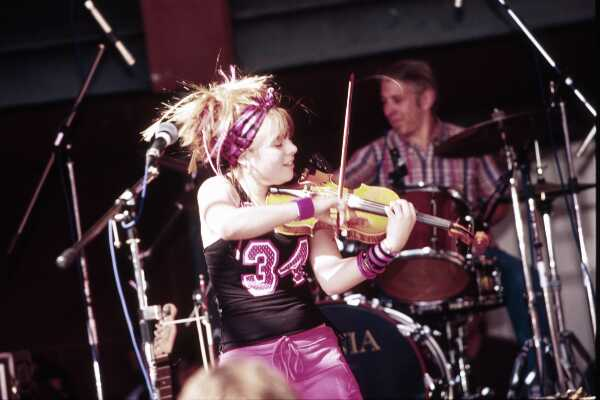
Shaw performs at the French Quarter festival in New Orleans in April 2007

== Recordings and videos ==
Shaw has recorded two independently released albums, Little Black Dog (2001) and I'm Not a Bubble Gum Pop Princess (2004) – the latter including traditional Cajun melodies as well as eclectic choices like The Clash's "Should I Stay or Should I Go" and The Ramones' "I Wanna Be Your Boyfriend" (changed to "Girlfriend"). In 2006 Shaw signed with Rounder Records. Two years later she released her third album, Pretty Runs Out, on Rounder.

Shaw has appeared in two Disney Channel original movies filmed in New Orleans: Stuck in the Suburbs (2004) and Now You See It... (2005). One of her best-known screen roles is as a principal narrator in Hurricane on the Bayou (2006), a documentary about Hurricane Katrina and the erosion of Louisiana's wetlands. Her music is featured in Hurricane along with that of co-narrator Tab Benoit and New Orleans native Allen Toussaint.

She also hosted the annual The Amanda Shaw Cajun Christmas Special on WGNO from 2017 to 2021.

== Discography ==
- Little Black Dog (2001)
- I'm Not a Bubble Gum Pop Princess (2004)
- Pretty Runs Out (2008)
- Good Southern Girl (2010)
- Please, Call Me Miss Shaw (2018)
- Joie (2020)

== Other source ==
- Judy Bergeron, Magic fills movie shot in N.O.; Covington teen says Disney gig's "really cool", Baton Rouge Advocate, January 14, 2005
