= Take It Easy, Baby =

Studio album by Buckwheat Zydeco
- Released: 1980
- Length: 37:40
- Label: Blues Unlimited
- Producer: Mark Miller

Buckwheat Zydeco chronology
One for the Road (1979)	Take It Easy, Baby (1980)	People's Choice (1982)

Take It Easy, Baby is Buckwheat Zydeco's second album, credited to his band at the time, Buckwheat Zydeco Ils Sont Partis Band. Ils Sont Partis is French for 'They're Off!', used by horse race announcers at the start of a race. Like his debut release, One for the Road, it was released on J.D. Miller's Blues Unlimited label in 1980. All of the tracks were written by Buckwheat Zydeco, credited to his birth name, Stanley Dural.

== Critical reception ==
John Broven described Take It Easy, Baby as "a polished, more soul-oriented production" compared to Buckwheat Zydeco's previous album, One for the Road.

== Track listing ==
All tracks are written by Buckwheat Zydeco, as Stanley Dural.

No.	Title	Length
1.	"Rockin' with the Blues"	2:49
2.	"Everybody's Talkin'"	5:00
3.	"Josephine Is Not My Lady"	4:07
4.	"Two for the Road"	3:33
5.	"It's Alright Tonite"	3:57
6.	"What a Price I Had to Pay"	4:00
7.	"Funkin' Zydeco"	3:40
8.	"Easy Easy"	3:10
9.	"Party Down"	3:59
10.	"Take It Easy, Baby"	3:25
Total length:		37:40

== Personnel ==
- Buckwheat Zydeco – Vocals (French and English), accordion, piano, Clavinet, and organ
- Lee Allen Zeno – Bass
- Nat Jolliviette – Drums
- Russell Gordon – Guitar
- John Bell – Saxophone
- Ernest Johnson – Washboard

Personnel and track list information obtained from AllMusic.
