= Feufollet =

American band

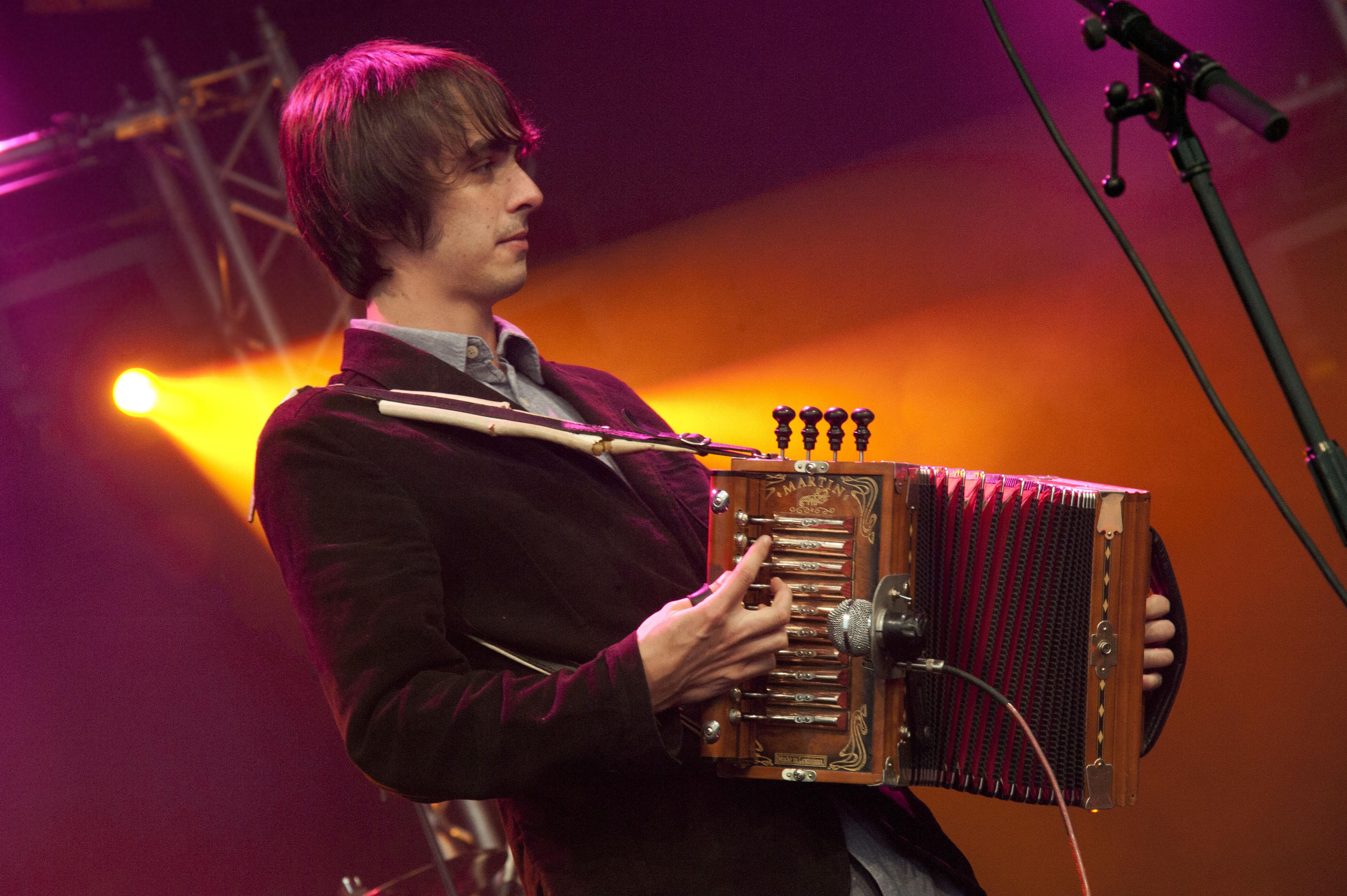

Background information
- Origin: Lafayette, Louisiana, United States
- Genres: Americana, Cajun, zydeco, country rock
- Labels: Valcour Records
- Members: Philippe Billeaudeaux; Kelli Jones-Savoy; Chris SeguraMike Stafford; Andrew Toups
- Past members: Anna Laura Edmiston; Chris Stafford
- Website: feufollet.net

Feufollet is an Americana/Cajun band from Lafayette, Louisiana.

== History ==
=== Formation ===
The band formed in 1995.

=== Awards ===
The band has been recognized through awards including receiving a nomination for the Grammy Award for Best Zydeco or Cajun Music Album for its album En Couleurs (2010). It also received the Big Easy Award for "Best Cajun Band".

=== Personnel ===
Singer and rhythm guitarist Anna Laura Edmiston—a member of the band since 2003—left the band in 2012 to pursue other interests. She was replaced by Kelli Jones-Savoy.

Founding member Chris Stafford unexpectedly died on May 2, 2024.

== Members ==
- Philippe Billeaudeaux
- Kelli Jones-Savoy
- Chris Segura
- Chris Stafford (d. 2024)
- Mike Stafford
- Andrew Toups

== Discography ==
=== Studio albums ===
- La Bande Feufollet (1999)
- Belle Louisiane (2001)
- Tout Un Beau Soir (2004)
- Cow Island Hop (2008) Valcour Records
- En Couleurs (2010)
- Two Universes (2015)
- Baby's On Fire - single (2018?) Valcour Records

=== Collaboration albums ===
- Color Sessions (2011)
- En Francais: Cajun 'n' Creole Rock 'n' Roll Various, produced by Louis Michot of Lost Bayou Ramblers (2011) Bayou Teche Brewery/CD Baby

== See also ==
- List of people related to Cajun music
- Music of Louisiana
