= Chubby Carrier and the Bayou Swamp Band =

Louisiana quintuplet band

Chubby Carrier And The Bayou Swamp Band
- Origin: Louisiana
- Genres: Zydeco
- Years active: 1989–present
- Label: Swampadelic
- Members: Chubby Carrier; Earl Sally; Randy Ellis; Dave (Papa Puff) Nezat; Mark M. Metoyer
- Website: www.chubbycarrier.com

Chubby Carrier And The Bayou Swamp Band is a Zydeco band from Louisiana founded by Chubby Carrier in 1989.

== Career ==
In 2016, Chubby Carrier & The Bayou Swamp Band appeared as performers in Jambalaya, the Musical, a stage production celebrating Louisiana culture and music, which premiered at the Orpheum Theater in New Orleans for a seven-day run.

== Awards ==
Chubby Carrier And The Bayou Swamp Band have a Grammy award for Best Zydeco or Cajun Music Album for their album Zydeco Junkie. Also, they won Best Zydeco Album Award from Offbeat magazine for the same album.

== Discography ==
- Blackpot (Swampadelic Records, 2018)
- Back to My Roots (Swampadelic Records, 2013)
- Rockin With Roy (Swampadelic Records, 2012)
- Zydeco Junkie (Swampadelic Records, 2010)
- Live at Knuckleheads, Kansas City (Swampadelic Records, 2007)
- Bayou Road (Swampadelic Records, 2006)
- Ain't No Party Like a Chubby Party (Swampadelic Records, 2005)
- Take Me to the Zydeco (Swampadelic Records, 2001)
- It's Party Time (Right Click Records, 1999)
- Too Hot to Handle (Gulf Coast Entertainment Co. LLC, 1998)
- Who Stole the Hot Sauce? (Blind Pig Records, 1996)
- Dance All Night (Blind Pig Records, 1993)
- Boogie Woogie Zydeco (Flying Fish Records, 1991)
- Go Zydeco Go (Jewel Records, 1989)
