= Terrance Simien and the Zydeco Experience =

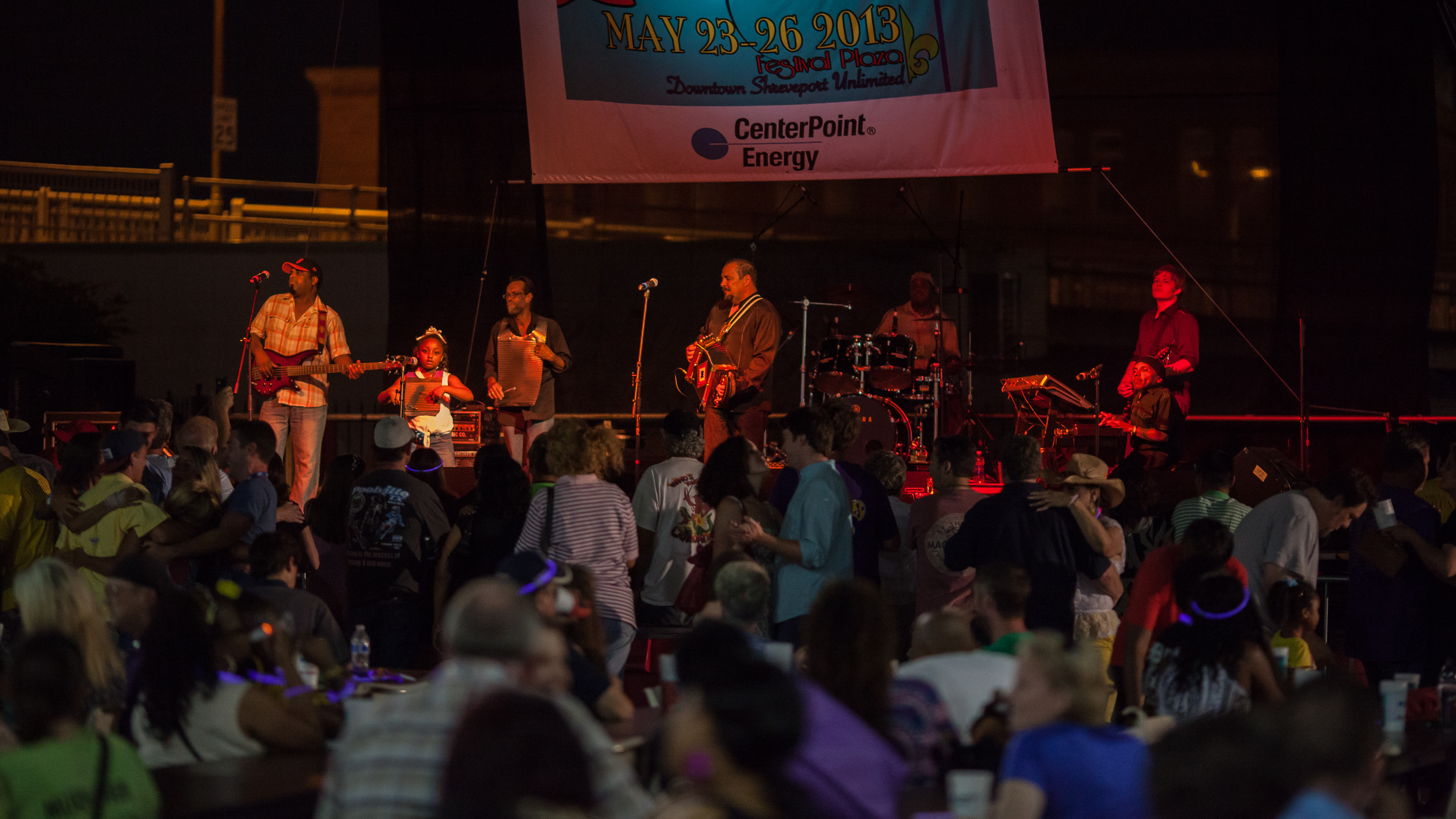
- The Zydeco Experience in 2013

Background information
- Origin: Louisiana
- Genres: Zydeco
- Labels: Restless Records; Tone Cool; AIM Records; Beadhead Records; Black Top Records
- Website: www.terrancesimien.com

Terrance Simien and the Zydeco Experience is a Zydeco band from Louisiana led by Terrance Simien.

== Awards ==
Terrance Simien and the Zydeco Experience won a Grammy award for Best Zydeco or Cajun Music Album for their album Live! Worldwide.

== Discography ==
- Zydeco On the Bayou (Restless Records, 1990)
- There's Room For Us All (Black Top Records, 1993)
- Jam The Jazzfest (Valley Media, Inc, 1998)
- Positively Beadhead (Tone Cool, 1999)
- The Tribute Sessions (AIM Records, 2004)
- Creole For Kidz (Beadhead Records, 2004)
- Across the Parish Line (AIM Records, 2006)
- Live! Worldwide (Aim Records, 2007)
- Dockside Sessions (2014)

== Band members ==
=== Current members ===
- Stan Chambers - bass
- Danny Williams - Keyboards, Musical Director
- Ian Molinaro-Thompson - Drums
- Noah Boshra - Saxophone
- Michael Christie - Trumpet

=== Former members ===
- Mitch Marine
- Richard Trahan
- Dowell Davis
- Taylor Gaurisco
- Keith Sonnier
- Russ Broussard
- Jose Alvarez
