= Terrance Simien =

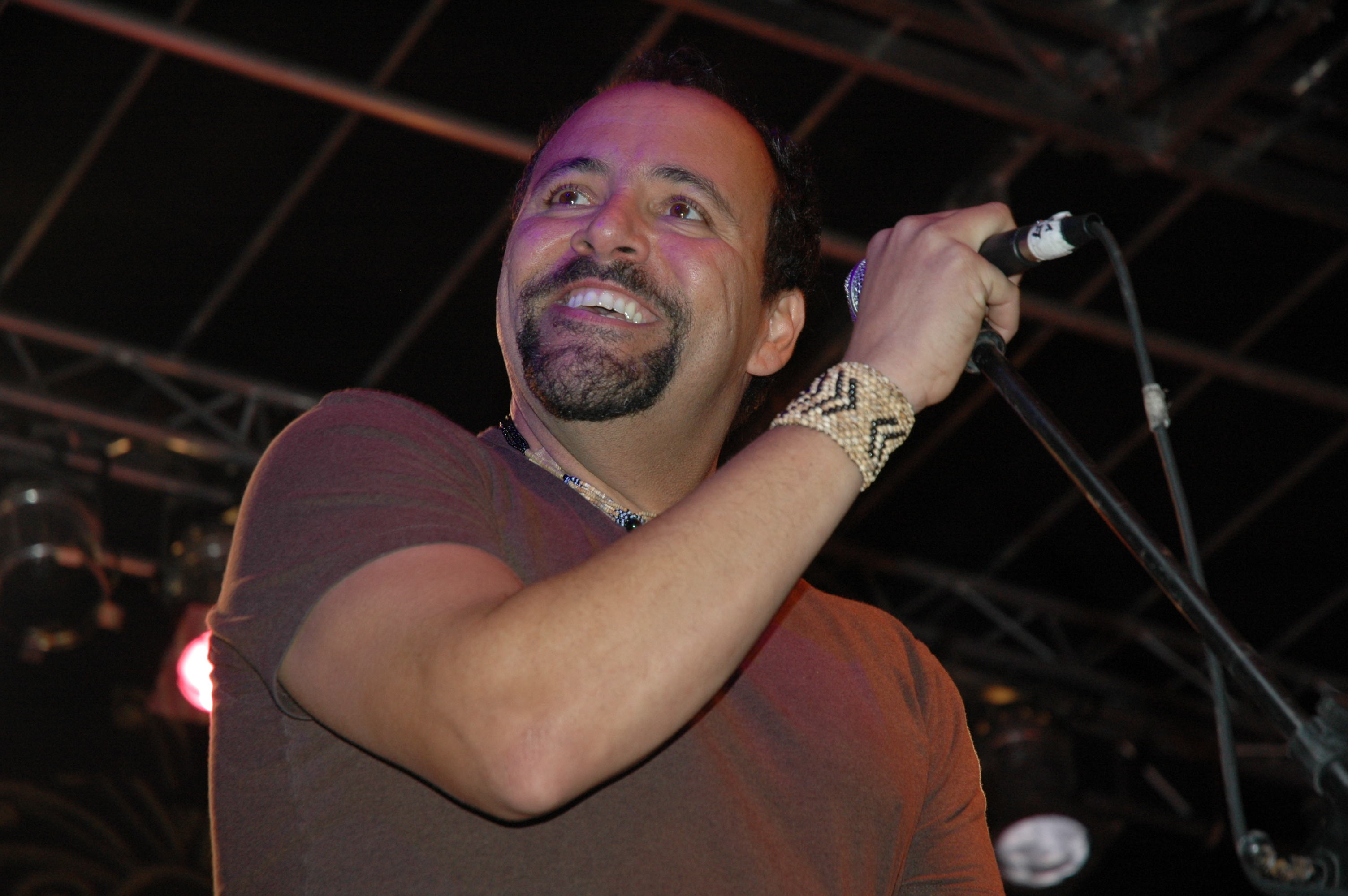
- Simien performing in February 2008

Background information
- Born: 3 September 1965 (age 61); Mallet, Louisiana, U.S
- Genres: Zydeco, roots music, Americana
- Occupations: Musician, Educator, Film scorer
- Instruments: Vocals, piano, accordion, trumpet
- Labels: Restless Records; Tone Cool; AIM Records; Beadhead Records; Black Top Records
- Member of: Terrance Simien and the Zydeco Experience
- Website: Terrance Simien homepage

Terrance Simien (born September 3, 1965) is an American zydeco musician, vocalist and songwriter. He and his group The Zydeco Experience won the Grammy Award for Best Zydeco or Cajun Music Album in 2008 and for Best Regional Roots Music Album in 2014.

== Early life ==
Simien is an eighth generation Creole from one of the earliest Creole families documented to have settled in the Mallet area of St. Landry Parish. He was introduced to music via the piano at home, the Catholic Church choir, and in school band programs where he played trumpet.

While in his teens, he taught himself to play accordion and formed his first band Terrance Simien & The Mallet Playboys, and began to play the regional zydeco club and church hall circuit. In the early 1980s, Simien was a youth in his early 20s and one of only two (Sam Brothers was the other) emerging zydeco artists leading a band and performing their indigenous zydeco roots music. This was a pivotal time in zydeco music history since the pioneers of the genre were aging and the music was in jeopardy of dying off without the critical presence of emerging artists continuing the traditions. Upon being asked about his opinion of his debut album in a 1991 interview, Simien said: "I think we've done what we set out to do, and that is catch the energy of the live performance. Also give the audience something new that we couldn't do live. But we basically stayed true to what we were doing; we didn't try to make a hit song. We just put out what we've been doing for the past five years on the road, and it couldn't have come out any better than it did. There are some disappointments. You always wish you had more time, more money, more everything."

== Career ==
Simien and his group have toured internationally, presenting over 8500 live performances in more than 45 countries, and released dozens of solo recordings and collaborations. He has shared studio and stage with the likes of Paul Simon, Dr. John, The Meters, Marcia Ball, Dave Matthews, Stevie Wonder, Robert Palmer and the roots rockers Los Lobos.

Simien has appeared on screen and contributed to the soundtracks of multiple movies, television films and commercials. He appears on the soundtrack of Disney Animation's 2009 film, The Princess and the Frog set in the French Quarter of New Orleans, featuring authentic Louisiana music scored by Randy Newman. He has also contributed to the soundtracks of movies, such as, The Big Easy, Exit to Eden and A Murder of Crows.

Simien and his business partner/wife, Cynthia, are active in Creole music education and advocacy. They created the "Creole for Kidz & The History of Zydeco" performing arts program, which provides informational performances to K-12 students, teachers and parents. Since it was created in 2001, Creole for Kidz has reached nearly 500,000 students, parents and teachers in more than 20 states, Mali, Dominican Republic, Brazil, Paraguay, Canada and Australia. The Simiens understand the importance of mentoring emerging artists and created MusicMatters, Inc., a non-profit for education and advocacy.

== Awards ==
In 2007, the Simiens helped establish a new Grammy voting category, Grammy Award for Best Zydeco or Cajun Music Album. His group, Terrance Simien and the Zydeco Experience, were the first ensemble to win a Grammy in that same category, in 2008 for Live! Worldwide.

== Discography ==
- Zydeco On the Bayou (Restless Records, 1990)
- There's Room for Us All (Black Top Records, 1993)
- Jam The Jazzfest (Valley Media, Inc, 1998)
- Positively Beadhead (Tone Cool, 1999)
- The Tribute Sessions (AIM Records, 2004)
- Creole For Kidz (Beadhead Records, 2004)
- Across the Parish Line (AIM Records, 2006)
- Live! Worldwide (Aim Records, 2007)
- Dockside Sessions (2014)
