= Where There's Smoke There's Fire =

Studio album by Buckwheat Zydeco
- Released: 1990
- Genre: Zydeco
- Label: Island
- Producer: David Hidalgo

Buckwheat Zydeco chronology
Taking It Home (1988)	Where There's Smoke There's Fire (1990)	On Track (1992)

Where There's Smoke There's Fire is an album by the American musician Buckwheat Zydeco, released in 1990. Zydeco and his band, Ils Sont Partis, supported the album with a North American tour. The album peaked at No. 140 on the Billboard 200.

== Production ==
The album was produced by David Hidalgo, who also played guitar. Dwight Yoakam duetted with Zydeco on the cover of Hank Williams's "Hey, Good Lookin'". "Beast of Burden" is a cover of the Rolling Stones song. Putting aside his accordion, Zydeco played a Hammond B-3 on "Maybe I Will". Steve Berlin played baritone sax on the album. Hidalgo duetted on the cover of Bobby Troup's "Route 66".

== Critical reception ==
Professional ratings
Review scores
Source	Rating
AllMusic	4.5/5 stars
Calgary Herald	B
Chicago Tribune	2.5/4 stars
The Encyclopedia of Popular Music	4/5 stars
Entertainment Weekly	B+
The Grove Press Guide to the Blues on CD	4/5 stars
MusicHound Folk: The Essential Album Guide	3/5 stars
Orlando Sentinel	5/5 stars
The Penguin Guide to Blues Recordings	2/4 stars
The Rolling Stone Album Guide	4/5 stars

The Toronto Star praised the "scalding, inventive tracks like Dural's own 'We're Having a Party', an experimental groove that levitates zydeco into the land of George Clinton psychofunk, replete with Hidalgo's sniping guitar, pop-bass and interplay of horns and accordion." The Calgary Herald opined that "Buckwheat doing his own material, particularly the instrumentals, could raise the dead and get them up dancing." The Gazette wrote that "Buckwheat chooses his cover songs with a beautifully blithe disregard for stylistic boundaries." The Chicago Tribune noted that "Hidalgo has had plenty of experience navigating those narrow straits where traditional sounds and contemporary styles can mingle smoothly and not create a roiling mess." The Orlando Sentinel deemed the title track "a rocking instrumental with a wonderful, bluesy guitar solo."

AllMusic concluded that "this is superior in many ways to the music of [Clifton] Chenier ... due to its generally happier mood and quicker, more emphasized beats and basslines." The Grove Press Guide to the Blues on CD called the album "fun, intelligent 'Creole blues.'"

== Track listing ==
No.	Title	Length
1.	"What You Gonna Do?"
2.	"Buck's Hot Rod"
3.	"Hey, Good Lookin'"
4.	"We're Having a Party"
5.	"Beast of Burden"
6.	"Be Good or Be Gone"
7.	"Maybe I Will"
8.	"Pour Tout Quelque'un"
9.	"Where There's Smoke There's Fire"
10.	"Route 66"
11.	"It's Getting Late"
