= Varise Conner =

American musician

- Varise Conner on the cover of "Louisiana Folk Masters - Varise Conner"

Background information
- Born: 1906
- Origin: Lake Arthur, Louisiana
- Died: 1994 (aged 87–88)
- Genres: Cajun
- Instrument: Fiddle
- Formerly of: Conner Boys

Varise Conner (October 21, 1906 – June 19, 1994) was a Cajun fiddler born in Lake Arthur, Louisiana. His works and personality has inspired many prominent Cajun musicians.

== History ==
He was the son of Arsen and Emma Granger Conner. He was a third generation fiddler: his grandfather, Octave Conner, was also a fiddler. His ancestry can be traced to Ireland, when William Conner immigrated to Louisiana in the mid 18th century and to the French Acadians who arrived in Louisiana in the 1750s from what is now Nova Scotia. He started to play the fiddle at the age of 9. His father bought him a copy of a 1713 Stradivarius violin. He then started to play with his brothers Murphy and Valsin. Soon after forming a family string band known as The Conner Boys, they were playing local dance halls. Conner is known for the Lake Arthur Stomp, which was originally called the Lake Arthur Two-Step. It was renamed, because so many people would stomp their feet. In 1935, Conner quit playing in the dance halls for a share in the gate proceeds. Because of the Depression, few could pay to go into the dance halls and he wouldn't play for free. At the insistence of his daughter, Ethyl, who purchased a new bow for him, Conner resumed playing fiddle in 1956. Soon, he was playing at local festivals and concerts although he most often played at his home or at the homes of friends and fellow musicians.

== Legacy ==
Conner has inspired artists such as Michael Doucet and Ken Smith. He was noted for his smooth and light tone on the violin. Dewey Balfa admired his smooth bowing and his ability to play the higher register. Conner has been featured at the Tribute to Cajun Music Festival in Lafayette. Also, a series of recordings from University of Louisiana at Lafayette has been released on Louisiana Crossroad Records.

== See also ==
- List of Notable People Related to Cajun Music
