= Lay Your Burden Down =

Studio album by Buckwheat Zydeco
- Released: May 5, 2009
- Genre: Zydeco
- Length: 47:01
- Label: Alligator
- Producer: Steve Berlin

Buckwheat Zydeco chronology
The Best of Buckwheat Zydeco: Millennium Collection (2009)	Lay Your Burden Down (2009)	Let The Good Times Roll: Essential Recordings (2006)

Lay Your Burden Down is a studio album by Buckwheat Zydeco, released in 2009 through Alligator Records. The album ranked number five on Billboards Top Blues Albums. In 2010, the album earned Buckwheat Zydeco the Grammy Award for Best Zydeco or Cajun Music Album. This is Buckwheat Zydeco's first record with Alligator Records and was produced by Steve Berlin, who produced his 1994 album Five Card Stud.

== Track listing ==
No.	Title	Composer	Length
1.	"When the Levee Breaks"	Kansas Joe McCoy, Memphis Minnie	5:15
2.	"The Wrong Side"	JJ Grey	4:28
3.	"Let Your Yeah Be Yeah"	James B. Chambers	3:37
4.	"Don't Leave Me"	Buckwheat Zydeco, Ted Fox	4:46
5.	"Back in Your Arms"	Bruce Springsteen	4:29
6.	"Throw Me Something, Mister"	Buckwheat Zydeco	3:57
7.	"Lay Your Burden Down"	Warren Haynes, Michael Barbiero	5:22
8.	"Time Goes By"	Buckwheat Zydeco, Ted Fox	4:05
9.	"Ninth Place"	Buckwheat Zydeco, Ted Fox	3:23
10.	"Too Much Time"	Don Van Vliet	2:59
11.	"Finding My Way Back Home"	Buckwheat Zydeco	4:40
Total length:			47:01

== Personnel ==
The album features the Buckwheat Zydeco and The Ils Sont Partis Band, usually shortened to just Buckwheat Zydeco. In the album, this band included:

- Stanley "Buckwheat" Dural Jr. on accordion, Hammond B3 organ, synth keyboard, lead vocals & backing vocals;
- Sir Reginald Master Dural on rubboard, backing vocals;
- Michael Melchione on guitar;
- Olivier Scoazec on guitar;
- Curtis Watson on trumpet;
- Lee Allen Zeno on bass guitar, backing vocals;
- Kevin Menard on drums.

Also, helped create the album:

- Steve Berlin – baritone saxophone
- Troy "Trombone Shorty" Andrews – trombone
- John "J.J." Grey – backing vocal & Wurlitzer electric piano (on track 2)
- Sonny Landreth – slide guitar (on tracks 1, 2)
- Warren Haynes – slide guitar (on track 7)
- David Farrell – engineer/mixer
- Korey Richey - second engineer
