= Pretty Runs Out =

Studio album by Amanda Shaw
- Released: January 8, 2008
- Genre: Pop
- Label: Rounder Records
- Producer: Scott Billington

Amanda Shaw chronology
I'm Not A Bubble Gum Pop Princess (2004)	Pretty Runs Out (2008)

Pretty Runs Out is the third album from New Orleans singer and fiddler Amanda Shaw. It is the first album Shaw has recorded after being signed to the major label Rounder Records.

== Track listing ==
1. "Pretty Runs Out" (3:29)
2. "Chirmolito" (3:11)
3. "French Jig" (3:14)
4. "Brick Wall" (3:50)
5. "I Don't Want to Be Your Friend" (4:17)
6. "Garden of Eden" (4:15)
7. "What's Wrong With You?" (4:24)
8. "McGee's Medley" (4:10)
9. "Wishing Me Away" (4:18)
10. "Gone" (3:11)
11. "Woulda Coulda Shoulda" (3:24)
12. "Reels: The Gaspé Reel/Sam's Slammer/Imogen's Ridge" (4:21)
13. "Easy On Your Way Out"

== Reception ==
Professional ratings
Review scores
Source	Rating
AllMusic	4/5 stars

Rick Anderson of AllMusic praised Pretty Runs Out for having a wide breadth of musical genres while keeping a hometown grown sound. Alternatively, reviewers compared Shaw's performance on Pretty Runs Out to other country singers. Chuck Eddy of Billboard believed Shaw's vocals were akin to Rachel Sweet while The Bluegrass Special magazine felt that Shaw's combination of songwriting, singing, and performing was following the same steps as Chris Thile.
