= Boogie Woogie Zydeco =

Studio album by Chubby Carrier and the Bayou Swamp Band
- Released: 1991
- Genre: Zydeco
- Label: Flying Fish

Chubby Carrier and the Bayou Swamp Band chronology
Go Zydeco Go (1989)	Boogie Woogie Zydeco (1991)	Dance All Night (1993)

Boogie Woogie Zydeco is an album by the American band Chubby Carrier and the Bayou Swamp Band, released in 1991. The album was part of the zydeco revival of the late 1980s and early 1990s, and was noted for its especially fast tempos and rock elements.

== Production ==
The album was recorded in Evanston, Illinois. The band wrote 12 of the album's 15 songs. "Good for the Goose" is a cover of the Rockin' Sidney song; "Dog Hill" is a cover of the Boozoo Chavis song, while ""Madelaine" is a traditional song. The two washboards heard on the album were played by Carrier's brother and cousin. Rodney Dural, Buckwheat Zydeco's nephew, played bass on Boogie Woogie Zydeco; David LeJeune played guitar.

== Critical reception ==
Professional ratings
Review scores
Source	Rating
AllMusic	5/5 stars
Boston Herald	B+
Chicago Tribune	3/4 stars
MusicHound World: The Essential Album Guide	3/5 stars
Orlando Sentinel	2/5 stars
The Penguin Guide to Blues Recordings	2.5/4 stars

The Washington Post wrote that "Carrier's singing is nothing to write home about either, but at least it's more engaging than the tedious blues-rock guitar solos that punctuate the album with dulling frequency." The Orlando Sentinel determined that "Carrier isn't a Cajun purist, but he's a third-generation accordionist... The traditional element is prominent in both his spritely playing and the band's washboard-driven polyrhythms."

The Edmonton Journal stated that "Carrier mixes various shades of dance music with a couple of washboards, bass and percussion keeping up the pace." The Telegram & Gazette noted the addition of "hot Southern-rock guitar licks." The Commercial Appeal concluded that Boogie Woogie Zydeco showcases Carrier's "fine accordion playing, tight band and strongly traditional approach to zydeco's Cajun-Creole-R&B fusion."

AllMusic wrote that "Carrier slows down the tempo for the 1960s-type soul numbers 'Be Fair to the People' and 'Sherrie', both of which are so appealing that they make one wish he embraced slower tempos more often." The Penguin Guide to Blues Recordings praised the "exceptionally crisp, articulate and well-recorded percussion."

== Track listing ==
No.	Title	Length
1.	"Boogie Woogie Zydeco"
2.	"Madelaine"
3.	"Good for the Goose"
4.	"Allons Dancez"
5.	"Creole Two Step"
6.	"Sherrie"
7.	"Bernadette"
8.	"Mama"
9.	"Young Creole Man"
10.	"Josephine"
11.	"Hey Babariba"
12.	"Be Fair to the People"
13.	"Steppin' Out Zydeco"
14.	"Oh My My"
15.	"Dog Hill"
