= BeauSoleil =

Cajun band

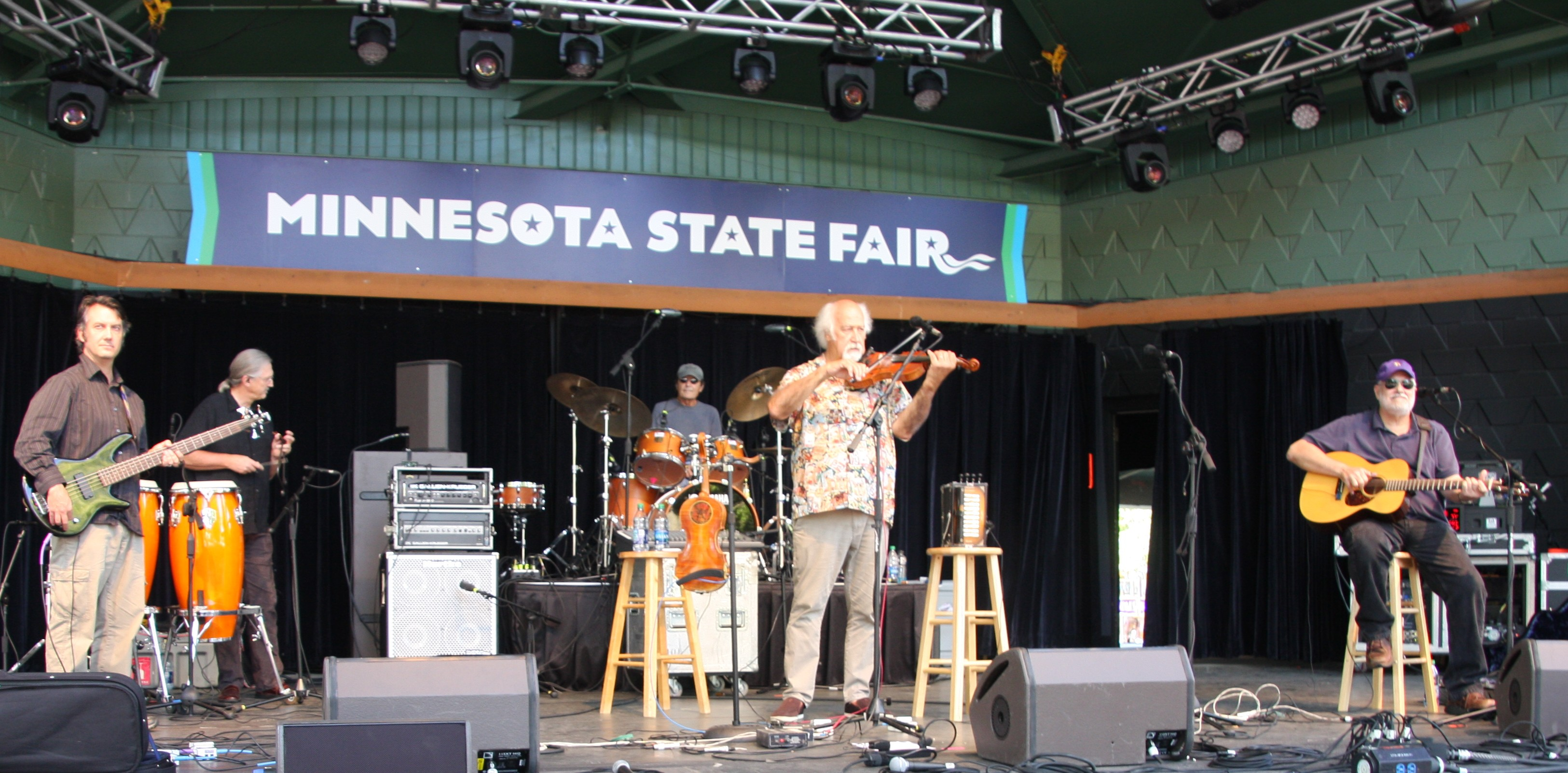
- BeauSoleil at the Minnesota State Fair, 2016

Background information
- Also known as: BeauSoleil avec Michael Doucet (1975)
- Origin: Lafayette, Louisiana, U.S.
- Genres: Cajun, zydeco, folk
- Years active: 1975–present
- Labels: Swallow, Arhoolie, Rounder, Rhino, Vanguard, Yep Roc, Compass
- Members: Michael Doucet; David Doucet; Mitchell Reed; Chad Huval; Bill Bennett
- Past members: Billy Ware Tommy Alesi Matthew Doucet: Jimmy Breaux; Errol Verret; Tommy Comeaux; Al Tharp; Bessyl Duhon; Robert Vignaud
- Website: beausoleilmusic.com

BeauSoleil (French, beautiful sun) (formerly known as BeauSoleil avec Michael Doucet) is a Cajun band from Louisiana, United States.

== Band history ==
Founded in 1975, BeauSoleil (often billed as "BeauSoleil avec Michael Doucet") released its first album in 1977 and became one of the most well-known bands performing traditional and original music rooted in the folk tunes of the Cajuns and Creoles of Louisiana. In early years they appeared at CODOFIL's annual "Tribute to Cajun Music" in Lafayette, Louisiana. They were part of the Smithsonian Folklife Festival in 1983.

BeauSoleil tours extensively in the U.S. and internationally. While its repertoire includes hundreds of traditional Cajun, Creole and zydeco songs, BeauSoleil has also pushed past constraints of purely traditional instrumentation, rhythm, and lyrics of Louisiana folk music, incorporating elements of rock and roll, jazz, blues, calypso, and other genres in original compositions and reworkings of traditional tunes. Lyrics on BeauSoleil recordings are sung in English or Cajun French (and sometimes both in one song).

According to the band's website, BeauSoleil's musicians "take the rich Cajun traditions of Louisiana and artfully blend elements of zydeco, New Orleans jazz, Tex-Mex, country, blues and more into a satisfying musical recipe." The band's name is a tribute to Joseph Broussard dit Beausoleil, an Acadian resistance leader who led many Acadians to Louisiana following their expulsion by the British.

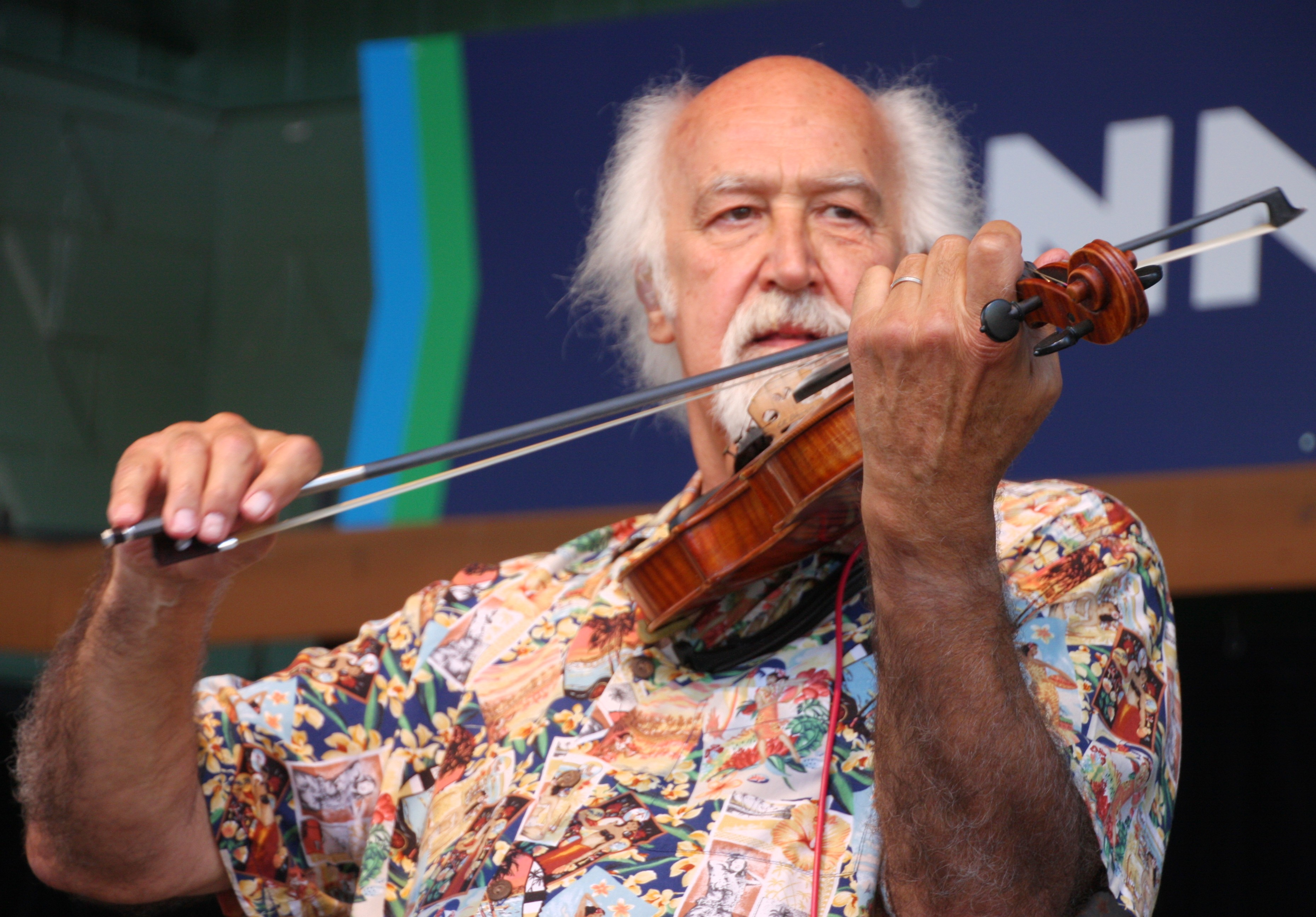
Michael Doucet playing fiddle

BeauSoleil has appeared on soundtracks to films The Big Easy, Passion Fish and Belizaire the Cajun. The group plays at jazz and folk festivals and has appeared on numerous television shows, including CNN's Showbiz Today, Austin City Limits, Late Night with Conan O'Brien, and Emeril Live. BeauSoleil appeared regularly on Garrison Keillor's Prairie Home Companion radio show. Keillor has hailed the group as the "best Cajun band in the world". BeauSoleil has also performed in concert with Mary Chapin Carpenter and opened for the Grateful Dead. Carpenter featured them on her 1991 single "Down at the Twist and Shout", in which they are also mentioned by name.

== Awards and honors ==
BeauSoleil is one of a few groups performing traditional Louisiana music to win a Grammy Award. L'Amour Ou La Folie (Love Or Folly), recorded in 1996 and released on Rhino Records, earned the 1997 Grammy for Best Traditional Folk Album. In a review on Amazon.com, Richard Gehr wrote, "By now the sextet transcends the dancehall, possessing the ability to transform nearly any traditional Cajun, Creole, or French tune into high art while preserving a clear sonic bloodline back to its roots."

In 2005, BeauSoleil's Gitane Cajun, released on Vanguard Records, earned the group its tenth Grammy nomination for Best Traditional Folk Album. A reflection of its versatility is that BeauSoleil has also earned a Grammy nomination in the Contemporary Folk category, for the 1999 album Cajunization, with songs that effortlessly span Cajun, calypso, French ballad, blues and other musical styles.

In 2005, BeauSoleil won the Big Easy Entertainment Award for Best Cajun Band, the tenth time the band was honored in the 18-year history of the awards presented by the New Orleans music and entertainment publication Gambit Weekly.

In 2005, BeauSoleil founder Michael Doucet was one of 12 artists awarded a National Heritage Fellowship by the National Endowment for the Arts.

In 2008, BeauSoleil won their second Grammy in the then-newly created Grammy Award for Best Zydeco or Cajun Music Album category for the album Live at the 2008 New Orleans Jazz & Heritage Festival.

BeauSoleil was inducted into the Louisiana Music Hall of Fame in 2011.

The BeauSoleil Quartet was interviewed by Stephen Winick of the American Folklife Center to preserve their oral history on June 28, 2017.

As of 2025, the group has won two Grammy Awards, with an additional 11 nominations.

== Discography ==
=== Albums ===
- 1976 La Nuit (Released only in France)
- 1977 The Spirit of Cajun Music (Swallow)
- 1984 Michael Doucet with BeauSoleil (Arhoolie)
- 1984 Parlez-Nous a Boire (Arhoolie)
- 1986 Allons a Lafayette (Arhoolie) with Canray Fontenot
- 1986 Belizaire the Cajun (soundtrack) (Arhoolie)
- 1987 Bayou Boogie (Rounder)
- 1988 Hot Chili Mama (Arhoolie)
- 1989 Bayou Cadillac (Rounder)
- 1989 Zydeco Gris Gris (Swallow)
- 1989 Live from the Left Coast (Rounder)
- 1991 Cajun Conja (Rhino)
- 1991 Déjá Vu (Swallow)
- 1993 La Danse de la Vie (Forward)
- 1994 Cajun & Creole Music (Music of the World)
- 1994 L' Echo (Rhino/Forward)
- 1995 Vintage Beausoleil (Music of the World)
- 1997 L' Amour Ou la Folie (Rhino)
- 1997 Arc de Triomphe Two-Step (Hemisphere) - recording of 1976
- 2001 Looking Back Tomorrow: Beausoleil Live! (Rhino)
- 2004 Gitane Cajun (Vanguard)
- 2006 Live in Louisiana (Way Down in Louisiana)
- 2008 Live at the 2008 New Orleans Jazz & Heritage Festival BeauSoleil & Michael Doucet (MunckMix)
- 2009 Alligator Purse (Yep Roc)
- 2013 From Bamako to Carencro (Compass)
- 2020 Evangeline Waltz (Sunset Blvd)

=== Compilation albums ===
- 1997 The Best of BeauSoleil (Arhoolie)
- 1999 Cajunization (Rhino)
- 2001 Best of Crawfish Years 1985 - 1991 (Rounder)
- 2003 Their Swallow Years (Ace)
- 2003 Encore, Encore!! The Best of BeauSoleil 1991 - 2001 (Rhino)

== See also ==
- History of Cajun music
- List of people related to Cajun music
