= Positively Beadhead =

Studio album by Terrance Simien
- Released: 1999
- Genre: Zydeco
- Label: Tone-Cool
- Producer: Terrance Simien

Terrance Simien chronology
Jam the Jazzfest (1998)	Positively Beadhead (1999)	The Tribute Sessions (2004)

Positively Beadhead is an album by the American musician Terrance Simien, released in 1999. Simien supported the album with a North American tour. The album title refers to Simien's practice of throwing beads to his fans during concerts.

== Production ==
Simien was backed by his band, the Mallet Playboys. "Keep On Smilin'" is a cover of the Wet Willie song. "500 Miles" is a version of the folk standard written by Hedy West. "Jolie Blonde" is an interpretation of the Cajun song. "Macque Choux" is named after the Creole corn recipe. "Mardi Gras in the Country" employs congas and timbales in the song's break. "Grandma's House" imagines various dead musicians in heaven. Paul Cebar contributed to the songwriting.

== Critical reception ==
Professional ratings
Review scores
Source	Rating
AllMusic	4/5 stars
Associated Press	3/4 stars
The Gazette	7/10
The Penguin Guide to Blues Recordings	2/4 stars

The Gazette noted that "some bands aim for back-to-the-bayou authenticity, but Simien has a fondness for uptown soulfulness." OffBeat wrote that Simien "sings in a silky, creamy high-end voice that's gorgeously soulful, exhibiting a sheen like no other." The Chicago Tribune determined that, "closer to Cajun-flavored pop than genuine folk, Simien's eclectic brand of bayou elevates melody over feverish dance grooves, but what it lacks in old school energy it more than makes up for in fetching, accordion-accented hooks."

The News Journal said that "Simien's ever-curious take on the afterlife shares equal space with Zydeco rave-ups and Caribbean-flavored steel drums." The Boston Globe concluded that "Simien is finally on his way to living up to his potential." The Star Tribune opined that "all the zydeco, soul music, yuppie pop and hippie rock pay off wonderfully."

AllMusic deemed Positively Beadhead "an album that has a lot more going for it than just another garden-variety zydeco party disc."

== Track listing ==
No.	Title	Length
1.	"All Her Lovin"
2.	"Paradise"
3.	"Mardi Gras in the Country"
4.	"This Old Road"
5.	"Grandma's House"
6.	"500 Miles"
7.	"La Neuville Danse"
8.	"Jolie Blonde"
9.	"Same Dog"
10.	"Macque Choux"
11.	"Keep On Smilin'"
12.	"Shake Your Tambourine"
