= One for the Road (Buckwheat Zydeco album) =

Studio album by Buckwheat Zydeco
- Released: 1979
- Label: Blues Unlimited
- Producer: Mark Miller

Buckwheat Zydeco chronology
One for the Road (1979)	Take It Easy, Baby (1980)

One for the Road is Buckwheat Zydeco's debut album, credited to his band at the time, Buckwheat Zydeco Ils Sont Partis Band. Ils Sont Partis is French for 'They're Off!', used by horse race announcers at the start of a race. It was released on J.D. Miller's Blues Unlimited label in 1979. The majority of the tracks were written by Buckwheat Zydeco, credited to his birth name, Stanley Dural. He reworked Fats Domino's "Good Hearted Man" renaming it "You Got Me Walkin' the Floor" and Clifton Chenier's "Oh My, Lucille" as simply "Lucille". B. B. King's "Rock Me Baby" was also covered. The track "I Bought Me a Raccoon" was his first local hit and was inspired by his pet racoon, Jack (later replaced by Tina), who he brought on the road and draped over his shoulders while playing.

== Critical reception ==
Alan Greenberg for AllMusic contrasted One for the Road to Zydeco's later work as more blues-based, slower and more bass-heavy, and overall more relaxed. Michael Tisserand, in his book The Kingdom of Zydeco describes the album as a "mixture of two-step, waltzes, and the blues."

== Track listing ==
All tracks are written by Buckwheat Zydeco, as Stanley Dural, unless otherwise noted.

No.	Title	Writer(s)	Length
1.	"I Bought Me a Raccoon"		3:28
2.	"Zydeco Honky Tonk"		2:42
3.	"Madame Coco Bo"		3:09
4.	"Rock Me Baby"	B. B. King, Joe Josea	4:03
5.	"Please Little Girl (Let Me In)"		2:26
6.	"Zydeco Rock"		2:27
7.	"Bim Bam, Thank You Mam"		3:15
8.	"You Got Me Walkin' the Floor"	Fats Domino, Dave Bartholomew	4:23
9.	"Zydeco Boogie Woogie"		2:02
10.	"One for the Road"		3:29
11.	"Lucille"	Clifton Chenier	3:25
12.	"Buckwheat Music"		2:25

== Personnel ==
- Buckwheat Zydeco – vocals (French and English), accordion, piano, and organ
- Ted Zerby – bass
- Jimmy Papillion – drums
- Russell Gordon – guitar
- John Bell – saxophone
- Elijah Cudges – washboard

== Releases ==
Date	Label	Format
1979	Blues Unlimited	LP
1991	Paula Records	CD
