= Who Stole the Hot Sauce? =

Studio album by Chubby Carrier and the Bayou Swamp Band
- Released: 1996
- Genre: Zydeco
- Label: Blind Pig
- Producer: Michael Freeman

Chubby Carrier and the Bayou Swamp Band chronology
Dance All Night (1993)	Who Stole the Hot Sauce? (1996)	Too Hot to Handle (1998)

Who Stole the Hot Sauce? is an album by the American band Chubby Carrier and the Bayou Swamp Band, released in 1996. The band supported the album with a North American tour that included several festival appearances. The album was a success on blues radio stations. The title track became one of Carrier's most popular songs.

== Production ==
The album was produced by Michael Freeman. Carrier chose to update the traditional zydeco sound by slowing it down and adding guitar solos and a more pronounced rhythmic presence. "The Cisco Kid" is a cover of the song by War; Billy Branch contributed a harmonica solo. "Squeeze Box" is a version of the Who song. "Zydeco Sont Pas Sale" was written by Clifton Chenier. "Ya Ya" is a cover of the song made famous by Lee Dorsey.

== Critical reception ==
Professional ratings
Review scores
Source	Rating
AllMusic	4.5/5 stars
The Buffalo News	4/5 stars
MusicHound Folk: The Essential Album Guide	3.5/5 stars
The Penguin Guide to Blues Recordings	2.5/4 stars

Noting the two styles of zydeco, double-clutching and song-oriented, The Washington Post wrote that Carrier "has found a way to combine the two by savoring the melodies fully in his rich, soulful tenor even as he emphasizes the repeating vamps with his bleating accordion, reinforced by his superb, interracial Bayou Swamp Band." The Chicago Tribune determined that the cover songs underline "Carrier's zyde-pop inclinations." The Buffalo News said that "Ronnie Boudreaux is a special treat on lead guitar." The Red Deer Advocate concluded that the band has "scooped this gumbo of blues, Cajun, gospel, soul, [and] New Orleans funk into their own dynamite, distinctive sound."

== Track listing ==
No.	Title	Length
1.	"Who Stole the Hot Sauce?"
2.	"Luziana Feelin'"
3.	"The Cisco Kid"
4.	"Zydeco Keeps You Young"
5.	"Hard to Believe"
6.	"Zydeco Sont Pas Sale"
7.	"Creole Partner"
8.	"Wasting Time"
9.	"Ya Ya"
10.	"Squeeze Box"
11.	"Rockin' in the Cradle of the South"
