= Five Card Stud (album) =

Studio album by Buckwheat Zydeco
- Released: 1994
- Genre: Zydeco
- Label: Island
- Producer: Steve Berlin

Buckwheat Zydeco chronology
Choo Choo Boogaloo (1994)	Five Card Stud (1994)	The Best of Louisiana Zydeco (1996)

Five Card Stud is an album by the American musician Buckwheat Zydeco, released in 1994. It peaked at No. 14 on Billboard's World Albums chart. Zydeco supported the album with a North American tour. Five Card Stud was released around the same time as Zydeco's children's album, Choo Choo Boogaloo.

== Production ==
The album was produced by Steve Berlin; his Los Lobos bandmate David Hidalgo contributed to some of the tracks. Zydeco was interested in trying a variety of musical styles, in part to gain radio airplay. Mavis Staples sang on "This Train". Willie Nelson played guitar and sang on the version of his song "Man with the Blues". "Bayou Girl" was written by Van Morrison, who had recorded but not released his version. "Hey Baby" is a cover of the Bruce Channel hit.

== Critical reception ==
Professional ratings
Review scores
Source	Rating
AllMusic	3/5 stars
The Encyclopedia of Popular Music	3/5 stars
The Indianapolis Star	2/4 stars
Orlando Sentinel	4/5 stars

The Edmonton Journal wrote that "Dural leads an eight-piece group, and calls on his punchy three-piece horn section to fill out the arrangements with pizzazz." The Indianapolis Star opined that "it lacks the ambiance, energy, soul or whatever quality that drives these rhythms." The Orlando Sentinel praised the "loose, live feel... You can hear the wood of the drums, the brass of the horns and the cheap metal of the spoon raking across the rubboard."

Stereo Review noted that, "without the guests on hand to supply most of the Tabasco, Five Card Stud would be a strictly back-bayou offering." The Chicago Tribune said that Zydeco "especially shines when he leaves the bayou for the horn-blasting, James Brown-esque title cut." The Times Colonist called the album "soupy, swampy funk with whiplash horn arrangements by Buckwheat and a lived-in production."

== Track listing ==
No.	Title	Length
1.	"Hey Baby"
2.	"Make It Easy on Yourself"
3.	"Man with the Blues"
4.	"I.R.S."
5.	"This Train"
6.	"Trust Me"
7.	"Five Card Stud"
8.	"Baby Doll"
9.	"Bayou Girl"
10.	"Secret of Love"
