= Buckwheat Zydeco =

American accordionist (1947–2016)

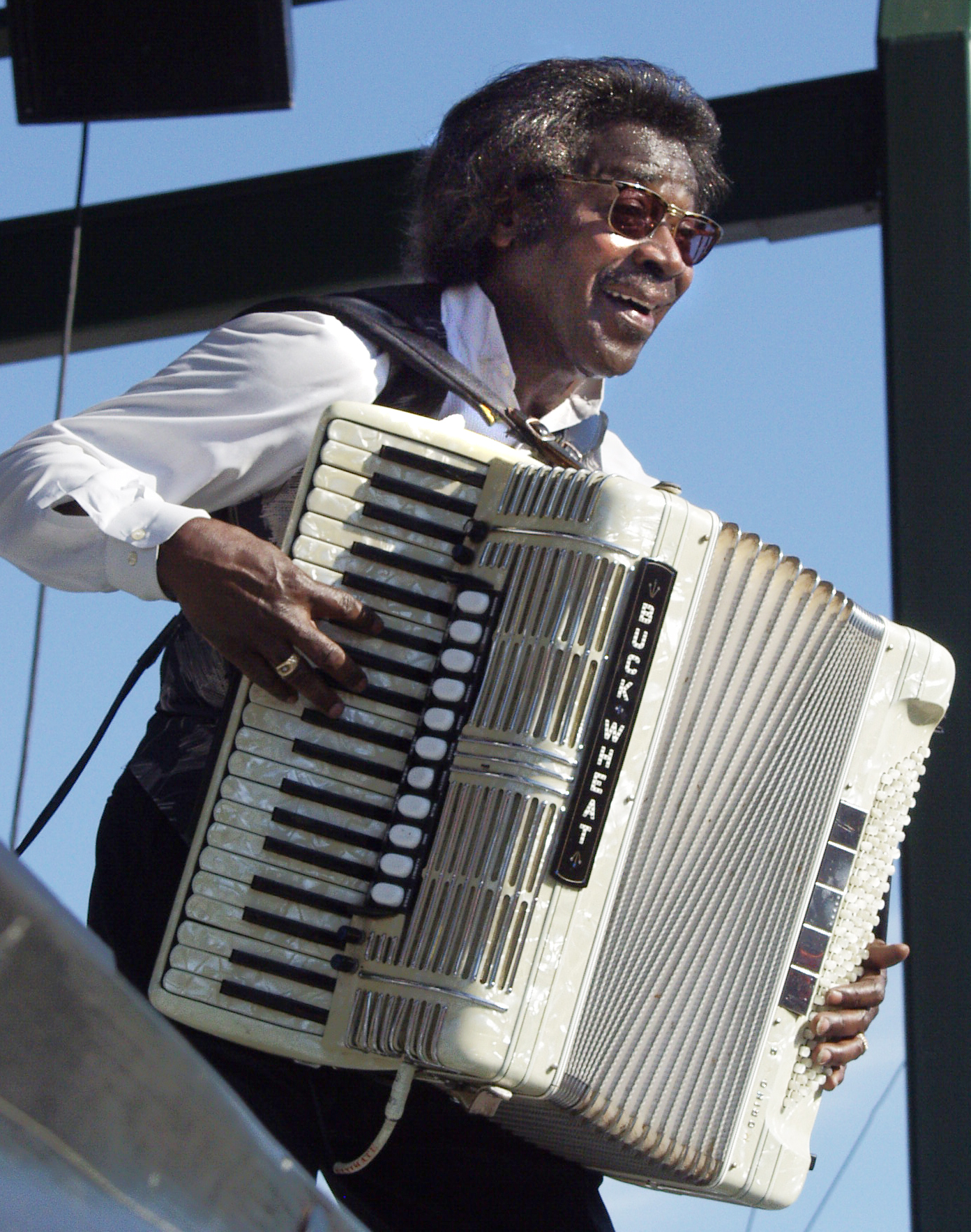
- Buckwheat Zydeco playing on the main stage at the 2006 Festival International de Louisiane

Background information
- Also known as: Buckwheat Zydeco
- Born: Stanley Dural Jr. November 14, 1947; Lafayette, Louisiana, U.S.
- Died: September 24, 2016 (aged 68) Lafayette, Louisiana, U.S.
- Genres: Zydeco; R&B
- Instruments: Vocals, accordion
- Years active: 1971–2016
- Labels: Alligator; Tomorrow Recordings; Rounder; Island/PolyGram; Charisma/Virgin/EMI
- Website: www.buckwheatzydeco.com

Buckwheat Zydeco (born Stanley Dural Jr.; November 14, 1947 – September 24, 2016) was an American accordionist and zydeco musician. He was one of the few zydeco artists to achieve mainstream success. His music group was formally billed as Buckwheat Zydeco and Ils Sont Partis Band ("Ils Sont Partis" being French for "They have left," or a race announcer's "And they're off!"), but they often performed as merely Buckwheat Zydeco.

The New York Times said: "Stanley 'Buckwheat' Dural leads one of the best bands in America. A down-home and high-powered celebration, meaty and muscular with a fine-tuned sense of dynamics…propulsive rhythms, incendiary performances." USA Today called him "a zydeco trailblazer." Buckwheat Zydeco performed with famous musicians such as Eric Clapton (with whom he also recorded), U2 and the Boston Pops. The band performed at the closing ceremonies of the 1996 Summer Olympics to a worldwide audience of three billion people. Buckwheat performed for President Clinton twice, celebrating both of his inaugurations. The band appeared on the Late Show with David Letterman, CNN, The Today Show, MTV, NBC News, CBS Morning News, National Public Radio's Mountain Stage, and Late Night with Jimmy Fallon.

== Early life ==
Dural was born in Lafayette, Louisiana. He was one of 13 children; he had six brothers and six sisters. As a five-year-old boy, he worked on a farm picking cotton. He also worked as a delivery boy and cared for chickens. He acquired his nickname as a youth, because, with his braided hair, he looked like the character Buckwheat from Our Gang/The Little Rascals movies. His father, a farmer, was an accomplished amateur traditional Creole accordion player, but young Dural preferred listening to and playing rhythm and blues.

== Career ==
Dural became proficient at the organ, and by the late 1950s he was backing Joe Tex, Clarence "Gatemouth" Brown and many others. As a teenager, he played piano for Little Richard, Fats Domino, and Ray Charles. Two Lafayette-based bands that he played in during his teens and twenties were Sammy and the Untouchables and Lil' Buck and the Top Cats.

In 1971, he founded Buckwheat & the Hitchhikers, a funk band that he led for five years before switching to zydeco. They were a local sensation and found success with the single, "It's Hard To Get", recorded for a local Louisiana-based label.

He began backing Clifton Chenier, one of the most legendary zydeco performers. Though not a traditional zydeco fan when growing up, Buckwheat accepted an invitation in 1976 to join Clifton Chenier's Red Hot Louisiana Band as organist. He quickly discovered the popularity of zydeco music, and noted the effect the music had on the audience. "Everywhere, people young and old just loved zydeco music," Dural says. "I had so much fun playing that first night with Clifton. We played for four hours and I wasn't ready to quit."

Dural's relationship with Chenier led him to take up the accordion in 1978. After practicing for a year, he felt ready to start his own band under the name Buckwheat Zydeco. They debuted with One for the Road in 1979 on the Blues Unlimited label and then recorded for New Orleans' Black Top label. In 1983, they were nominated for a Grammy Award for Turning Point and in 1985 for Waitin' For My Ya Ya after switching to the Rounder Records label. Scott Billington of Rounder wrote that Buckwheat "played the large piano accordion, like Clifton, but delivered his music with the flair of a rhythm and blues star like Joe Tex, and with the precision of James Brown. He performed Creole dance music, but it was also Southern soul music and Louisiana funk, with a Caribbean edge, all in one package."

The band then signed to Island Records, becoming the first zydeco act on a major label, and released On a Night Like This, a critically acclaimed album that was nominated for a Grammy as well.

In 1988, Eric Clapton invited the band to open his North American tour as well as his 12-night stand at London’s Royal Albert Hall. Buckwheat subsequently shared stages and/or recording with Keith Richards, Robert Plant, Willie Nelson, Mavis Staples, David Hidalgo, Dwight Yoakam, Paul Simon, Ry Cooder, the Cherry Poppin' Daddies and many others, including indie music band Yo La Tengo on the soundtrack of the Bob Dylan bio-pic, I'm Not There. His music has been featured in films including The Waterboy, The Big Easy, Fletch Lives and Hard Target. BET's show Comic View used his live version of “What You Gonna Do?” as theme music for the program's 10th anniversary "Pardi Gras" season. He also wrote and performed the theme music for the PBS television series Pierre Franey's Cooking In America. Buckwheat won an Emmy for his music in the CBS TV movie, Pistol Pete: The Life and Times of Pete Maravich.

Buckwheat Zydeco played many major music festivals, including the New Orleans Jazz & Heritage Festival (numerous times), Chicago Blues Festival, Newport Folk Festival, Summerfest, San Diego Street Scene, Bumbershoot, Montreux Jazz Festival, the Voodoo Experience, and countless others.

During the 1990s and early 2000s Buckwheat recorded for his own Tomorrow Recordings label and maintained an extensive touring schedule. Buckwheat Zydeco's last album, Lay Your Burden Down, was released on May 5, 2009, on the Alligator Records label. It was produced by Steve Berlin of Los Lobos and included guest appearances by guitarists Warren Haynes and Sonny Landreth, Trombone Shorty, JJ Grey and Berlin himself. The album was nominated for a Grammy Award. Sonicboomers.com says, "The CD is a vastly entertaining and appealingly diverse package. Bandleader Dural remains an ever-engaging vocalist and a whiz on any keyboard he touches. So, for Buckwheat Zydeco fans, Lay Your Burden Down finds the maestro and his group near the top of their form. For listeners with less interest in the ol' accordion get-down, the collection supplies enough interesting wrinkles to get the good times rolling."

Buckwheat Zydeco's version of the classic "Cryin' in the Streets" appears on the benefit album for Hurricane Katrina recovery, Our New Orleans: A Benefit Album for the Gulf Coast. His version of Memphis Minnie and Kansas Joe McCoy's "When the Levee Breaks" appeared on 2011's Alligator Records 40th Anniversary Collection. It originally appeared on the 2009 Buckwheat Zydeco album Lay Your Burden Down.

== Death ==
Dural died of lung cancer at age 68 on September 24, 2016, at Our Lady of Lourdes Regional Medical Center. His funeral was held at Immaculate Conception Catholic Church in Lafayette.

== Discography ==
- 2010 Bayou Boogie (Music for Little People)
- 2009 Let the Good Times Roll: Essential Recordings (Rounder Records)
- 2009 Lay Your Burden Down (Alligator Records)
- 2006 The Best of Buckwheat Zydeco: 20th Century Masters - The Millennium Collection (Island Records/UMe)
- 2005 Jackpot! (Tomorrow Recordings)
- 2003 Classics (Rounder Records)
- 2001 Down Home Live (Tomorrow Recordings)
- 2000 The Ultimate Collection (Hip-O Records)
- 1999 Buckwheat Zydeco Story: A 20 Year Party (Tomorrow Recordings)
- 1997 Trouble (Tomorrow Recordings)
- 1996 The Best of Louisiana Zydeco (AVI Entertainment)
- 1994 Five Card Stud (Island Records)
- 1994 Choo Choo Boogaloo (Music For Little People)
- 1993 Menagerie: The Essential Zydeco Collection (Mango Records)
- 1992 Buckwheat's Zydeco Party (Rounder Records)
- 1992 On Track (Atlantic Records)
- 1990 Where There's Smoke There's Fire (Island Records)
- 1988 Taking It Home (Island Records)
- 1987 On a Night Like This (Island Records; reissued on MCA Special Products)
- 1985 Waitin’ For My Ya Ya (Rounder Records)
- 1984 Ils Sont Partis (Blues Unlimited Records)
- 1983 Turning Point (Rounder Records)
- 1983 100% Fortified Zydeco (Black Top Records; reissued on Shout Factory Records)
- 1982 People's Choice (Blues Unlimited Records)
- 1980 Take It Easy, Baby (Blues Unlimited Records)
- 1979 One for the Road (Blues Unlimited Records; 1991 reissued on Paula Records)

== Music videos ==
Year	Video	Director
1990	"Hey Good Lookin'" (with Dwight Yoakam and David Hidalgo)	
2002	"New Orleans Is a Mighty Good Town" (with Eddy Raven)	Peter Lippman

== Awards and honors ==
=== Grammy Awards ===
Year	Category	Work nominated	Result	Ref.
1985	Best Ethnic or Traditional Folk Recording	100% Fortified Zydeco	Nominated	
1986	Best Ethnic or Traditional Folk Recording	Turning Point	Nominated	
1987	Best Traditional Folk Album	Waitin' for my Ya Ya	Nominated	
1988	Best Contemporary Blues Album	On a Night Like This	Nominated	
2010	Best Zydeco or Cajun Music Album	Lay Your Burden Down	Won	

=== OffBeat's Best of The Beat Awards ===
Year	Category	Result	Ref.
2001	Best Zydeco Band or Performer	Won	
2001	Best Accordionist	Won	
2002	Best Accordionist	Won	
2004	Best Accordionist	Won	
2010	Best Zydeco Band or Performer	Won	
