= Live! Worldwide =

Live album by Terrance Simien and the Zydeco Experience
- Released: September 4, 2007
- Genre: Cajun music
- Label: Aim Trading Group Pty, Ltd.

Live! Worldwide is a live album by Terrance Simien and the Zydeco Experience, released in 2007 through Aim Trading Group. The album earned Simien the Grammy Award for Best Zydeco or Cajun Music Album.

== Track listing ==
No.	Title	Composer	Length
1.	"Dance Everyday"	Simien, Williams	5:37
2.	"Zydeco Boogaloo"	Arceneaux	2:51
3.	"Uncle Bud"	Delafose	3:57
4.	"Mississippi"	Dylan	6:40
5.	"You Should Know Your Way by Now"	Simien, Williams	3:51
6.	"Hey Pocky Way/Fire on the Bayou/People Say"	Meters, Modeliste, Neville, Porter	6:19
7.	"Mardi Gras in the Country"	Simien, Williams	7:37
8.	"The Pianist"	Brownie, Butt	4:12
9.	"Pet de Kat Krewe"	Simien, Williams	5:54
10.	"Johnny Too Bad"	Baily, Bexford, Crooks, Winston	4:49
11.	"Iko Iko/When the Saints Go Marching In/Brother John/Jambalaya"	Crawford, Green, Hall, Hawkins, Poche, traditional, Williams	9:49
12.	"The Star-Spangled Banner"	Francis Scott Key	2:33
Total length:			1:04:11

== Personnel ==
- Jose Alvarez – Guitar, Vocals
- Bob Dylan – Composer
- Ralph Fontenot – Frottoir
- Alexandra Huddleston – Images, Photography
- Jillian Johnson – Package Design
- Francis Scott Key – Composer
- The Meters – Composer
- Ziggy Modeliste – Composer
- Joshua Murrell – Mastering, Mixing, Producer
- Cynthia Simien – Package Design
- Terrance Simien – Accordion, Arranger, Composer, Mastering, Mixing, Producer, Vocals
- Robert Sturman – Cover Image
- William Terry – Bass
- Danny Williams – Keyboards, Mastering, Mixing, Photography, Producer, Vocals
