= Zydeco Junkie =

Studio album by Chubby Carrier and the Bayou Swamp Band
- Released: July 20, 2010
- Genre: Zydeco
- Length: 41:40
- Label: Swampadellic Records

Chubby Carrier and the Bayou Swamp Band chronology
Live at Knuckleheads, Kansas City (2007)	Zydeco Junkie (2010)

Zydeco Junkie is an album by the Zydeco band Chubby Carrier and the Bayou Swamp Band, released in 2010. It received the 2010 Grammy Award for Best Zydeco or Cajun Music Album. Jamie Bergeron and Geno Delafose make special guest appearances.

== Reception ==
Dan Willging of OffBeat Magazine gave the album positive reviews citing the focused vocals and originality of the album.

== Awards ==
Zydeco Junkie won the Grammy award for Best Zydeco or Cajun Music Album. Also, it won the Best Zydeco Album from OffBeat Magazine for 2010.

== Track listing ==
No.	Title	Guest	Length
1.	"Zydeco Junkie"		4:22
2.	"Let's Make It Funky Tonight"		3:59
3.	"Touch Me Touch Me Baby"		4:33
4.	"Swampadellic"		3:25
5.	"Stop Wastin' My Time"		4:12
6.	"Movin' On Up"		4:11
7.	"Call Me"		4:18
8.	"Feel Like Makin' Love"		4:19
9.	"Jalapena Lena"	Geno Delafose	4:46
10.	"My Zydeco Shoes"	Jamie Bergeron	3:35
Total length:			41:40
