= Taking It Home =

Studio album by Buckwheat Zydeco
- Released: 1988
- Genre: Zydeco
- Label: Island
- Producer: Ted Fox

Buckwheat Zydeco chronology
On a Night Like This (1987)	Taking It Home (1988)	Where There's Smoke There's Fire (1990)

Taking It Home is a studio album by the zydeco musician Buckwheat Zydeco, released in 1988. Zydeco supported the album with a North American tour. The title was also used for a 1990 video release of a Buckwheat Zydeco show recorded in London.

The album peaked at No. 104 on the Billboard 200.

== Production ==
The album was produced by Ted Fox. It was recorded with Buckwheat Zydeco's eight-member band, Ils Sont Partis. Eric Clapton contributed a guitar solo to the cover of "Why Does Love Got To Be So Sad".

== Critical reception ==
Professional ratings
Review scores
Source	Rating
AllMusic	2.5/5 stars
The Encyclopedia of Popular Music	3/5 stars
Houston Chronicle	4.5/5 stars
MusicHound Folk: The Essential Album Guide	2.5/5 stars
The Rolling Stone Album Guide	3.5/5 stars

The St. Petersburg Times wrote that Buckwheat "mixed vibrant, up-to-the-minute sound quality and full production with the kinetic rootsiness of straight-up zydeco." The San Francisco Chronicle found the album to be inferior to On a Night Like This, but praised Buckwheat's decision to give "Clapton a chance to outdo his old solo on a romping, rollicking 'Why Does Love Got to Be So Sad'."

The Houston Chronicle stated: "Feasting off the Creole culture's self-renaissance of the '70s and '80s, [Buckwheat]'s been able to move zydeco into the contemporary marketplace without sacrificing its roots. That is the major accomplishment here." The Chicago Tribune thought that Taking It Home "finally crosses the line and becomes the nightmare purists always warned about... With few exceptions, the overblown, overly fast, repetitive pop tunes are mindless mainstream music with an accordion."

== Track listing ==
No.	Title	Length
1.	"Creole Country"	2:08
2.	"Down Dallas Alley"	4:13
3.	"These Things You Do"	3:37
4.	"Drivin' Old Grey"	4:59
5.	"Make a Change"	4:02
6.	"Why Does Love Got to Be So Sad"	4:43
7.	"Ooh Wow"	3:18
8.	"In and Out of My Life"	3:51
9.	"Taking It Home"	4:13
10.	"Creole Country Part 2"	1:40
