= Live at Knuckleheads, Kansas City =

Live album by Chubby Carrier and the Bayou Swamp Band
- Released: 2007
- Genre: Zydeco
- Length: 41:40
- Label: Swampadellic Records

Chubby Carrier and the Bayou Swamp Band chronology
| Bayou Road (2006) | Live at Knuckleheads, Kansas City (2007) | Zydeco Junkie (2010) |

Live at Knuckleheads, Kansas City is an album by the Grammy winning Zydeco band Chubby Carrier and the Bayou Swamp Band recorded at Knuckleheads Saloon in Kansas City, Missouri, and released in 2007.

== Track listing ==
| No. | Title | Length |
|---|---|---|
| 1. | "Bayou Road" | 4:11 |
| 2. | "Tule Tone Son Ton" | 5:20 |
| 3. | "Father of Fun" | 5:28 |
| 4. | "I Don't Know What You Come to Do" | 4:30 |
| 5. | "We Make a Good Gumbo" | 5:13 |
| 6. | "Cisco Kid" | 7:50 |
| 7. | "Who Stole the Hot Sauce" | 4:26 |
| 8. | "Rock Me Baby" | 6:48 |
| 9. | "Squeeze Box" | 5:35 |
| 10. | "Can't Wait to Go Back to Louisiana" | 3:50 |
| 11. | "Ain't No Party Like a Chubby Party" | 4:32 |
| 12. | "Zydeco Boogaloo" | 5:36 |
| Total length: | | 41:40 |
