= Tab Benoit =

American guitarist and singer (born 1967)

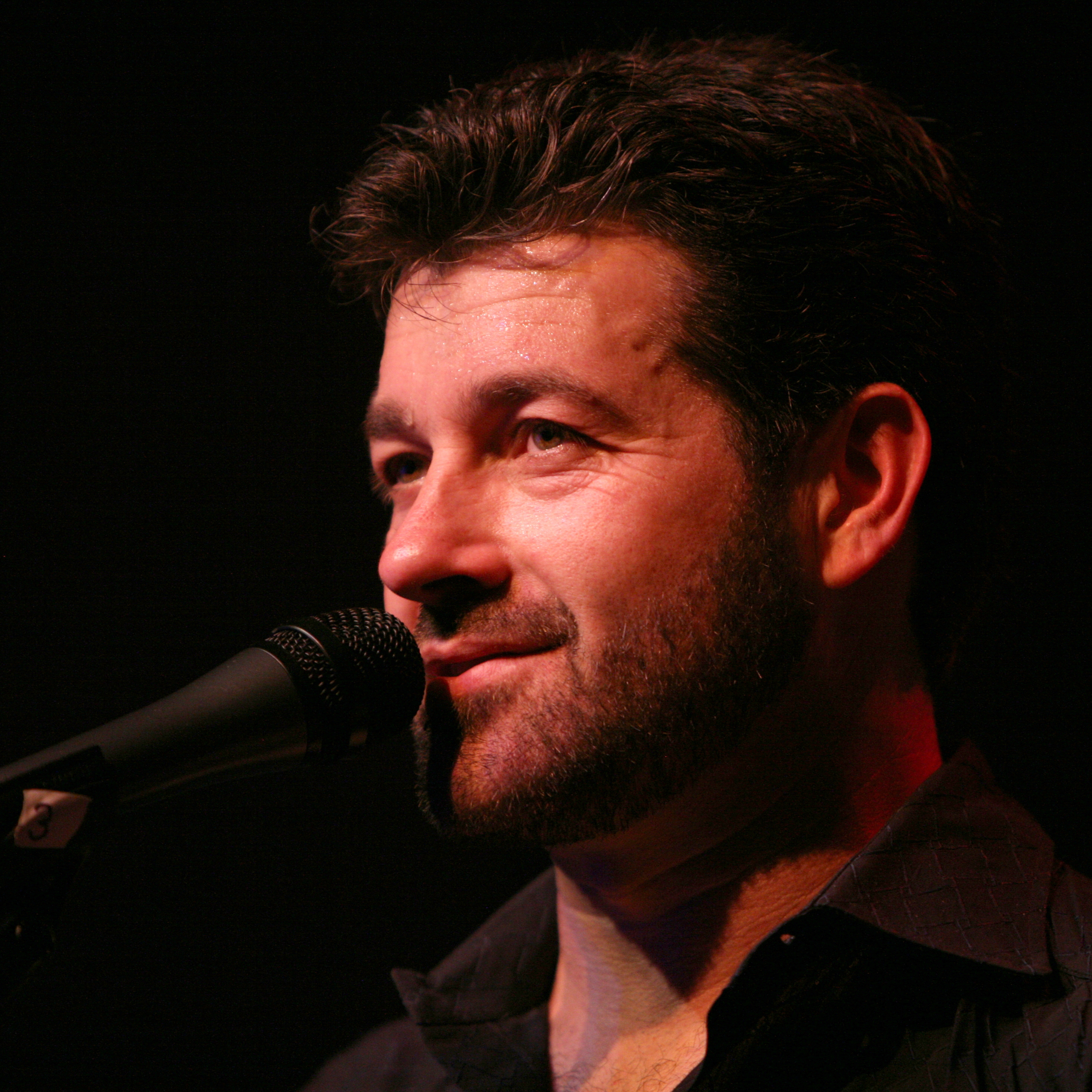
- Tab Benoit in February 2008

Background information
- Born: November 17, 1967 (age 58); Houma, Louisiana, U.S.
- Genres: Swamp blues, Soul blues, Chicago blues
- Occupations: Musician, songwriter
- Instruments: Vocals, guitar, drums
- Years active: 1987–present
- Label: Justice Records
- Website: tabbenoit.com

Tab Benoit (born November 17, 1967) is an American blues guitarist, musician, and singer. His playing combines a number of blues styles, primarily Delta blues.

He plays a stock 1972 Fender Telecaster Thinline electric guitar and writes his own musical compositions. Benoit graduated from Vandebilt Catholic High School in Houma, Louisiana, in May 1985. In 2003, he formed "Voice of the Wetlands," an organization promoting awareness of coastal wetlands preservation.

== Career ==
=== Early years ===
Benoit was born in Houma, Louisiana, United States. A guitar player since his teenage years, Benoit appeared at the Blues Box, a music club and cultural center in Baton Rouge run by guitarist Tabby Thomas. Playing guitar alongside Thomas, Raful Neal, Henry Gray, and other high-profile regulars at the club, Benoit learned the blues first-hand from several living blues legends. He formed a trio in 1987 and began playing clubs in Baton Rouge and New Orleans. He began touring other parts of the South two years later and started touring more of the United States in 1991. Today he continues to perform across the country.

Benoit was featured in the IMAX film, Hurricane on the Bayou.

== Development as an artist ==
Benoit landed a recording contract with Texas-based Justice Records and released a series of recordings, beginning in 1992 with Nice and Warm. These Blues Are All Mine was released on Vanguard in 1999 after Justice folded.

That same year, Benoit appeared on Homesick for the Road, a collaborative album on the Telarc label with fellow guitarists Kenny Neal and Debbie Davies. Homesick not only served as a showcase for three relatively young musicians, but also launched Benoit's relationship with Telarc, which came to fruition in 2002 with the release of Wetlands.

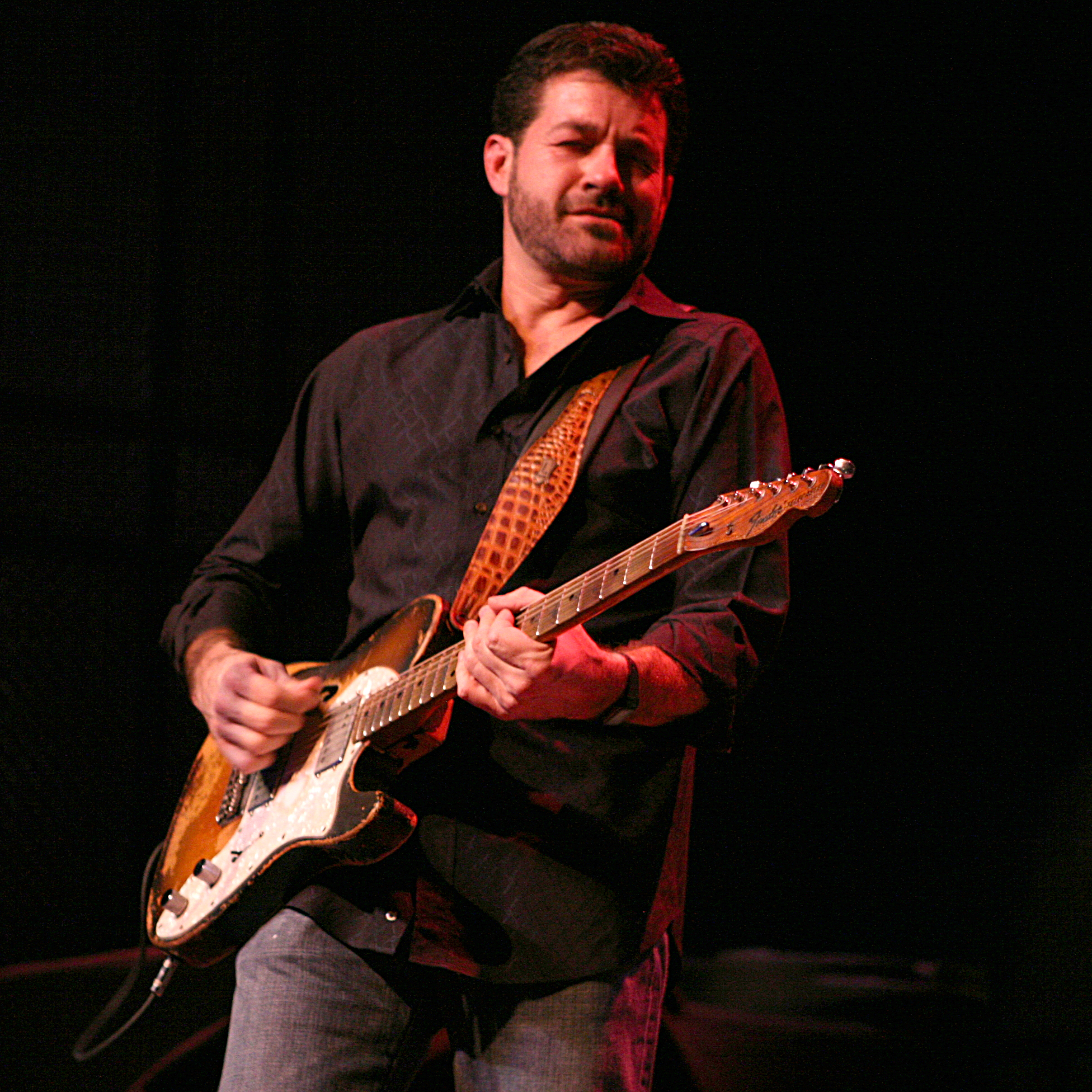
Benoit playing a Fender Telecaster

On Wetlands, Benoit mixed original material such as the autobiographical "When a Cajun Man Gets the Blues" and "Fast and Free" with Professor Longhair's "Her Mind Is Gone" and Otis Redding's "These Arms of Mine".

Later in 2002, Benoit released Whiskey Store, a collaborative recording with fellow guitarist and Telarc labelmate Jimmy Thackery, Charlie Musselwhite, and the Double Trouble rhythm section consisting of bassist Tommy Shannon and drummer Chris Layton.

In 2003, Benoit released Sea Saint Sessions, recorded at Big Easy Recording Studio in New Orleans. In addition to Benoit and his regular crew, bassist Carl Dufrene and drummer Darryl White, Sea Saint Sessions included guest appearances by Big Chief Monk Boudreaux, Cyril Neville, Brian Stoltz, and George Porter Jr. That same year, Benoit and Thackery took their dueling guitar show on the road, and recorded a March 2003 performance at the Unity Centre for Performing Arts in Unity, Maine. The result was Whiskey Store Live, released in February 2004.

Benoit's 2005 release was Fever for the Bayou, which also included guest appearances by Cyril Neville (vocals and percussion) and Big Chief Monk Boudreaux (vocals). In 2006, Benoit recorded Brother to the Blues with Louisiana's LeRoux. It was nominated for a Grammy Award for Best Traditional Blues Album. His cover of Buddy Miller's "Shelter Me" was the theme song for the Discovery Channel TV-series, Sons of Guns. In April 2011 Benoit released Medicine, featuring Anders Osborne, Michael Doucet of Beausoleil, and Ivan Neville.

== Honors ==
In 2007, Benoit won his first B.B. King Entertainer of the Year award presented by the Blues Music Awards, described variously as "the highest accolade afforded musicians and songwriters in Blues music" and "[t]he premier blues music event in the world".

Benoit was inducted into The Louisiana Music Hall of Fame (LMHOF) on May 16, 2010, at the LMHOF Louisiana Music Homecoming in Erwinville, Louisiana.

In 2012, Benoit won three separate Blues Music Awards: Contemporary Blues Male Artist; Contemporary Blues Album (for 2011's Medicine); and for the second time, B.B. King Entertainer of the Year.

2013 saw Benoit win the Blues Music Awards Contemporary Blues Male Artist for the second year in a row.

== Business ventures and activism ==
Benoit became owner of Tab Benoit's Lagniappe Music Cafe, situated in the downtown district of Houma, Louisiana.

Benoit has also been involved in conservation efforts on behalf of Louisiana wetlands. He is the founder of 'Voice of the Wetlands,' an organization promoting awareness of the receding coastal wetlands of Louisiana. In 2010, Benoit received the Governor's Award – Conservationist of the Year for 2009 by the Louisiana Wildlife Federation. He uses his music to promote the issues that plague Louisiana's imperiled coast to his national audience. One reason he founded the nonprofit Voice of the Wetlands Foundation (VOW) is to support outreach and education about Louisiana's Wetlands loss and how Louisiana's rich culture is also going away as its wetlands disappear.

He owns his own recording studio in Houma, Louisiana, and runs a record label, Whiskey Bayou Records. Benoit co-arranged and co-produced Alastair Greene's album, The New World Blues. The album was released on October 23, 2020.

== Discography ==
- 1993 – Nice and Warm
- 1994 – What I Live For
- 1995 – Standing on the Bank
- 1997 – Live: Swampland Jam
- 1998 – Homesick for the Road with Kenny Neal, Debbie Davies
- 1999 – These Blues are All Mine
- 2001 – Wetlands
- 2002 – Whiskey Store with Jimmy Thackery
- 2003 – The Sea Saint Sessions
- 2004 – Whiskey Store Live with Jimmy Thackery
- 2005 – Fever for the Bayou
- 2005 – Voice of the Wetlands – Voice of the Wetlands Allstars
- 2006 – Brother to the Blues with Louisiana's LeRoux
- 2007 – Power of the Pontchartrain with Louisiana's LeRoux
- 2008 – Night Train To Nashville with Louisiana's LeRoux
- 2011 – Medicine with Anders Osborne
- 2011 – Box of Pictures – Voice of the Wetlands Allstars
- 2012 – Legacy: The Best Of
- 2024 – I Hear Thunder with Anders Osborne
