= Michael Doucet =

American musician

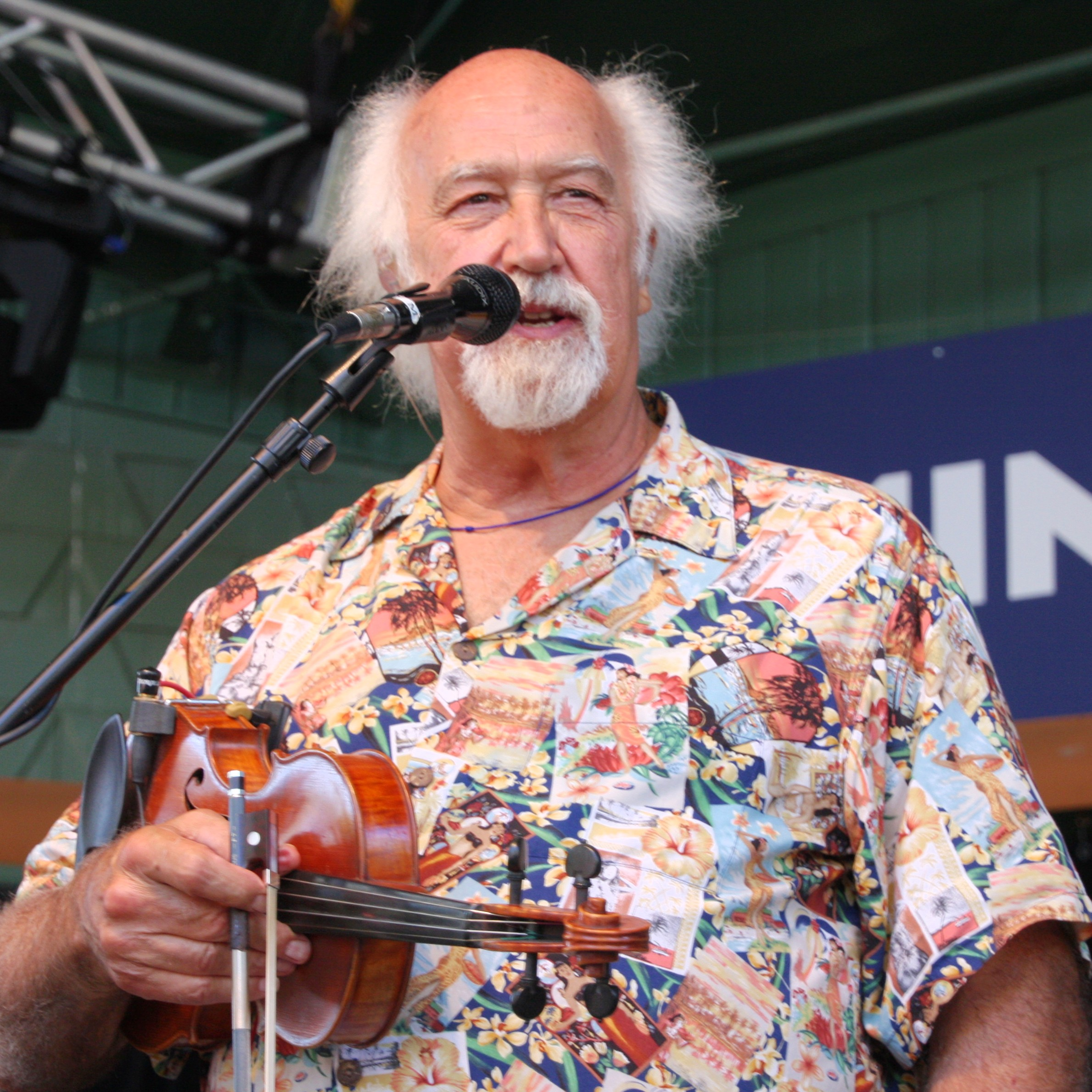
- Michael Doucet at the Minnesota State Fair, 2016

Background information
- Born: Michael Louis Doucet; February 14, 1951 (age 75); Scott, Louisiana, U.S.
- Genre: Cajun
- Occupations: Singer, musician
- Instrument: Cajun fiddle
- Years active: 1975–present
- Labels: Arhoolie, Swallow, Rounder, Smithsonian Folkways, Compass, Yep Roc
- Website: www.beausoleilmusic.com

Michael Louis Doucet (born February 14, 1951) is an American singer-songwriter and musician best known as the founder of the Cajun band BeauSoleil.

== Early life ==
Doucet was born in Scott, Louisiana, to a Cajun family. Family parties in the 1950s always included "French music." Two of his paternal aunts sang ballads, and many family members played musical instruments. He learned banjo at age six, guitar at eight, and belonged to a Cajun rock band with his cousin, Zachary Richard, at twelve.

== Career ==
In his early 20s, Doucet and his cousin went to France, and when he got home he added violin to his music studies. Violin became his primary instrument, though he also plays accordion and mandolin.

In 1975, he started the Cajun band Coteau, and two years later he started BeauSoleil with Kenneth Richard and Sterling Richard. BeauSoleil plays an eclectic combination of traditional Cajun music, blues, country, jazz, and zydeco. Doucet has been a member of a more traditional Cajun band, the Savoy-Doucet Cajun Band with Ann Savoy and Marc Savoy, and Fiddlers 4 with Darol Anger, Rushad Eggleston, and Bruce Molsky. He began teaching in 1977 at the University of Southwestern Louisiana.

Although Doucet did not originally intend to pursue performing Cajun music, a turning point came when he was awarded a Folk Arts Apprenticeship by the National Endowment for the Arts. "I had planned to go to graduate school in New Mexico to study the Romantic poets," he recalls on the Vanguard Records web site. "Instead I traded William Blake for Dewey Balfa." Doucet sought out every surviving Cajun musician, including Balfa, Dennis McGee, Sady Courville, Luderin Darbone, Varise Conner, Canray Fontenot, Freeman Fontenot and others. He studied their techniques and songs and encouraged some to resume public performances.

== Awards and honors ==
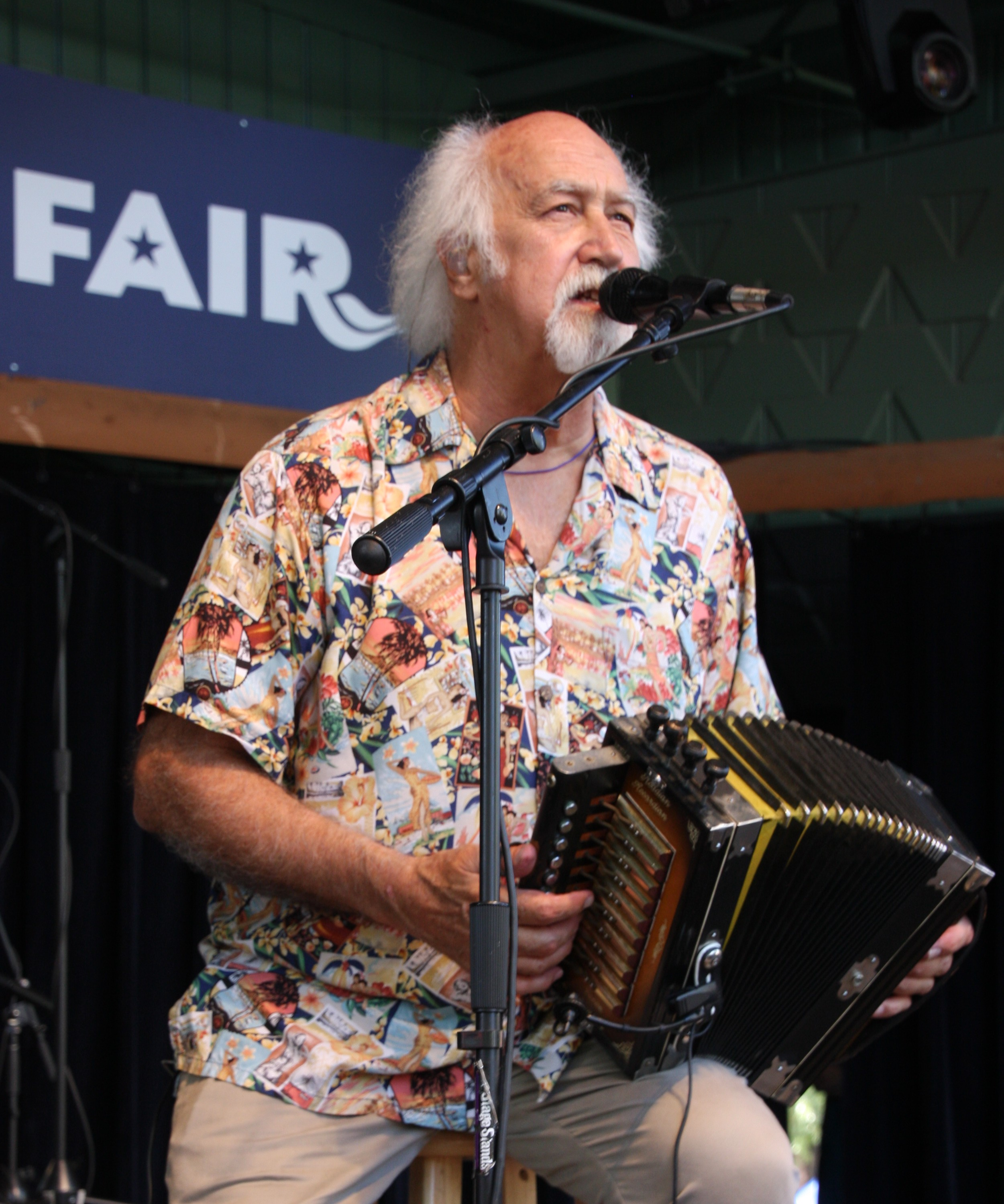
Doucet on accordion

In 1975, Doucet received an NEA Folk Arts Apprenticeship Grant to study Cajun fiddle styles from masters such as Varise Conner, Hector Duhon, Canray Fontenot, Lionel LeLeux, and Dennis McGee.

In 2005 Doucet received a National Heritage Fellowship awarded by the National Endowment for the Arts, which is the United States' highest honor in the folk and traditional arts. Two years later, he was named a USA Collins Family Foundation Fellow and awarded a $50,000 grant by United States Artists, a public charity that supports and promotes the work of American artists.

== Discography ==
- Cajun Jam Sessions (Arhoolie, 1983)
- Dit Beausoleil (Arhoolie, 1983)
- Parlez-Nous a Boire (Arhoolie, 1984)
- Christmas Bayou (Swallow, 1986)
- Allons a Lafayette (Arhoolie, 1988)
- Hot Chili Mama (Arhoolie, 1988)
- Michael Doucet & Cajun Brew (Rounder, 1988)
- Beau Solo (Arhoolie, 1989)
- Déjá Vu (Swallow, 1991)
- Le Hoogie Boogie: Louisiana French Music for Children (Rounder, 1992)
- Fiddlers 4 (Compass, 2002)
- From Now On (Smithsonian Folkways, 2008)
- Alligator Purse (Yep Roc, 2009)
- Live at the 2008 New Orleans Jazz & Heritage Festival (MunckMix, 2009)
- Belizaire the Cajun (soundtrack) (Arhoolie, 2011)
- From Bamako to Carencro (Compass, 2013)
- Cajun Fandango (Parhelion, 2016)

== See also ==
- History of Cajun music
- List of people related to Cajun music
