= Lisa Haley (musician) =

American musician

Lisa Haley is an American Grammy-nominated musician known for her Cajun zydeco music. Her 2007 album, King Cake, reached number 15 on Billboard 's World Albums chart.

== Early life ==
Haley is the descendant of Irish immigrants and is related to Bill Haley of Bill Haley & the Comets. She was classically trained as a violinist, parlaying her knowledge of the instrument into fiddling, a form of music close to her Southern roots.

== Career ==
Haley is a fourth-generation fiddler whose mentors included Grammy-winning zydeco pioneer Queen Ida. With her band, the Zydekats, Haley has played numerous venues and festivals across the world, including NoHo Summer Nights, FolkWorks Folk/Roots Festival, the Annual Orange County Cajun Food & Music Celebration, the Annual Decatur Celebration, the Wildlife West Music Festival, the Simi Valley Cajun & Blues Music Festival, the Rainforest World Music Festival, the Blue Water Music Festival, the Kaleidoscope Art & Music Festival, the Sacramento Music Festival, Redlands Bowl Summer Music Festival, Irvine Global Village Festival, Sawdust Festival, Ragin' Cajun Crawfish Jamboree, Silverado Days Festival, Irmo Okra Strut, Snowy Range Music Festival, Solstice Music Festival, and others.

== Personal life ==
Haley is a practicing Christian.

== Discography ==
- Joy Ride (2016)
- Absolutely Live! (2016)
- Lisa Haley & the Zydekats (2008)
- King Cake (2007)
- All the Way Live! (2005)
- Talking to the Sun (2002)
- Louisiana (2001)
- Waiting for the Sky...(1997)
- Lisa Haley & the Zydekats (1996)

== Awards and nominations ==
Awards	Year	Recipient(s) and nominee(s)	Category	Result	Ref.
Grammy Awards	2007	Lisa Haley	Best Zydeco Or Cajun Music Album	Nominated	
Los Angeles Music Awards	1996	Lisa Haley		Nominated	
