= David Egan (musician) =

American singer-songwriter

David Egan (March 20, 1954 – March 18, 2016) was an American pianist, songwriter and singer, who composed and performed rock, Cajun-rock, soul, and blues music.

== Life and career ==
Reuben David Egan was born in Shreveport, Louisiana to attorney Reuben White Egan and the opera singer Jasmine Fleming Egan. After studying jazz theory at the University of North Texas, Egan worked as a jingle writer in Memphis, then moved to Nashville where, while working at making inroads in song-writing, he made a living driving a tour bus. He was soon invited to join the Louisiana band A-Train; that led to an invitation to tour with Jo-El Sonnier, and then he spent a decade touring the world with the Cajun band Filé.

In 1991, a song that Egan wrote with Buddy Flett, "Please No More", was covered by Joe Cocker and that led to a long line of high-profile artists recording his songs. He released three critically acclaimed albums with his own band, Lil Band O Gold. In 2001, he was awarded a Louisiana Division of the Arts Fellowship.

Egan was married to Rhonda Ball Egan; they had one son. He died of cancer in Lafayette at the age of 61.

== Discography ==
As Performer:

- Jo-El Sonnier – Tears Of Joy (1991)
- Filé – La Vie Marron: The Runaway Life (1996)
- Little Alfred - Dealin' With the Feelin (1996)
- Trout Fishing in America – Reel Life (1996)
- Jo-El Sonnier – Cajun Pride (1997)
- Warren Storm – Live and in the Studio (1999)
- The Cajun All-Stars – Chez Les Cajuns (1999)
- Lil’ Band O’ Gold – Lil’ Band O’ Gold (2000)
- Nathan Williams and the Zydeco Cha-Chas – Let’s Go! (2000)
- C.C. Adcock – House Rocker (2000)
- Filé – Hang On To Your Chapeau! (2000)
- Marc Broussard – Momentary Setback (2002)
- Evangeline Made: A Tribute to Cajun Music (2002)
- A-Train – Live at Humfrees/River of People (2002)
- David Egan – Twenty Years of Trouble (2003)
- BeauSoleil Avec Michael Doucet – Gitane Cajun (2004)
- Marc Broussard – Carencro (2004)
- Solomon Burke – Make Do with What You Got (2005)
- Kevin Gordon – O Come Look At The Burning (2005)
- Irma Thomas – After the Rain (2006)
- Extra Golden – Hera Ma Nono (2007)
- Goin' Home: A Tribute to Fats Domino (2007)
- Irma Thomas – Simply Grand (2008)
- David Egan – You Don't Know Your Mind (2008)
- Webb Wilder – More Like Me (2009)
- Johanna Divine – Mile High Rodeo (2010)
- Bobby Charles – Timeless (2010)
- John Trahan – My Louisiana (2010)
- Lil’ Band O’ Gold – "The Promised Land: A Swamp Pop Journey" (2011)
- The Revelers – The Revelers (2012)
- Maya And The Ruins – Take This Song With You (2012)
- David Egan – David Egan (2013)
- Dirk Powell – Walking Through Clay (2014)

As Composer:

- The Chenille Sisters – 123 for Kids (1990)
- Joe Cocker – Night Calls (1991)
- Trout Fishing in America – Big Trouble (1991)
- Jimmy Witherspoon – The Blues, The Whole Blues, And Nothing But The Blues (1992)
- Maura O'Connell – Blue Is the Colour of Hope (1992)
- Trout Fishing in America – Over the Limit (1992)
- John Mayall – Wake Up Call (1993)
- Bill Mumy and Robert Haimer – The Dinosaur Album: A Musical Adventure Through The Jurassic Age (1993)
- Percy Sledge – Blue Night (1994)
- The Bluebirds – Swamp Stomp (1994)
- Miranda Louise – Mama Told Me (1995)
- Cate Brothers – Radioland (1995)
- Little Buster – Right on Time (1995)
- Filé – La Vie Marron: The Runaway Life (1996)
- The Bluebirds – South from Memphis (1996)
- Tracy Nelson – Move On (1997)
- Cate Brothers – Struck a Vein (1997)
- Vernon Garrett – Half Past the Blues (1997)
- Miranda Louise – Face in My Dreams (1997)
- Chris Belleau & The Zydeco Hounds – Shake It Don't Break It (1997)
- Terry Evans – Come To The River (1997)
- Marcia Ball, Irma Thomas and Tracy Nelson – Sing It (1998)
- Johnny Adams – Man of My Word (1998)
- Michelle Willson – Tryin' to Make a Little Love (1999)
- Filé – Hang On To Your Chapeau! (2000)
- Lil’ Band O’ Gold – Lil’ Band O’ Gold (2000)
- Nathan Williams and the Zydeco Cha-Chas – Let’s Go (2000)
- Chris Ardoin & Double Clutchin' – Best Kept Secret (2000)
- Tinsley Ellis – Kingpin (2000)
- The Fabulous Thunderbirds – This Night in LA (2001)
- Michelle Willson – Wake-Up Call (2001)
- Theryl DeClouet – The Houseman Cometh! (2001)
- Tracy Nelson – Ebony and Irony (2001)
- John Mayall – Along for the Ride (2001)
- Barbara Carr – On My Own (2002)
- A-Train – Live at Humfrees/River of People (2002)
- Marc Broussard – Momentary Setback (2002)
- David Egan – Twenty Years of Trouble (2003)
- The Bluebirds – Highway 80 East (2003)
- Etta James – Let's Roll (2003)
- C.C. Adcock – The Lafayette Marquis (2004)
- Cate Brothers – Play By The Rules (2004)
- Black Cat Bone – Taylormade (2005)
- Solomon Burke – Make Do With What You Got (2005)
- Buddy Flett – Mississippi Sea (2007)
- Papa Mali – Do Your Thing (2007)
- Tab Benoit – Power of the Pontchartrain (2007)
- Marcia Ball – Peace, Love & BBQ (2008)
- XNA AllStars – XNA AllStars (2008)
- Lil’ Band O’ Gold – "The Promised Land: A Swamp Pop Journey" (2011)
- Gregg Martinez – South of the Parish Line (2011)
- Otis Clay – Truth Is (2013)
