= Turn the Page (disambiguation) =

"Turn the Page" is a 1971 Bob Seger song, also covered by Jon English (1974), Waylon Jennings (1985), and Metallica (1998)

Turn the Page may also refer to:

== Music ==
=== Albums ===
- Turn the Page (Chris Ardoin album) or the title song, 1998
- Turn the Page (Waylon Jennings album), 1985

=== Songs ===
- "Turn the Page" (Bobby Valentino song), 2006
- "Turn the Page", a song by Aaliyah from the soundtrack of the film Music of the Heart, 1999
- "Turn the Page", by Blind Guardian from A Twist in the Myth, 2006
- "Turn the Page", by Chantal Kreviazuk from What If It All Means Something, 2002
- "Turn the Page", by Hypocrisy from Catch 22, 2002
- "Turn the Page", by Rush from Hold Your Fire, 1987
- "Turn the Page", by the Streets from Original Pirate Material, 2002

== Other media ==
- "Turn the Page" (Californication), a 2007 TV episode
- Turn the Page, a 2006 e-book in the Starfleet Corps of Engineers series
