= Gonna Take You Downtown =

Studio album by Beau Jocque
- Released: 1996
- Studio: Ultrasonic
- Genre: Zydeco
- Label: Rounder
- Producer: Scott Billington

Beau Jocque chronology
Git It, Beau Jocque! (1995)	Gonna Take You Downtown (1996)	Check It Out, Lock It In, Crank It Up! (1998)

Gonna Take You Downtown is an album by the American musician Beau Jocque, released in 1996. He is credited with his band, the Zydeco Hi-Rollers. Issued as a vinyl dance track, "Make It Stank (Special Aromatic Dance Mix)" was a regional radio hit. Jocque supported the album with a North American tour.

The Scottish writer James Kelman used lyrics from the title track in his 2016 book, Dirt Road.

== Production ==
Recorded in New Orleans, the album was produced by Scott Billington. Its sound was influenced by funk and hard rock. "Make It Stank (Special Aromatic Dance Mix)" employed tape loops and samples.

"I'm on the Wonder" is a cover of the Clifton Chenier song. "The Back Door" is a cover of the D. L. Menard song. A talk box was used on the covers of "Cisco Kid" and "Knockin' on Heaven's Door".

== Critical reception ==
Professional ratings
Review scores
Source	Rating
AllMusic	4.5/5 stars
MusicHound World: The Essential Album Guide	4/5 stars
Orlando Sentinel	4/5 stars
The Penguin Guide to Blues Recordings	2/4 stars

The Chicago Reader wrote that Jocque has "pumped up his zydeco with the energy of rock, somehow incorporating that style's forceful backbeat without letting it dominate." The Orlando Sentinel stated that "Jocque has a deep, imposing growl of a voice, and his style has a strong funk-soul influence," writing that "the only misstep is a rather pointless addition to the long list of covers of Bob Dylan's 'Knockin' on Heaven's Door'." The Denver Post determined that "Jocque groans and cries like a possessed John Lee Hooker."

Guitar Player deemed the album "brimming with righteous rhythms, from the deep, offbeat pocket of Caribbean mento to the sultry swing of roots reggae and the full-bore zydeco romps." Miami New Times opined: "There's some good, smoking stuff here, with a few Jocque originals that extend the legacy of zydeco and rock like mad in the process. Judging by the covers, though, Beau don't know his own considerable strengths." City Pages listed Gonna Take You Downtown as the 18th best album of 1996.

AllMusic wrote that "the things that set Jocque's band apart from other zydeco mainstays are the infusions of rock and funk, usually more or less missing from the genre." The Village Voice concluded that the band "have perfected a superheroic woofer-whomping blend of Louisiana accordions and lubricious funk."

== Track listing ==
No.	Title	Length
1.	"Gonna Take You Downtown"
2.	"Cisco Kid"
3.	"Allé Parti pour Voi Beau Jocque (Going to See Beau Jocque)"
4.	"I'm on the Wonder"
5.	"The Back Door"
6.	"Boogie Woogie All Nite Long"
7.	"It's So Easy When You're Breezin'"
8.	"A Little Love Always Make It Bettah"
9.	"Just One Kiss"
10.	"Knockin' on Heaven's Door"
11.	"Kinder 2 Step"
12.	"Make It Stank (Special Aromatic Dance Mix)"
