= Kevin Gordon =

Kevin Gordon may refer to:

- Kevin Gordon (rugby league)
- Kevin Gordon (musician)
