= Pick Up on This! =

Studio album by Beau Jocque
- Released: 1994
- Recorded: October 1993
- Genre: Zydeco
- Label: Rounder
- Producer: Scott Billington

Beau Jocque chronology
Beau Jocque Boogie (1993)	Pick Up on This! (1994)	My Name Is Beau Jocque (1994)

Pick Up on This! is an album by the American musician Beau Jocque, released in 1994. He is credited with his band, the Zydeco Hi-Rollers. Beau Jocque supported the album with North American and United Kingdom tours.

== Production ==
Recorded in October 1993, the album was produced by Scott Billington; Billington later called Beau Jocque among the producer's most exciting finds. "Hucklebuck" is a version of the dance tune. "Zydeco Boogie Woogie" is an interpretation of John Lee Hooker's "Boogie Chillen'". "Give It to Me" uses scratches by a New Orleans turntablist. Pick Up on This! ends with an interpolation of War's "Low Rider".

== Critical reception ==
Professional ratings
Review scores
Source	Rating
AllMusic	4.5/5 stars
The Atlanta Journal-Constitution	3.5/4 stars
Austin American-Statesman	3/4 stars
MusicHound Folk: The Essential Album Guide	4.5/5 stars
The Penguin Guide to Blues Recordings	2.5/4 stars

The Baltimore Sun wrote that when the Rollers "get into a groove, they stay there until the song is over... That's one reason why Pick Up on This! makes for such great party music." The Austin American-Statesman said that the album "reconfirms the band's dancefloor dynamism, though the derivativeness of the material makes it more conducive to quick stepping than close listening." The Washington Post praised Beau Jocque's "eerie Howlin' Wolf-like baritone."

The Philadelphia Inquirer concluded that, "unlike many zydeco artists, whose recordings are stiff, Jocque and the Hi-Rollers sound as loose as they do in performance." Rolling Stone likened the album to "a shotgun wedding of Clifton Chenier and ZZ Top officiated by John Lee Hooker." The Times Colonist stated that the "zydeco is grounded in the band's grinding, funk-inspired back beat." Spin deemed the album "the hottest zydeco ever: a mixture of Cajun, funk, rock 'n' roll, and blues."

AllMusic wrote that "the key is in the groove—there might not be much variety on the album, but [Beau Jocque] keeps the zesty zydeco rhythms pumping throughout."

== Track listing ==
No.	Title	Length
1.	"Give It to Me"
2.	"Gardez Donc! (Look at That!)"
3.	"Zydeco Boogie Woogie"
4.	"Mardi Gras Blues"
5.	"Comin' In"
6.	"Don't Tell Your Mama, Don't Tell Your Papa"
7.	"Yesterday"
8.	"Do Right Sometime"
9.	"Hucklebuck"
10.	"Pick Up on This"
11.	"Chere Mignonne (Dear Cute One)"
12.	"Hi-Rollers Theme/Low Rider"
