= Road Trip (Girl Authority album) =

Studio album by Girl Authority
- Released: March 13, 2007
- Recorded: 2006–2007
- Genre: Rock, pop, children's music, teen pop
- Label: Zoë Records
- Producer: Scott Billington, Samantha Hammel, Liza Levy

Girl Authority chronology
Girl Authority (2006)	Road Trip (2007)	Halloween Party Songs (2007)

Professional ratings
Review scores
Source	Rating
AllMusic	link

Road Trip is the second and final album from American girl group Girl Authority. Unlike the first album, Road Trip is a mixture of cover songs and original songs performed by Girl Authority. Road Trip is also featured with a DVD, documenting a behind the scenes glance into the production of the album and the girls.

In the February, "Girl Talk" featuring "Urban Girl" Gina, she explains a few of the upcoming songs and the meaning behind the title of their second album.

Hi everyone! The countdown is on for our new CD, and we are soooo excited! We even recorded a Girl Authority theme song, and it’s so cool! The chorus of the theme song is: "Girl Authority! Be the girl you want to be!" We love that, because each of us in Girl Authority is unique, and that’s the message we want to send to you, our most awesome fans: Be yourself and don’t let anyone tell you otherwise! Our new CD is called "Road Trip," and it’s about all of us taking a vacation all across the USA. One thing we found out is that every city in the US is way different. There’s so much to explore and learn about in each city, and we’ll be telling you all about it in the upcoming months. We are so proud to be American girls, because America celebrates so many differences.

Featured on this album is also a version of the early previously unreleased Depeche Mode song called "Let's Get Together" that Vince Clarke re-wrote for Girl Authority. Cyndi Lauper wrote "Shine", a ballad, featured on the album. Tanya Donelly wrote four tracks for the album, including the group's new signature song titled "This Is My Day". The album reached No. 30 on the Billboard Top Heatseekers chart and No. 10 on the Top Kid Audio chart. With the release of Road Trip, the group's EP, Halloween Party Songs was sold along with the album at iParty stores as a promotion.

== Track listing ==
1. "Let's Get Together" (Vince Clarke) 2:53
2. "Holiday" (Curtis Hudson) 4:41 – Madonna
3. "Life Is a Highway" (Tom Cochrane) 3:54 – Tom Cochrane
4. "Rhythm of the World" (Savan Kotecha, Nadir Khayat, Darryl Zero, Calanit Ledan) 3:44 – Ch!pz
5. "We Are Family" (Nile Rodgers, Bernard Edwards) 3:42 – Sister Sledge
6. "Reach" (Gloria Estefan, Diane Warren) 3:49 – Gloria Estefan
7. "My Wild Side" (Andrea Wasse, Rob Wells, Christopher Ward) 2:56
8. "This Is My Day" (Tanya Donelly) 3:10
9. "The Loco-Motion" (Gerry Goffin, Carole King) 3:18 – Little Eva, Grand Funk Railroad, Kylie Minogue
10. "Vacation" (Charlotte Caffey, Kathy Valentine, Jane Wiedlin) 2:53 – The Go-Go's
11. "Car Wash (Girl Authority Mix)" (Norman Whitfield) 3:50 – Rose Royce
12. "Shine" (Cyndi Lauper, William Wittman) 4:08 – Cyndi Lauper
13. "Walking On Sunshine" (Kimberley Rew) 3:51 – Katrina and the Waves
14. "Here to Stay" (Christina Aguilera, Heather Noelle Holley, George Henry Jackson) 3:14 – Christina Aguilera
15. "Dancin' in the Streets" (Ivy Hunter, Marvin Gaye, William Stevenson) 2:59 – Martha and the Vandellas
16. "This One's for the Girls" (Chris Hunter, Hillary Lindsey, Aimee Mayo) 4:01 – Martina McBride
17. "Perfect Day" (Timothy James Price, Antonio Armato) 3:30 – Hoku
18. "Don't Stop" (Christine McVie) 3:29 – Fleetwood Mac
19. "Girl Authority (Theme)" (Scott Billington, Steve Bonner) 3:35
