= After the Rain (Irma Thomas album) =

Studio album by Irma Thomas
- Released: April 25, 2006
- Venue: Maurice, Louisiana, United States
- Studio: Dockside
- Genre: Blues, R&B
- Label: Rounder

Irma Thomas chronology
My Heart's in Memphis: The Songs of Dan Penn (2000)	After the Rain (2006)	Two Phases of Irma Thomas (2007)

Professional ratings
Review scores
Source	Rating
PopMatters	7/10
The Guardian	4/5 stars
The Vinyl District	A−

After the Rain is the eighteenth studio album by Irma Thomas. After the Rain won Best Contemporary Blues Album at the 49th Annual Grammy Awards, the first Grammy Award for Thomas, and the second-ever Grammy win by a woman in this category, after Etta James.

The album was recorded at the Dockside Studios in Maurice, Louisiana, only months after Hurricane Katrina destroyed Thomas's home in New Orleans.

== Track listing ==
No.	Title	Writer(s)	Length
1.	"In the Middle of It All"	Arthur Alexander	4:45
2.	"Flowers"	Gwil Owen / Kevin Gordon	4:22
3.	"I Count the Tears"	Doc Pomus / Mort Shuman	3:03
4.	"Make Me a Pallet on Your Floor"	traditional	4:30
5.	"I Wish I Knew How It Would Feel to Be Free"	Billy Taylor	3:03
6.	"If You Knew How Much"	David Egan	2:27
7.	"Another Man Done Gone"	Irma Thomas / Scott Billington / Traditional	3:49
8.	"Till I Can't Take It Anymore"	Clyde Otis	3:27
9.	"These Honey Dos"	Corey Harris / David Egan / Irma Thomas	4:27
10.	"Another Lonely Heart"	Eleni Mandell	4:20
11.	"Soul of a Man"	Blind Willie Johnson	3:01
12.	"Stone Survivor"	David Egan	3:49
13.	"Shelter in the Rain"	Stevie Wonder	4:14

== Personnel ==
- Irma Thomas - vocals
- David Egan - piano
- Charles "Chucky C" Elam, III - background vocals
- Corey Harris - acoustic guitar, electric guitar
- Sonny Landreth - slide guitar
- Stanton Moore - drums, percussion
- Dirk Powell - fiddle, fretless banjo, acoustic guitar, electric guitar
- James Singleton - acoustic bass
- David Torkanowsky - Hammond B3 organ, piano
- Juanita Brooks - background vocals
- Marc Broussard - background vocals
