= Nathan Williams (Zydeco) =

American zydeco musician (born 1963)

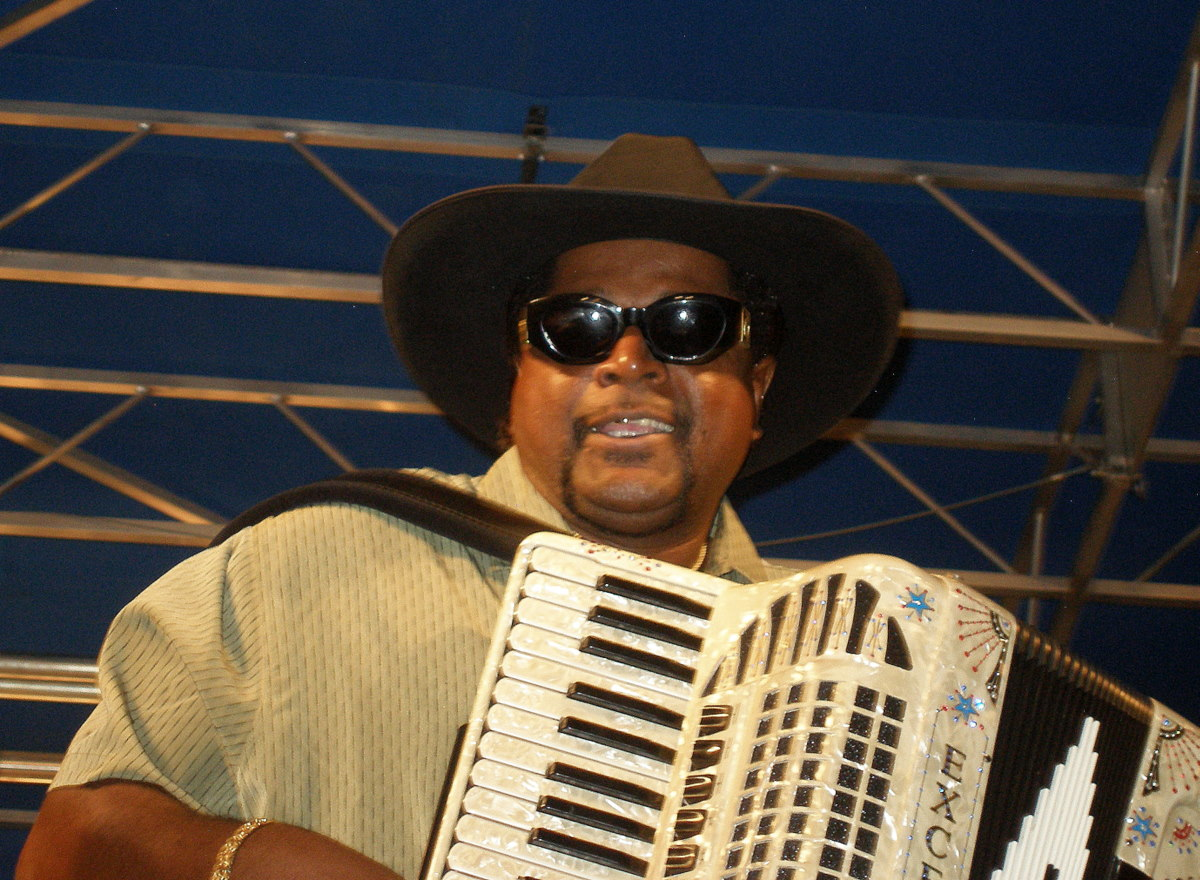
- Williams performing at the Thirsty Ear Festival Santa Fe, New Mexico in 2009

Background information
- Born: Nathan Williams; March 24, 1963 (age 63); St. Martinville, Louisiana, U.S.
- Genres: Zydeco, blues
- Occupations: Musician, singer, songwriter
- Instruments: Accordion, vocals
- Years active: 1985–present
- Labels: Rounder, Cha Cha Records
- Spouse: Nancy Calais Williams (m.1986)
- Website: zydecochachas.com

Nathan Williams Sr. (born March 24, 1963) is an American zydeco accordionist, singer and songwriter. He established his band Nathan & the Zydeco Cha Chas in 1985.

== Early life ==
Williams grew up Catholic in a French Creole-speaking home in St. Martinville, Louisiana, the youngest of seven children. Williams lost his father when he was seven years old.

He developed his musical sensibility in his hometown, a place rich in folk tradition, following in the footsteps of his uncle, the Creole guitarist Harry Hypolite, who was a band member with both Clifton Chenier and later with his son C. J. Chenier. The young Williams eagerly sought out the music of zydeco originators such as Chenier. When he was too young to attend a Chenier dance at a St. Martinville club, he hovered by the window-sized fan at the back of the building to hear his idol, only to have the bill of his baseball cap clipped off by the fan when he leaned too close.

When he was 13, Williams moved to Lafayette, Louisiana to live with his older brother Sid and his wife. He worked in Sid's grocery store. Later, while recovering from a serious illness, Nathan decided to dedicate himself to learning the accordion. He began practicing in the bathroom because he did not want anyone to hear him play. His main mentor was Buckwheat Zydeco, although his biggest influence was Chenier. Sid Williams purchased his brother's first accordion from Buckwheat Zydeco.

== Career ==
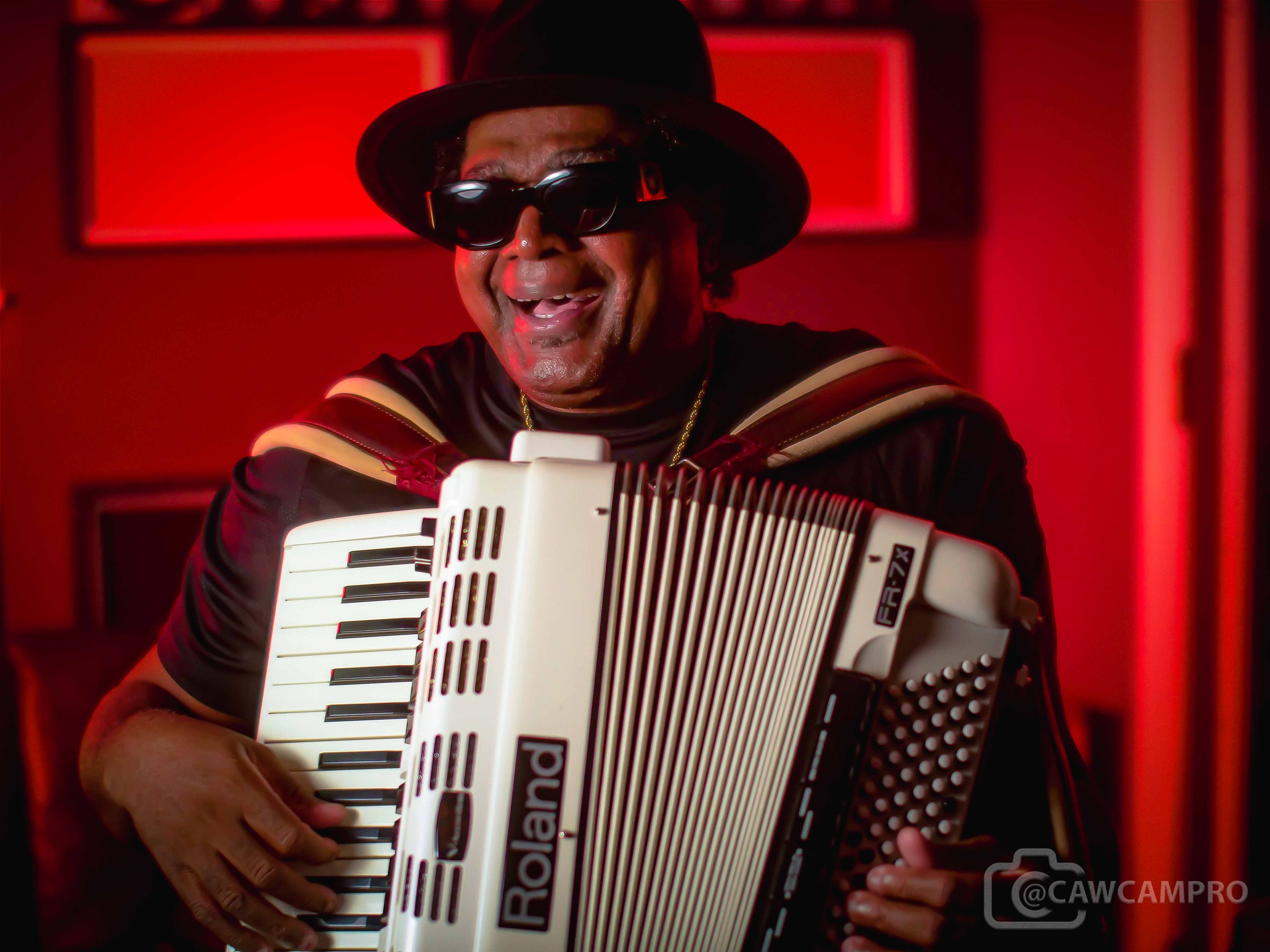
Williams in 2022

Williams began playing professionally around the age of 21. Five years after graduating from high school, Williams was recording 45s on his brother's El Sid independent record label. Sid opened a club in Lafayette, El-Sid-O's, and Nathan became a regular Friday night performer there.

Williams got his lucky break after Buckwheat Zydeco had left Rounder Records for Island Records. Rounder was in need of an accordionist to fill a spot on a project they had lined up. Buckwheat Zydeco suggested Williams for the position; he auditioned and got the recording contract. In 1985, he formed his band, Nathan & the Zydeco Cha-Chas, with which he plays to this day. Williams named the band after a Chenier instrumental song. In 1988, Williams and the band performed for the first time at the New Orleans Jazz & Heritage Festival.

The Cha Chas played at the New Orleans Rock n' Bowl for the first time in November 1992. After their successful performances as well as those by John Delafose and Beau Jocques, the venue began to host zydeco bands every Thursday night beginning in spring 1993. In 1997, Williams released a live album recorded at the club, titled I'm a Zydeco Hog: Live at the Rock 'N' Bowl, New Orleans. Nathan and the Zydeco Cha Chas performed at the 30th anniversary celebration of the venue in November 2018.

Early in his career, The New York Times wrote that the then-25 year old Williams was "poised to become important; already he is being mentioned as one of the people revitalizing the genre". A few months later, the newspaper described him as "rightly considered one of the best young zydeco musicians in Louisiana".

His musical style combines elements of zydeco, jazz, blues and R&B. Williams writes most of the band's original tunes.

For more than three decades, Nathan & the Zydeco Cha Chas have toured widely, performing at venues as diverse as his brother's convenience store in Lafayette, Louisiana to the Lincoln Center in New York and the Grand Ole Opry in Nashville, Tennessee. The Cha Chas performed at the 1996 Summer Olympics in Atlanta. Internationally, he has performed in Austria, Spain, France, Japan, the Netherlands, Turkey and Germany, among others. They were the first zydeco band to perform in Poland.

From its inception, the band has included members of the Williams family, with Nathan on accordion and lead vocals, older brother Dennis Paul Williams on guitar, first cousin Mark Anthony ("Chukka") Williams on rubboard, and brother Sid as manager. Other Williams family band members have included his son, accordionist and keyboardist Nathan Williams Jr., cousin Allen Williams on bass, nephew Djuan on rubboard and accordion. Non-family band members have included bassists Paul Newman and Wayne Burns, drummers Herman "Rat" Brown and Gerard St. Julien Jr., Clifford Alexander on rubboard, and Allen "Cat Roy" Broussard on saxophones.

On his 1995 album Creole Crossroads, Williams teamed up with Cajun fiddler Michael Doucet from the band BeauSoleil. At the time, collaborations between zydeco and Cajun musicians were rare.

In 2008, Williams played accordion on Buddy Guy's album Skin Deep.

In 2013, he founded his own record label, Cha Cha Records, which releases albums by both Williams Sr. and Williams Jr.

In 2022, Nathan & the Zydeco Cha Chas toured with the Dirty Dozen Brass Band, playing 30 dates across the United States, promoted as the Mardi Gras Mambo Tour.

Nathan & the Zydeco Cha-Chas were nominated for a 2023 Grammy Award in the Best Regional Roots Music Album category, for Lucky Man.

== Personal life ==
When he is not touring, Williams runs a trucking company named Cha Cha Hot Shot Service that hauls equipment for the Louisiana oil and gas industry.

Williams met his future wife Nancy when he was 16 years old. They were high school sweethearts. He said "Once I met her, that was it. I have a nice wife, a nice family. I make a decent living. I enjoy what I'm doing." The couple have three children.

Nathan Williams Jr. began performing with the Cha Chas at age 3, playing the rubboard. He released his debut album Zydeco Ballin' in 2002, at age 14. Since then, he has led his own band, Lil' Nathan and the Zydeco Big Timers, playing accordion and keyboards.

Williams' youngest son Naylan is also a musician and record producer. He played most of the instruments on his father's 2022 album Lucky Man.

His older brother Dennis Paul Williams, in addition to being a jazz and zydeco guitarist, is a well-known visual artist, whose mixed media works have been exhibited in multiple U.S. cities and in Europe. His paintings were featured in a 2013 book titled Soul Exchange and appear on the covers of two books by poet John Warner Smith.

== Discography ==
=== Studio and live albums ===
Album title	Record label	Stock number	Release year
Zydeco Live!: Direct From Richard's Club, Lawtell, Louisiana (with Boozoo Chavis)	Rounder	CD 2069	1989
Steady Rock	Rounder	CD 2092	1989
Your Mama Don't Know	Rounder	CD 2107	1991
Follow Me Chicken	Rounder	CD 2122	1993
Creole Crossroads (featuring Michael Doucet)	Rounder	CD 2137	1995
I'm A Zydeco Hog: Live at the Rock 'N' Bowl, New Orleans	Rounder	CD 2143	1997
Let's Go!	Rounder	11661-2159-2	2000
Hang It High, Hang It Low	Rounder	11661-2164-2	2006
Live at the 2011 New Orleans Jazz & Heritage Festival	MunckMix	<unknown>	2011
Live at the 2012 New Orleans Jazz & Heritage Festival	MunckMix	<unknown>	2012
Live at the 2013 New Orleans Jazz & Heritage Festival	MunckMix	<unknown>	2013
A New Road	Cha Cha Records	CCR-0005	2013
Lucky Man	Cha Cha Records		2022
Like Father, Like Son (Live at Rock 'N' Bowl de Lafayette)	Cha Cha Records		2022

=== Singles ===
Song title(s)	Album title	Record label	Stock number	Release year	Note(s)
"If You Got A Problem" / "Tonight's The Night" (performed by Sara Dow)	Steady Rock / <unknown>	Maison de Soul	45-1054	1989?	7", 45 RPM
"I Got The Zydeco Blues (Down in My Shoes)" / "Everybody Calls Me Crazy (But My Name Is Nathan Williams)"	<unknown>	El Sid O's Records	ES-100	1987	7", 45 RPM
"Bye Bye My Little Moma" / "Louisiana Waltz"	<unknown>	El Sid O's Records	ES-101	1987	7", 45 RPM

=== Various artist compilation albums ===
Album title	Record label	Stock number	Release year	Song title(s)
101 Proof Zydeco	Maison de Soul	MDS 1030	1990	"If You Got a Problem"
Mardi Gras Party	Rounder	CD-11567	1991	"Mardi Gras Zydeco"
Alligator Stomp: Cajun & Zydeco Classics, Vol. 3	Rhino	R2 70312	1992	"El Sid O's Zydeco Boogaloo"
Cajun Music and Zydeco	Rounder	CD 11572	1992	"Slow Horses and Fast Women"
Stomp Down Zydeco	Rounder	CD 11566	1992	"You're My Mule"
Stomp Down Zydeco	Rounder	CD 11566	1992	"Everything on the Hog"
Zydeco Party	K-Tel International	60592	1992	"Your Mama Don't Know"
The Best of Louisiana Music	Rounder	CD AN 08	1993	"Your Mama Don't Know"
Alligator Stomp: Cajun & Zydeco, The Next Generation, Vol. 5	Rhino	R2 71846	1995	"Zydeco Road"
Louisiana Spice: 25 Years of Louisiana Music on Rounder Records	Rounder	CD AN 18/19	1995	"Outside People"
More Cajun Music and Zydeco	Rounder	CD 11573	1995	"Follow Me, Chicken"
The Real Music Box: 25 Years of Rounder Records	Rounder	CD AN 25	1995	"Outside People"
The Rounder Christmas Album: Must Be Santa!	Rounder	3118	1995	"I Don't Want You Just for Christmas"
The Royal Family of Zydeco	Rock 'n Bowl (Rounder Records)	CD 1001	1995	"Your Mama Don't Know"
The Royal Family of Zydeco	Rock 'n Bowl (Rounder Records)	CD 1001	1995	"Follow Me Chicken"
The Royal Family of Zydeco	Rock 'n Bowl (Rounder Records)	CD 1001	1995	"Zydeco Road"
Bayou Dance Party	Rounder	CD 7014	1996	"Outside People"
The Real Louisiana	EasyDisc	ED 9002	1996	"Slow Horses and Fast Women"
Zydeco's Greatest Hits	EasyDisc	ED CD 7025	1996	"Your Mama Don't Know"
Zydeco's Greatest Hits	EasyDisc	ED CD 7025	1996	"Follow Me Chicken"
Bayou Beat	EasyDisc	EDCD 7053	1997	"El Sid O's Zydeco Boogaloo"
Hey Mardi Gras!	EasyDisc	7015	1997	"Mardi Gras Zydeco"
Mardi Gras Party Time!	K-Tel International	3680	1997	"Zydeco Road"
Southern Gumbo: The Best of New Orleans R&B, Soul and Zydeco on Rounder Records	Rounder (UK release)	BR1	1997	"Hey Yie Yie" (feat. Michael Doucet)
Cajun & Zydeco Festival	EasyDisc	ED CD 7067	1998	"Zydeco Road"
Rough Guide to Cajun and Zydeco	World Music Network (UK)	RGNET 1028 CD	1998	"Slow Horses and Fast Women"
Zydeco Barnyard	EasyDisc	367070	1998	"Everything on the Hog"
Zydeco Barnyard	EasyDisc	367070	1998	"You're My Mule"
Zydeco Barnyard	EasyDisc	367070	1998	"Zydeco Hog"
Zydeco Fever!	Nascente (UK)	NSCD 029	1998	"Black Gal"
Zydeco Party	EasyDisc	ED CD 7045	1998	"Festival Zydeco"
Zydeco Stomp: All Instrumental	Rounder	ED CD 7065	1998	"El Sid O's Zydeco Boogaloo"
Allons en Louisiane	Rounder	11161-60993-2	1999	"Hey Bébé"
Cajun Heat Zydeco Beat	EasyDisc	367077	1999	"Zydeco Hog"
Discover the Rhythms of Cajun/Zydeco	Drum	8568272	2000	"Alligator"
Louisiana Music Sampler	Putumayo World Music	PUT932-5	2000	"I'm in Love"
Music from the Zydeco Kingdom	Rounder Select	11579	2000	"Everything on the Hog"
Putumayo Presents Zydeco	Putumayo World Music	PUTU 160-2	2000	"I'm in Love"
Cajun & Zydeco: Alligator Walk	ARC Music	EUCD 1657	2001	"Everybody Got To Cry"
The Louisiana Party Collection: 30 Cajun & Zydeco Classics	Time-Life Music	R154-36	2002	"Your Mama Don't Know"
The Rough Guide to the Music of Louisiana	World Music Network (UK)	RGNET 1094 CD	2002	"Black Snake Blues / I Can't Go Home No More" (feat. Michael Doucet)
Zydeco: The Essential Collection	Rounder	1166-11605-2	2002	"Let's Go"
Zydeco: The Essential Collection	Rounder	1166-11605-2	2002	"Outside People"
The Louisiana Party Collection: Cajun & Zydeco Classics	Time-Life Music	M18851S	2003	"Your Mama Don't Know"
The Rough Guides: American Roots Box	World Music Network	RGBOX 3	2003	"Slow Horses and Fast Women"
Creole Bred: A Tribute to Creole & Zydeco	Vanguard	79741-2	2004	"Zydeco Two-Step"
Creole Bred: A Tribute to Creole & Zydeco	Vanguard	79741-2	2004	"I'm Coming Home" (with Keith Frank, Rosie Ledet, and Sean Ardoin)
Rough Guide to Zydeco	World Music Network (UK)	RGNET 1145 CD	2005	"Hard To Love Someone"
Experience Louisiana Music 2006	OffBeat Magazine	OB06-11001	2006	"Old Man's Darling"
Red Hot: Louisiana Barbeque Party Mix	Somerset Entertainment	35637	2006	"Let's Go"
Red Hot: Louisiana Barbeque Party Mix	Somerset Entertainment	35637	2006	"Zydeco Road"
Red Hot: Louisiana Barbeque Party Mix	Somerset Entertainment	35637	2006	"El Sid O's Party"
Red Hot: Louisiana Barbeque Party Mix	Somerset Entertainment	35637	2006	"Your Mama Don't Know"
Red Hot: Louisiana Barbeque Party Mix	Somerset Entertainment	35637	2006	"Slow Horses and Fast Women"
Red Hot: Louisiana Barbeque Party Mix	Somerset Entertainment	35637	2006	"Outside People"
Red Hot: Louisiana Barbeque Party Mix	Somerset Entertainment	35637	2006	"Everything Happens For the Best"
Red Hot: Louisiana Barbeque Party Mix	Somerset Entertainment	35637	2006	"Fa Fa Fa Fa Fa"
Red Hot: Louisiana Barbeque Party Mix	Somerset Entertainment	35637	2006	"Mardi Gras Zydeco"
Red Hot: Louisiana Barbeque Party Mix	Somerset Entertainment	35637	2006	"El Sid O's Zydeco Boogaloo"
Songlines: Top of the World 38	Songlines (UK)	STWD14	2006	"Zydeco Cha Cha"
TFF Rudolstadt 2007	Heideck (Germany)	HD20075	2007	"Tante Rosa"
Rounder Records 40th Anniversary Concert	Rounder	11661-3277-2	2010	"Outside People"
Rounder Records 40th Anniversary Concert	Rounder	11661-3277-2	2010	"Think About the Good Times"
The Music of Louisiana: The Oxford American Southern Music Issue No. 14	Oxford American	<unknown>	2012	"Old Man's Darling"
Blues Christmas	Putumayo World Music	PUT 379-2	2019	"I Don't Want You Just For Christmas"
The Heart, The Soul, The Spirit	Larrikin Entertainment (Australia)	<unknown>	<unknown>	"Follow Me Chicken"

== Filmography ==
- 1994: The Kingdom of Zydeco (documentary, directed by Robert Mugge), includes commentary and a performance by Williams
- 2009: In the Electric Mist (feature film directed by Bertrand Tavernier), cameo appearance
- 2010: Rounder Records 40th Anniversary Concert, aired on PBS, includes a performance by Nathan & the Zydeco Cha Chas

== Awards and honors ==
- 2002: Best of the Beat Award for Best Zydeco Band or Performer
- 2005: inducted into the Louisiana Music Hall of Fame
- 2006: Best of the Beat Award for Best Zydeco Band or Performer
- 2006: Best of the Beat Award, Best Zydeco Album for Hang it High, Hang it Low
- 2010: Big Easy Music Award for Best Zydeco Band
- 2012: Big Easy Music Award for Best Zydeco Band
- 2012: Zydeco Music Association Lifetime Achievement Award
- 2015: Zydeco, Blues and Trailride (ZBT) Clifton Chenier Lifetime Achievement Award
- 2017: Landry Vineyards in West Monroe, Louisiana unveiled their "Nathan Williams Zydeco Wine" label in honor of the musician who performed at the venue for many years
- 2023: Grammy Award nomination in the Best Regional Roots Music Album category, for Lucky Man
- unknown year: voted top festival band in the country
