= Girl Authority (album) =

Studio album by Girl Authority
- Released: April 4, 2006
- Recorded: October – December 2005
- Genre: Rock, pop, children's music, teen pop
- Label: Zoë Records
- Producer: Samantha Hammel, Scott Billington

Girl Authority chronology
Girl Authority (2006)	Road Trip (2007)

Girl Authority is the debut cover album by pop girl group Girl Authority. The album is a cover album of previous hit songs by other female solo singers and girl groups, with the exception of two songs, originally recorded by Smokey Robinson & the Miracles and ABBA. The album peaked at No. 167 on the Billboard 200 albums chart, No. 9 on the Billboard Top Kid Audio chart (a chart that records sales of children's music albums)and No. 5 on their Top Heatseekers chart.

== Track listing ==
1. "Hollaback Girl" – 3:21 (Hugo, Stefani, Williams) (Gwen Stefani)
2. "Hit Me with Your Best Shot" – 2:58 (Schwartz) (Pat Benatar)
3. "Material Girl" – 3:51 (Brown, Rans) (Madonna)
4. "Pon de Replay" – 3:39 (Brooks, Nobles, Rogers, Sturken)
5. "Beautiful" (Perry)
6. "Don't Worry 'Bout a Thing" – 3:34 (Deere, Osborn)
7. "Dancing Queen" – 3:36 (Andersson, Anderson, Ulvaeus)
8. "Get the Party Started" – 3:11 (Perry) (Pink)
9. "Shop Around" – 3:18 (Gordy, Robinson)
10. "I Love Rock N' Roll" – 2:53 (Mamburg, Sachs) (Joan Jett)
11. "Karma" – 4:16 - (Augello, Brothers, Cook, Smith)
12. "Girls Just Want to Have Fun" – 3:35 (Hazard) (Cyndi Lauper)
13. "Leave (Get Out)" – 4:03 (Cantrall, Kenneth, Schack, White) (Jojo)
14. "Breakaway" (Benenate, Gerrard, Lavigne)
15. "We Got the Beat" – 2:32 (Caffey) (The Go-Go's)

== Critical response ==
Marisa Brown of AllMusic called the album "too much too bear", criticizing "the fact that many of the songs are thematically inappropriate for kids" and "the semi-talented yet extremely puerile interpretations, with the intermittent giggling and nasally tag-team-like vocals".
