= Best Kept Secret (Chris Ardoin album) =

Studio album by Chris Ardoin
- Released: 2000
- Studio: Ultrasonic
- Genre: Zydeco
- Label: Rounder
- Producer: Scott Billington

Chris Ardoin chronology
Turn the Page (1998)	Best Kept Secret (2000)	Life (2003)

Best Kept Secret is an album by the American musician Chris Ardoin, released in 2000. He is credited with his band, Double Clutchin'. Ardoin supported the album with a North American tour.

== Production ==
Recorded at Ultrasonic Studios, in New Orleans, the album was produced by Scott Billington. Sean Ardoin left the band prior to the recording sessions. Chris Ardoin played rhythm and lead guitar, accordion, rubboard, and bass. Ardoin wrote most of the album's songs. "Papa Was a Rollin' Stone" is a version of the song made famous by the Temptations. "If It Makes You Happy" is a cover of the Sheryl Crow song. "I Don't Want Nobody Here but You" was written by John Delafose.

== Critical reception ==
Professional ratings
Review scores
Source	Rating
The Age	4/4 stars
AllMusic	4/5 stars
Orlando Sentinel	5/5 stars
The Penguin Guide to Blues Recordings	3.5/4 stars

OffBeat wrote that, "track after track, the accordion whiz kid puts on the show, pumping out endless sequences of innovative and improvised riffs—flying up and down the scales while hammering out barrages of squealy high notes along the way." The Orlando Sentinel determined that "Ardoin and rhythm guitarist Nat Fontenot lock their guitar parts as tightly as a couple of funk players who've been gigging together for decades." Billboard said that "Ardoin's accordion is propulsive and imaginative; he attacks the rhythm line like a jazz soloist, but he never loses the zydeco groove."

The Boston Globe noted that "unexpected pop salutes (a bit of George Michaels here, Bobby McFerrin there) play into the rhythmic jams." Bass Player praised Curley Chapman's "tight, punchy tone and unfailing groove." Keyboard stated that the "hybrid mixture blends the traditional elements of Cajun, zydeco, and Creole with contemporary elements." The Herald-Sun listed Best Kept Secret among the best albums of 2000.

== Track listing ==
No.	Title	Length
1.	"Holdin' On"
2.	"Papa Was a Rollin' Stone"
3.	"What You Got Down There? Part 2"
4.	"Best Kept Secret"
5.	"Hold That Tiger"
6.	"What's in That Bayou?"
7.	"Lyin' Cryin' and Tryin'"
8.	"If It Makes You Happy / It Just Ain't Right"
9.	"I Don't Want Nobody Here but You"
10.	"Storm Don't Last Long"
11.	"Get Gone"
12.	"Chris's Trail Ride"

== Personnel ==
- Guitar: Chris Ardoin, Nat Fontenot
- Bass: Curley Chapman
- Washboard: Chris Ardoin, Curley Chapman
- Accordion: Chris Ardoin
- Drums: Dexter Ardoin
- Backing Vocals: Charles Elam III
