= Let's Go! (album) =

Studio album by Nathan Williams
- Released: 2000
- Recorded: June – July 1999
- Genre: Zydeco, R&B
- Label: Rounder
- Producer: Scott Billington

Nathan Williams chronology
I'm a Zydeco Hog: Live at the Rock 'n' Bowl, New Orleans (1997)	Let's Go! (2000)	Hang It High, Hang It Low (2006)

Let's Go! is an album by the American musician Nathan Williams, released in 2000. He is credited with his band, the Zydeco Cha Chas. They supported it with a North American tour.

== Production ==
Produced by Scott Billington, the album was recorded in June and July 1999. All of its songs were written or cowritten by the band, with "Can't Get Nuthin', Sucka" cowritten by David Egan. Williams wrote a few slower songs, as he wanted to avoid the perception of zydeco as simply party music. Some of the songs were inspired by stories that Williams's brother Sid told him. Williams continued to play a piano accordion. "Zydeco Rumble" was used in promotional spots for Louisiana tourism.

== Critical reception ==
Professional ratings
Review scores
Source	Rating
All Music Guide to the Blues	4/5 stars
Courier News	3/4 stars
The Penguin Guide to Blues Recordings	3/4 stars
The Press of Atlantic City	3/4 stars

The Boston Globe stated that "Williams pushes the simple, R&B-inflected music into near pop perfection by placing strong melodies over the classic syncopated rhythms." The Washington Post said, "His fondness for southern blues and soul music, as well as his appetite for the kind of southwest Louisiana cuisine he celebrates on 'Le Bon Manger', inspires some of his best songwriting and prevents the album from turning into just another squeeze box, chant-filled marathon." The Courier News praised the "rich, raucous R&B-by-the-bayou".

== Track listing ==
No.	Title	Length
1.	"Let's Go!"
2.	"Too Much Wine"
3.	"Put a Hump in Your Back"
4.	"Zydeco Rumble"
5.	"Everything Happens for the Best"
6.	"Hard Times"
7.	"Zydeco Is All I Know"
8.	"Cricket Leg Zydeco"
9.	"Can't Get Nuthin', Sucka"
10.	"El Sid O's Party"
11.	"You Don't Love Me No More"
12.	"Stay Out All Night"
13.	"Oh Mom"
14.	"Le Bon Manger"
