= Follow Me Chicken =

Studio album by Nathan Williams
- Released: 1993
- Genre: Zydeco
- Label: Rounder
- Producer: Scott Billington

Nathan Williams chronology
Your Mama Don't Know (1991)	Follow Me Chicken (1993)	Creole Crossroads (1995)

Follow Me Chicken is an album by the American musician Nathan Williams, released in 1993. He is credited with his band, the Zydeco Cha Chas.

== Production ==
The album was produced by Scott Billington. Williams was influenced by the musical style of Clifton Chenier as well as music of the Caribbean. Kenyatta Simon played djembe. "I Need Someone to Love Me" is a cover of the Z.Z. Hill song. "Elle Est Jolie (Isn't She Lovely)" is a cover of the Stevie Wonder song.

== Critical reception ==
Professional ratings
Review scores
Source	Rating
AllMusic	4.5/5 stars
Los Angeles Times	3/4 stars
MusicHound World: The Essential Album Guide	4/5 stars
Orlando Sentinel	4/5 stars
The Penguin Guide to Blues Recordings	4/4 stars

The Washington Post wrote: "Yet for all his myriad influences, Williams clearly appreciates the value of a fundamental zydeco groove, the churning, ceaselessly syncopated beat that makes 'Hey Manan', 'Zydeco Is Alright' and 'Zydeco Road' so rhythmically contagious." The Orlando Sentinel determined that the Cha Chas "emphasize the R&B elements of zydeco with nifty horn charts, hints of New Orleans funk and Williams' versatile accordion playing."

The Los Angeles Times noted that "the combination of Williams' skilled accordion and Allen Broussard's alto sax gives the music a broader melodic range than many zydeco groups have." The Press-Enterprise concluded that Williams blends "boogie, soul, country and blues, all spiked with the rhythms of Acadia, into an astonishing dance music... This is folk music—but it's advancing forward as folk music always must to remain powerful." The Miami New Times stated that, "like the best New Orleans music, the Zydeco Cha Chas combine multicultural ingredients to create a fresh stew."

AllMusic wrote that a "high point of the risk-taking album is 'Mama's Tired', which combines zydeco with both ska and '60s-type soul."

== Track listing ==
No.	Title	Length
1.	"Follow Me Chicken"
2.	"Mama's Tired"
3.	"Hey Maman"
4.	"Elle Est Jolie (Isn't She Lovely)"
5.	"Zydeco Road"
6.	"I'm in Love"
7.	"One Track Mind"
8.	"Ma Pauvre Maman"
9.	"Tout Partout Mon Passe"
10.	"Zydeco Is Alright"
11.	"Don't Make a Fool Out of Me"
12.	"I Need Someone to Love Me"
