= Filé (band) =

American cajun music ensemble

- Genres: Cajun music
- Years active: 1983–present
- Labels: Flying Fish Records
- Members: Ward Lormand, Kevin Shearin, Peter Stevens, D'Jalma Garnier, David Egan, Al Berard, Darren Wallace, Brian Langlinais
- Past members: Michael Shinkman

Filé is a cajun music ensemble from Louisiana founded in 1983. The group is named after filé powder, a spice used in cajun food.

The group was founded by Ward Lormand and Kevin Shearin, who had previously played together in the band Cush-Cush from 1980. Peter Stevens joined the group for their debut in 1985, while D'Jalma Garnier and David Egan joined in the early 1990s.

== Members ==
Current

- Ward Lormand – accordion, percussion, vocals
- Kevin Shearin – bass, guitar, vocals
- Peter Stevens – percussion
- D'Jalma Garnier – fiddle
- David Egan – keyboards
- Al Berard - Guitar
- Darren Wallace - Fiddle
- Brian Langlinais - Guitar

Former

- Michael Shinkman - Trombone

== Discography ==
- Live at Mulate's (1985)
- Cajun Dance Band (Flying Fish Records, 1987)
- Two Left Feet (Flying Fish, 1990)
- La Vie Marron (Green Linnet Records, 1996)
- Hang On to Your Chapeau (2000)
