= Rock n' Bowl =

Music venue in New Orleans, Louisiana

Rock'n'Bowl
- Mid City Lanes
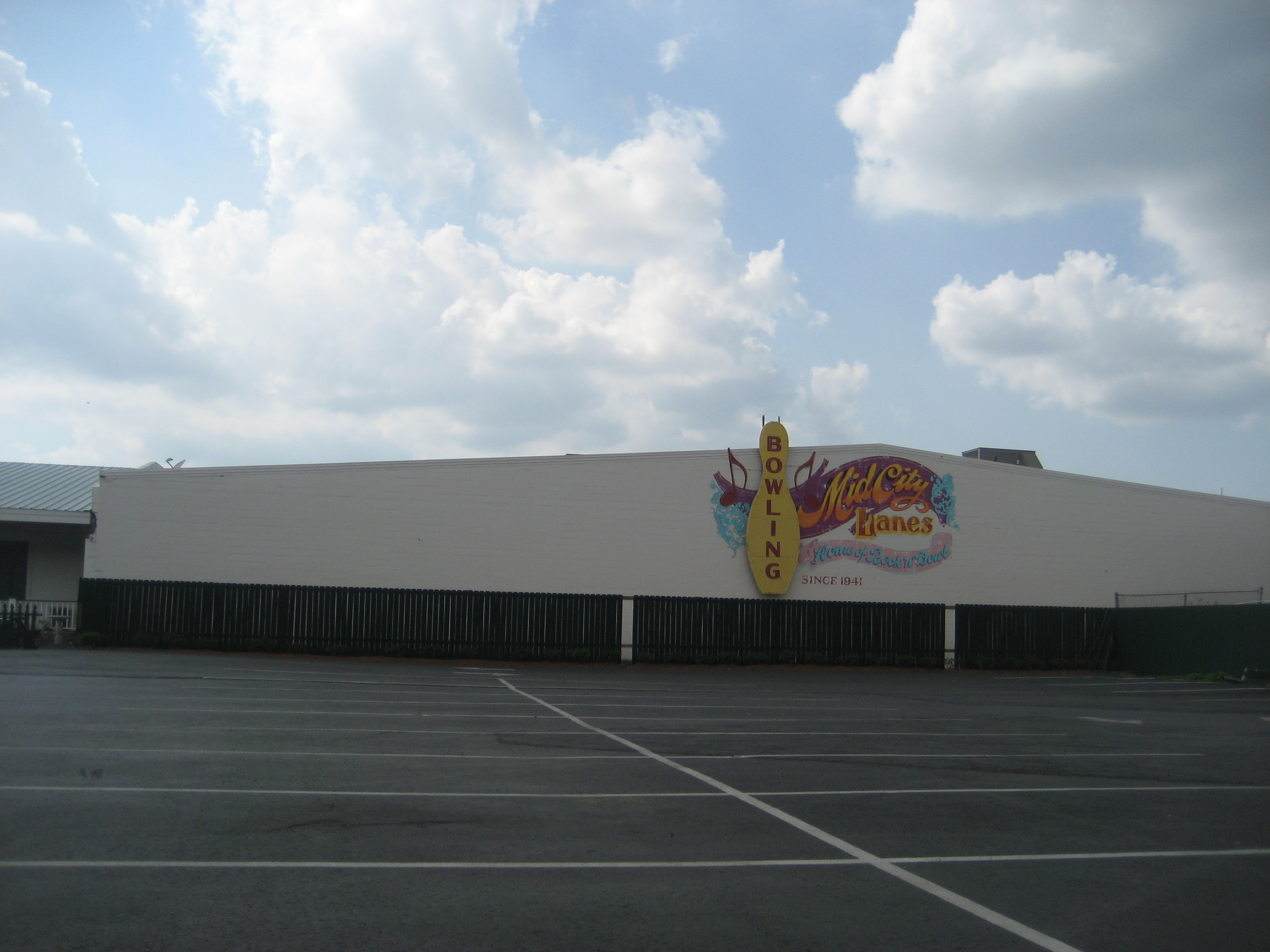
- The exterior of the new Rock'n'Bowl® opened in 2009
- Interactive map of Rock'n'Bowl
- Former names: Mid-City Lanes, Mid-City Rock n' Bowl
- Location: 3000 S. Carrollton Ave., New Orleans, Louisiana (formerly 4133 S. Carrollton, 1989–2009)
- Coordinates: 29°57′40.5″N 90°6′57.5″W
- Owner: John Blancher
- Seating type: dance floor
- Type: Nightclub, Bowling alley
- Events: R&B, Zydeco, Cajun, Rock, Blues, Jazz

Construction
- Built: 1941 (original location)
- Opened: 1989 (original location)
- Renovated: 2009 (new location)
- Expanded: 1996 ("Bowl Me Under" at original location)

Website
- RocknBowl.com

Rock'n'Bowl is a live music venue located on S. Carrollton Avenue in New Orleans. It is a unique venue that combines a bowling alley and a music club together in one place. The club features various live music of local musicians, and is also famous for booking many zydeco acts. The past performers include Beau Jocque, Boozoo Chavis, Geno Delafose, Chris Ardoin, Snooks Eaglin, Wild Magnolias, and Anders Osborne.

== History ==
In 1941 the bowling alley opened on the upstairs floor of a small commercial mall building in Mid-City New Orleans under the name of "Mid City Lanes." John Blancher, the current owner, purchased it in 1988 and a year later turned it into a live music venue, while keeping the bowling alley active. The first live music at the venue was performed on November 2, 1989, by Johnny J and the Hitmen. Following the change, the place became known as the Rock 'n' Bowl, however, the original name "Mid City Lanes" has also been in use, and was still often found under that name alphabetically in music listings.

In the mid-1990s, Rock 'n' Bowl® expanded to the ground floor of the same building creating another bar and stage for live shows underneath the bowling alley, called "Bowl Me Under".

In August 2005, the ground floor suffered severe flood damage due to Hurricane Katrina, but the second floor, with the bowling alley and main music stage, survived. The club re-opened by December 2005, one of the first business back open in Mid City New Orleans. Mid City Lanes Rock 'n' Bowl remained open during reconstruction of the building. As of May, 2008, the ground floor has been gutted, and a brand new facade has been constructed, with one anchor tenant at the Tulane Avenue corner; The neon sign was in place, but the other artwork had been painted over and not reapplied.

In 2009, Rock 'n' Bowl® moved to a new location about 12 blocks riverwards from the old venue on South Carrollton Avenue. The building faces Earhart Boulevard, with the parking lot facing Carrollton Avenue, with a sign similar to the former one at the old location. The new venue officially opened on April 15.

Murals of historic New Orleans scenes by artist Tony Green were dismantled and moved to the new location. The "Mid-City" in the former name "Mid-City Rock 'n' Bowl" was dropped in deference to local neighborhood associations, since the new location is no longer within the boundaries of Mid-City.

== See also ==
- List of music venues
