= Painted On =

Studio album by The Fabulous Thunderbirds
- Released: 14 June 2005
- Genre: Blues rock, Texas blues
- Label: Rykodisc, Tone-Cool, Artemis
- Producer: Steve Berlin

The Fabulous Thunderbirds chronology
Live (2001)	Painted On (2005)

Professional ratings
Review scores
Source	Rating
Allmusic	4/5 stars
The Penguin Guide to Blues Recordings	3/4 stars

Painted On is a 2005 studio album by Texas based blues rock band The Fabulous Thunderbirds. It was produced by Steve Berlin of Los Lobos and features Rachel Nagy of The Detroit Cobras.

== Track listing ==
1. "Hard Knock" (4:11)
2. "Got to Get Out" (3:21)
3. "Two-Time Fool" (2:43)
4. "Love Speaks Louder Than Words" (3:00)
5. "Painted On" (4:12)
6. "Feeling My Way Around" (3:35)
7. "Rock Candy" (3:27)
8. "Only Daddy That'll Walk the Line" (2:19)
9. "Postman" (5:21)
10. "Wild Cherry" (4:25)
11. "You Torture Me" (3:35)
12. "When I Am Gone" (6:55)
