= High Water (The Fabulous Thunderbirds album) =

Studio album by The Fabulous Thunderbirds
- Released: 12 August 1997
- Genre: Blues rock, Texas blues
- Label: High Street/Windham Hill
- Producer: Steve Jordan, Danny Kortchmar

The Fabulous Thunderbirds chronology
Different Tacos (1996)	High Water (1997)	Live (2001)

Professional ratings
Review scores
Source	Rating
AllMusic	2/5 stars
The Penguin Guide to Blues Recordings	3.5/4 stars

High Water is a 1997 studio album credited to Texas-based blues rock band The Fabulous Thunderbirds, though the album is a collaboration between Thunderbirds frontman Kim Wilson and studio musicians (and producers) Steve Jordan and Danny Kortchmar. Wilson, Kortchmar and Jordan are the only musicians to appear on the album.

== Track listing ==
1. "Too Much of Everything" (Wilson, Kortchmar, Jordan)
2. "Do Right by Me" (Jordan, Wilson)
3. "Tortured" (Wilson, Kortchmar)
4. "High Water" (Wilson, Jordan, Kortchmar)
5. "Hurt on Me" (Jordan, Wilson)
6. "Hand to Mouth" (Wilson, Kortchmar)
7. "Promises You Can't Keep" (Wilson, Kortchmar, Jordan)
8. "I Can't Have You" (Wilson, Jordan)
9. "Too Hot to Handle" (Kortchmar, Wilson)
10. "Save It For Someone Who Cares" (Wilson, Jordan)
11. "It's About Time" (Wilson, Jordan)
12. "That's All I Need to Know" (Jordan, Wilson)

== Personnel ==
- Kim Wilson - vocals, guitar, harp
- Steve Jordan - drums, guitar, bass guitar, background vocals (except on 6)
- Danny Kortchmar - guitar, organ, piano, programming, background vocals (except on 5)
