= Girl Authority =

American cover pop girl group

- Origin: Sudbury, Massachusetts
- Genres: Pop; children's music
- Years active: 2005–2010
- Labels: Zoë; Rounder
- Past members: Jacqueline Laviolette; Carly Grayson; Jessica "Jess" Bonner; Crystal Evans; Kate Barker; Zoë Virant; Jessica Tarr; Gina Miele; Alexandra "Alex" Bilbo
- Website: twitter.com/girlauthority

Girl Authority was an American cover pop girl group. The group consisted of nine girls, at the time, ranging in ages 8 to 13; Jacqueline Laviolette, Carly Grayson, Jessica "Jess" Bonner, Crystal Evans, Kate Barker, Zoë Virant, Jessica Tarr, Gina Miele and Alexandra "Alex" Bilbo. The group was established in the summer of 2005 by the group's vocal coach/executive producer Samantha Hammel, Scott Billington (a Grammy award-winning producer) and the CEO of Rounder Records, John Virant, the father of Zoë, one of the members of Girl Authority. Based on the oldest girls graduating high school; in the summer of 2010, the girls contracts with Rounder Records ceased, and the band officially retired. Currently, the majority of the group members are attending or just graduating college. All of these girls are still close friends and get together for reunions.

All of the girls participated in local musical theater together for five years before joining the group. Each member of the group had a persona during their time in the group; Laviolette was All-Star Girl, Grayson was Glamour Girl, Bonner was Boho Girl, Evans was Country Girl, Barker was Party Girl, Virant was Preppy Girl, Tarr was Rock N' Roll Girl, Miele was Urban Girl, and Bilbo was Fashion Girl.

Girl Authority's self-titled album was released on the Zoë Records label in April 2006. The album reached #9 on Billboard's Top Kid Audio chart and #17 on the Top Heatseekers chart. On the album, the girls recorded past songs such as Madonna's Material Girl and Kelly Clarkson's Breakaway. The album ran several TV advertisements on Nickelodeon. In April 2006, the girls were invited to sing with The Dresden Dolls at a show in Boston. The girls have also shared the stage with the Jonas Brothers and Jesse McCartney, and have appeared on CBS' The Early Show.

Their second album, Road Trip, was released on March 13, 2007. Featured on this album is a version of the early previously unreleased Depeche Mode song called "Let's Get Together" that Vince Clarke re-wrote for the band. 80s pop singer Cyndi Lauper wrote a ballad titled "Shine" that the group covered, and Tanya Donelly wrote four tracks for the album, including "This Is My Day". In addition, three remaining original songs on the album include "Rhythm of the World" by Ch!pz, "Wild Side" (a song sung by Jessica Tarr), and their theme song "Girl Authority". The group also recorded and released an EP titled Halloween Party Songs, a cover recording of Halloween-themed songs. However, the EP was only sold in iParty stores. Three years after Halloween Party Songs was released Girl Authority broke up in 2010.

== Awards ==
- Best Audio—iParenting Media

== Side projects ==
Girl Authority recorded "The Star-Spangled Banner" in June 2006 and also a theme song for the Club Libby Lu store chain. They also released a Christmas single titled "Santa Claus Is Comin' to Town". The single is only sold to listeners on Rhapsody, URGE, Zune and iTunes. They also made a guest appearance in the book series Beacon Street Girls in July. The group held a songwriting contest for Beacon Street Girls readers. The group chose the song "I Am Me", a song written by a fourteen-year-old girl named Allison Boudreau from Swansea, Massachusetts. The song was then available as a free download on the Beacon Street Girls website. The group had also considered three other songs before choosing the winning song: Marissa from Ontario, Canada and her song "To Be the One to Find Me", Charlotte from Saskatchewan, Canada with her song, "My Friends Bring Out the Best in Me" and Brook from Illinois with her song, "We're Going Outside Tonight".

== Discography ==
=== Albums ===
- Girl Authority (2006)
- Road Trip (2007)

=== EPs ===
- Halloween Party Songs (2007)

=== Singles ===
- "Santa Claus Is Comin' to Town" (2006)
- "Let's Get Together" (2007)
- "I Am Me" (2008)
