= La Vie Marron =

Studio album by Filé
- Released: 1996
- Genre: Cajun
- Label: Green Linnet

Filé chronology
Two Left Feed (1990)	La Vie Marron (1996)	Hang On to Your Chapeau (2000)

La Vie Marron (The Runaway Life) is an album by the American band Filé, released in 1996. The band promoted the album with a North American tour. The album was a hit on Americana radio formats.

== Production ==
Filé wrote five of the album's 11 songs. "Bonsoir Moreau" is a cover of the Canray Fontenot song. C. C. Adcock played guitar on La Vie Marron; Dave Egan joined the band on piano. The liner notes were written by Barry Jean Ancelet.

== Critical reception ==
Professional ratings
Review scores
Source	Rating
AllMusic	4/5 stars
MusicHound World: The Essential Album Guide	3/5 stars

The Gazette noted that "the old-time waltzes and two-steps are still there, but so are demon rock `n' roll, sweat-soaked blues and sweet Dixieland." The Chicago Tribune wrote that the band "blends authentic Cajun wailing and Fats Domino-style rock 'n' roll into an intriguing hybrid that's as potent a listen as it is a dance-floor stimulant." The Washington Post determined that "on Egan's composition, 'I Just Can't Do [It] Right', his Professor Longhair piano licks provide a strong New Orleans flavor, but [Ward] Lormand's squeezebox and D'Jalma Garnier's fiddle pull it back into the swamps."

The Blade stated: "Loping two-steps mix with bluesy zydeco as a singing fiddle and a smokin' accordion take their turns with some danceable waltzes, vintage melodies, and raucous originals." Nashville Scene listed the album among the 20 best of 1996, deeming it "a rollicking album of dance tunes that blend R&B, rock, and all things Louisiane." The Columbus Dispatch called La Vie Marron "nothing short of brilliant."

AllMusic wrote that the band "puts a unique twist on the music with the addition of piano to the traditional mix of instruments and their own refreshing style, without losing any of the integrity of the Cajun tradition."

== Track listing ==
No.	Title	Length
1.	"La Vie Marron"
2.	"One Foot in the Bayou"
3.	"Lucille"
4.	"Bonsoir Moreau"
5.	"I Just Can't Do It Right"
6.	"Sandy Cove"
7.	"Fido Dixieland"
8.	"Talle d'Éronces"
9.	"Chéroquis/Midland"
10.	"Loup Garou Mange pas Mes Enfants"
11.	"Boogaloo"

== Personnel ==
- Guitar: C.C. Adcock
- Fiddle, guitar, banjo, vocals – D'Jalma Garnier
- Piano, vocals: David Egan
- Bass: Kevin Shearin
- Drums: Peter Stevens
- Accordion, frottoir, triangle, vocals: Ward Lormand
- Vocals: The Ossun Sympathy Choir
