= Live (The Fabulous Thunderbirds album) =

Live album by The Fabulous Thunderbirds
- Released: May 2001
- Recorded: February 16, 2000
- Genre: Blues rock, Texas blues
- Label: CMC International, Sanctuary
- Producer: Ed Cherney

The Fabulous Thunderbirds chronology
High Water (1997)	Live (2001)	Painted On (2005)

Professional ratings
Review scores
Source	Rating
The Penguin Guide to Blues Recordings	3/4 stars

Live is a 2001 live album by Texas-based blues rock band The Fabulous Thunderbirds. Recorded on the evening of February 16, 2000, the concert made history somewhat for becoming the first ever to be broadcast over the internet using high-definition cameras. It was also released on DVD titled Invitation Only. Some versions of the album are titled This Night in L.A..

== Track listing ==
1. "Introduction" (Dave Adleson) - 0:07
2. "Wait On Time" (Kim Wilson) - 4:12
3. "My Babe" (Ron Holden) - 5:47
4. "The Things I Used To Do" (Eddie Jones) - 5:46
5. "The Hustle Is On" (H. Eddy Owens) - 3:27
6. "I Can Tell" (Samuel Smith) - 4:02
7. "Look Whatcha Done' (Sam Magnett) - 4:46
8. "Wrap It Up" (Isaac Hayes, David Porter) - 3:01
9. "Early Every Morning" (B.B. King, Joe Josea) - 5:37
10. "She's Tough" (Jerry McCain) - 4:54
11. "I Believe I'm In Love" (Wilson) - 3:35
12. "Tuff Enuff" (Wilson) - 5:41
13. "People Will Be People" (David Egan) - 4:15
14. "Where Were You" (Smiley Lewis) - 5:37

== Personnel ==
- Kim Wilson - lead vocals, harmonica
- Kid Ramos - guitar
- Willie J. Campbell - bass
- Stephen Hodges - drums
- Gene Taylor - piano
- David K. Mathews - organ
- Lee Thornberg - trumpet
- Jeff Turmes, Steven Marsh - saxophones
- Mindy Stein, Valerie Pinkston - backing vocals
