= Beau Jocque =

American zydeco musician (1953–1999)

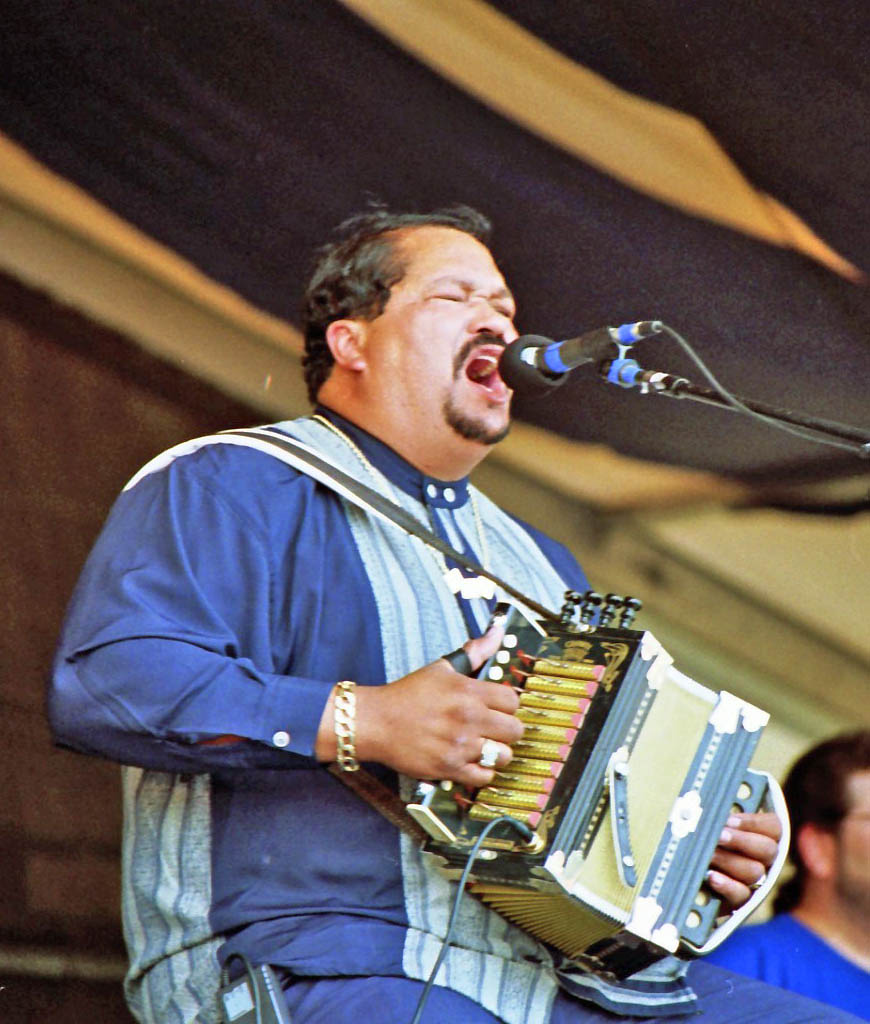
- Beau Jocque at the New Orleans Jazz Fest, 1997

Background information
- Born: Andrus Espre; November 1, 1953; Duralde, Evangeline Parish, Louisiana, U.S.
- Died: September 10, 1999 (aged 45) Kinder, Louisiana, U.S.
- Genres: Zydeco
- Instruments: Accordion, vocals
- Years active: 1991–1999
- Labels: Rounder; Mardi Gras Records

Beau Jocque (born Andrus Espre; November 1, 1953 – September 10, 1999) was a Louisiana French Creole zydeco musician and songwriter active in the 1990s.

Beau Jocque is known for his gruff vocals, his fusion of many musical styles into zydeco, and above all, for the powerful energy of his rhythm and sound. Backed by the Hi-Rollers, he became one of the top dance-hall acts of his musical decade. He wrote, recorded and performed many songs in both Louisiana French and Louisiana Creole languages, as well as in English, primarily on the Rounder Records label.

== Early life ==
Beau Jocque was born Andrus Espre in Duralde, Louisiana, to Sandrus and Vernice (née Allen) Espre. His father (nicknamed "Tee Toe") was a well-respected accordion player who performed at many local dances, but who quit playing music when Andrus' older brother was born. Andrus played guitar in a high school band but his influences were not zydeco musicians but rather acts such as War, ZZ Top, Stevie Ray Vaughan, James Brown, Sly and the Family Stone, and Santana.

He enlisted in the Air Force after high school, and eventually made it to the rank of sergeant, had a top security clearance and was stationed in London and Germany. He once escorted Henry Kissinger around Europe. Espre had his first near-death experience while in the Air Force, when an explosion left him in the hospital with amnesia. He spent nine years in the military, then came home to work as an electrician and welder. He was a long time resident of Kinder, Louisiana. He was also known to write poetry, and preach about respecting nature.

== Career ==
Working in an oil refinery after leaving the Air Force, Espre experienced a work-related accident on September 4, 1987, which left him temporarily paralyzed from the waist down. During his recuperation, as part of his therapy he began playing his father's button accordion. After a year of practice and gaining proficiency on the accordion, Espre and his wife Michelle (AKA Shelly) began to study the styles of the successful groups on the zydeco circuit. "We checked out C. J. Chenier, Buckwheat Zydeco, Boozoo Chavis, John Delafose and I'd watch the crowd. When they got real excited, I'd try to feel what was happening at that point. Was it the rhythm guitar? The drums? The accordion style? I realized that when you get the whole thing just right, it's going to move the crowd."

Espre grew up speaking Louisiana Creole French and spoke it fluently. As he was physically a large man at 6 ft 6 in (198 cm) tall and 270 pounds (120 kg), he took the stage name "Beau Jocque," which was a childhood nickname in Louisiana Creole meaning "Big Guy." In 1991, he put a band together, including his wife Shelly on rubboard. They initially talked themselves into a few gigs in small clubs or for trail ride parties, and word spread quickly about a new zydeco artist. He especially appealed to a younger crowd by incorporating rock guitar solos, blues-rock beats, and rap lines into his songs, along with his bass vocals and growling lyrics. His initial recording got airplay on local radio stations and the larger zydeco clubs began to take notice. Within a short amount of time, Beau Jocque was playing clubs four to five nights a week and just a few years after his accident, Espre was one of the biggest draws on the Louisiana zydeco circuit. In June 1995 one newspaper stated that "There has simply never been a zydeco phenomenon like Beau Jocque and the Hi-Rollers" who have "thoroughly modernized zydeco". His major zydeco influence was Boozoo Chavis who also played the button accordion, with hypnotic riffs and two-step stomps that were favorites with south Louisiana dancers.

In 1995 Beau Jocque and the Zydeco Hi-Rollers were the headliners on the Rounder Records "Louisiana Red Hot Music Tour". In June 1999 they were a featured band at the first annual New Jersey Arts and Music Festival.

Beau Jocque and the Zydeco Hi-Rollers won the Big Easy Music Awards three times as Best Zydeco Artist.

=== Recordings ===
Beau Jocque's first recording was a 1992 vanity release titled My Name is Beau Jocque (Lanor Records 1031), which was re-issued in 1994 by Paula Records. Espre sent cassettes of this release to area radio stations and also sold them at his gigs. He had to re-order more copies because they sold very quickly.

Scott Billington, a producer for Rounder Records who was familiar with the Louisiana zydeco scene, picked up on the buzz surrounding Beau Jocque and signed him to his label. Beau Jocque Boogie was released in 1993, and it contained the song that became his first hit and signature song, "Give Him Cornbread". The song, written by Espre, includes elements of Willis Prudhomme's zydeco arrangement of "Shortnin' Bread" and FM's hip hop song "Gimme What You Got (For a Porkchop)". Audiences demanded that the band play that song multiple times at dances, and as the song gained popularity, fans would throw pieces of cornbread onto the stage. Beau Jocque Boogie became the highest-selling zydeco album ever.

Beau Jocque recorded five studio albums for Rounder, with a sixth live album titled Give Him Cornbread, Live released on the label posthumously in 2000. The label also issued two posthumous compilation albums. All were financial successes for both the label and the artist. His contract with Rounder was not exclusive, so Beau Jocque also recorded two albums for New Orleans–based Mardi Gras Records as well as a mini-CD on his own label.

=== Rivalry with Boozoo Chavis ===
Beau Jocque's rapid rise to the top of the zydeco circuit created some tension with the older musicians, who felt he hadn't paid his dues. Zydeco pioneer Boozoo Chavis even recorded a song called "Boozoo's Payback" that included the lyrics "He plays my music and he does me wrong, but he can't sing my song", directed at Beau Jocque.

But the rivalry was also good for business. The Mid-City Lanes Rock n' Bowl in New Orleans staged annual mock battles billed as "Boo vs. Beau" during the New Orleans Jazz & Heritage Festival, which each year drew more than 1,000 patrons and set attendance records at the venue. One year, Mick Jagger and Charlie Watts of The Rolling Stones paid the $5 admission charge to experience the showdown. One such "battle of the bands" was the centerpiece of a 1994 documentary film The Kingdom of Zydeco by director Robert Mugge.

It was a friendly rivalry. The two musicians often traded insults in public but they were supportive of each other in private. Beau Jocque often played Chavis' songs during his performances, and even performed at a benefit concert to raise money to pay the costs of surgery for Chavis' wife. In the 1994 film, both musicians admitted that the battle of the bands was a promotional gimmick.

The final "Boo vs. Beau" battle in New Orleans was held on May 2, 1999, at the Rock n' Bowl.

== Personal life ==
Espre and his wife Michelle ("Shelly") had two sons, Andrus Adrian and Justin Travis.

In 1995, Espre suffered a heart attack in Austin, Texas, while touring with Marcia Ball and Steve Riley and the Mamou Playboys. Radio stations in Louisiana had reported the 1995 heart attack was fatal, and he surprised his fans (including the town's mayor) by shortly thereafter appearing in the local supermarket in Kinder.

== Death ==
On September 9, 1999, Beau Jocque and the Zydeco Hi-Rollers performed a two-set show at the Rock n' Bowl in New Orleans, and afterwards drove the approximately 200 miles on Interstate 10 back to Kinder. The next morning, Beau Jocque was found collapsed in the shower by his wife, dead of an apparent heart attack at the height of his career. He is buried in Saint Matilda Cemetery, Eunice, Louisiana.

Espre's death was preceded only two weeks earlier by the death of his father, Sandrus.

== Hi-Rollers personnel ==
Members of the Hi-Rollers include:

- Chuck Bush (bass)
- Steve Charlot (drums)
- Russell "Sly" Dorion (guitar)
- Ray Johnson (guitar)
- Mike Lockett (keyboard)
- Wilfred Pierre (rubboard)

== Discography ==
=== Studio and live albums ===
Album title	Record label	Stock number	Release year
Beau Jocque Boogie	Rounder	CD 2120	1993
Pick Up on This!	Rounder	CD 2129	1994
My Name is Beau Jocque	Paula Records	PCD-1031	1994
Nursery Rhyme	Beau Jocques Music	1001	1995
Git It, Beau Jocque!	Rounder	CD 2134	1995
Gonna Take You Downtown	Rounder	CD 2150	1996
Check It Out, Lock It In, Crank It Up!	Rounder	11661-2158-2	1998
Zydeco Giant	Mardi Gras Records	MG 1043	1999
I'm Coming Home	Mardi Gras	1046	2000
Give Him Cornbread, Live!	Rounder	11661-2160-2	2000

=== Singles and EPs ===
Song title(s)	Album title	Record label	Stock number	Release year	Note(s)
"Pop That Coochie" / "My Name Is Beau Jocque"	My Name Is Beau Jocque	Paula Records	461	<unknown>	7", 45 RPM
"Don't Sell That Monkey" / "Maria" (performed by Roy Carrier)	<unknown>	Paula	P-463	<unknown>	7", 45 RPM
"Make It Stank (Special Aromatic Dance Mix)" / "Make It Stank (Special Aromatic Dance Mix with Spoken Intro)"	Gonna Take You Downtown	Rounder	PR 1077	<unknown>	12", 33 1/3 RPM, Promotional single

=== Various artist compilation albums ===
Album title	Record label	Stock number	Release year	Song title(s)
Feet: A Global Dance Party	Ellipsis Arts	CD 1010	1993 (reissued in 2004)	"Give Him Cornbread"
Roundup The Unusual Suspects: The Roundup Records CD Sampler, Summer 1994	Rounder	RUP-1	1994	"Don't Tell Your Mama, Don't Tell Your Papa"
WWOZ on CD	Friends of WWOZ	<unknown>	1994	"Beau's Mardi Gras"
Alligator Stomp: Cajun & Zydeco, The Next Generation, Vol. 5	Rhino	R2 71846	1995	"Give Him Cornbread"
The Lanor Records Story, 1960-1992	Zane Records (UK)	ZNCD 1009	1995	"My Name Is Beau Jocque"
Louisiana Spice: 25 Years of Louisiana Music on Rounder Records	Rounder	CD AN 18/19	1995	"Give Him Cornbread"
The Real Music Box: 25 Years of Rounder Records	Rounder	CD AN 25	1995	"Give Him Cornbread"
The Royal Family of Zydeco	Rock 'n Bowl (Rounder Records)	CD 1001	1995	"Give Him Cornbread"
The Royal Family of Zydeco	Rock 'n Bowl (Rounder Records)	CD 1001	1995	"Brownskin Woman"
The Royal Family of Zydeco	Rock 'n Bowl (Rounder Records)	CD 1001	1995	"Beau Jocque Boogie"
Young Zydeco Desperadoes: Black Creole Sounds of Today	Trikont (Germany)	US - 0204	1995	"Give Him Cornbread"
Young Zydeco Desperadoes: Black Creole Sounds of Today	Trikont (Germany)	US - 0204	1995	"Ma Brunette"
Young Zydeco Desperadoes: Black Creole Sounds of Today	Trikont (Germany)	US - 0204	1995	"Beau Jocque Shuffle"
All Over The Map	Rounder	CD AN 26	1996	"Nonc Adam"
Bayou Dance Party	EasyDisc	ED CD 7014	1996	"Richard's Club"
Planet Music Sampler: Vol. 7 Louisiana Fest	Planet Music	<unknown>	1996	"Git It, Beau Jocque"
The Real Louisiana	EasyDisc	ED 9002	1996	"Nonc Adam"
Roll Up The Rug: Triple Swing Time, volume 2	Living Traditions Music	<unknown>	1996	<unknown>
The Very Best of Cajun	Dino Entertainment (UK)	DINCD 127	1996	"My Name Is Beau Jocque"
Zydeco's Greatest Hits	EasyDisc	ED CD 7025	1996	"Give Him Cornbread"
Bayou Beat	EasyDisc	EDCD 7053	1997	"Beau's Cajun Two Step"
CMJ New Music Monthly, Volume 41 January 1997	College Music Journal	<unknown>	1997	"Gonna Take You Down"
Discover the Rhythms of Cajun/Zydeco	EMI	LC0542	1997	"Brownskin Woman"
Hey Mardi Gras!	EasyDisc	ED CD 7015	1997	"Beau's Mardi Gras"
Rounder Essentials: A Baker's Dozen	Rounder	CD 9902	1997	"Give Him Cornbread"
Southern Gumbo: The Best of New Orleans R&B, Soul and Zydeco on Rounder Records	Rounder (German release)	BR1	1997	"Make It Stank"
Zydeco Dance Hall	EasyDisc	ED CD 7035	1997	"Git It, Beau Jocque!"
Zydeco Dance Hall	EasyDisc	ED CD 7035	1997	"Couché Dehors Ce Soir"
Cajun & Zydeco Festival	EasyDisc	ED CD 7067	1998	"A Little Love Always Make it Bettah"
Crescent City Songbook	Rounder	VS-1	1998	"Gonna Take You Downtown"
Mardi Gras Time	EasyDisc	CD 9004	1998	"Mardi Gras Blues"
Zydeco Barnyard	EasyDisc	12136-7070-2	1998	"Shaggy Dog 2-Step"
Zydeco Fever!: A Sizzling Hot Louisiana Combo of Cajun and R&B	Nascente (UK)	NSCD 029	1998	"Make It Stank (Aromatic Dance Mix)"
Zydeco Fever!: A Sizzling Hot Louisiana Combo of Cajun and R&B	Nascente (UK)	NSCD 029	1998	"Baby Please Don't Go"
Zydeco Fever!: A Sizzling Hot Louisiana Combo of Cajun and R&B	Nascente (UK)	NSCD 029	1998	"Knockin' On Heaven's Door"
Zydeco Party	EasyDisc	ED CD 7045	1998	"Comin' In"
Zydeco Stomp: All Instrumental	Rounder	ED CD 7065	1998	"Kinder 2-Step"
Allons en Louisiane	Rounder	11161-60993-2	1999	"Going To The Country"
Cajun & Zydeco Jamboree	EasyDisc	ED 12136-7076-2	1999	"Just One Kiss"
Cajun Heat Zydeco Beat	EasyDisc	ED 1213670772	1999	<unknown>
Gaga for Ya-Ya: Zydeco Madness	Winter & Winter (Germany)	910 041-2	1999	"Tequila"
Gaga for Ya-Ya: Zydeco Madness	Winter & Winter (Germany)	910 041-2	1999	"Come Go With Me"
Let's Party, It's Mardi Gras!	Mardi Gras Records	JS 1305	1999	"The Second Line/The Back Door"
The Oxford American Southern Sampler: 1999	Oxford American	<unknown>	1999	"Don't Tell Your Mama, Don't Tell Your Papa"
WWOZ on CD: Roll Wid It!	Friends of WWOZ	<unknown>	1999	"Get It Beau Jocque"
Zydeco Essentials	Hip-O Records	767 440161 2	1999	"Low Rider"
Absolutely The Best Of Cajun & Zydeco, vol. II	Fuel 2000; Varèse Sarabande	302 061 114 2	2000	"Ma Brunette"
Putumayo Presents Zydeco	Putumayo World Music	PUTU 160-2	2000	"What You Gonna Do?"
Super Mardi Gras	Mardi Gras Records	MG1045	2000	"The Second Line/The Back Door"
Authentic Zydeco Music: From Southwest Louisiana	Jose Suescun Music Distribution	JS 1318	2001	"My Name Is Beau Jocque"
Authentic Zydeco Music: From Southwest Louisiana	Jose Suescun Music Distribution	JS 1318	2001	"When You Think About Me"
Authentic Zydeco Music: From Southwest Louisiana	Jose Suescun Music Distribution	JS 1318	2001	"Grand Marais Two-Step"
Authentic Zydeco Music: From Southwest Louisiana	Jose Suescun Music Distribution	JS 1318	2001	"Beau Jocque Two-Step"
Mardi Gras in New Orleans	Rounder	1166-11600-2	2001	"Beau's Mardi Gras"
Roots Music: An American Journey	Rounder	11661-0501-2	2001	"Just One Kiss"
Ultimate Zydeco	Mardi Gras Records	MG 1056	2001	"Pine Point Trail Ride"
Ultimate Zydeco	Mardi Gras Records	MG 1056	2001	"No Good Woman"
Au Revoir	Mambito Records	MR003	2002	<unknown>
Louisiana: The Rough Guide to the Music of Louisiana	World Music Network (UK)	RGNET 1094 CD	2002	"Mardi Gras Blues"
Louisiana Legends Collection	Mambito	MR004	2002	"I'm A Lonely Boy"
The Louisiana Party Collection: Cajun & Zydeco Classics	Time-Life Music	M18851	2002	"Give Him Cornbread"
The Louisiana Party Collection: 30 Cajun & Zydeco Classics	Time-Life Music	R154-36	2002	"Give Him Cornbread"
Zydecajun Instrumentals	Mambito	MR001	2002	<unknown>
Zydeco: The Essential Collection	Rounder	1166-11605-2	2002	"I'm On The Wonder"
Zydeco: The Essential Collection	Rounder	1166-11605-2	2002	"Give Him Cornbread"
American Routes with Nick Spitzer: Carnival	Public Radio International	AR 03-09	2003	"Mardi Gras Blues"
Boozoo Hoodoo!: The Songs of Boozoo Chavis	Fuel 2000	302 061 278-2	2003	"Boogie Woogie All Night"
Doctors, Professors, Kings & Queens: The Big Ol' Box of New Orleans	Shout! Factory	D4K 37441	2004	"Give Him Cornbread"
Best of Louisiana Music!	Mardi Gras Records	MG 5102	2005	"Morning Train"
Rough Guide to Zydeco	World Music Network (UK)	RGNET 1145 CD	2005	"Boogie Chillun"
Down South Party Mix	Mardi Gras Records	MG 1092	2006	"I'm A Girl Watcher"
New Orleans: Rebuild, Restore, Rejoice	Mardi Gras Records	MG 5104	2006	"I'm A Girl Watcher"
Rough Guide to Zydeco: Allons Danser! Creole Accordions Dance	World Music Network (UK)	RGNET 1145 CD	2006	<unknown>
Putumayo World Party	Putumayo World Music	PUTU 263-2	2007	"Just One Kiss"
The Essential Guide to Cajun Music	Play It Again Sam	6891316025	2008	"Baby Please Don't Go"
The Essential Guide to Cajun Music	Play It Again Sam	6891316025	2008	"Give Him Cornbread"
Absolutely The Best Of Cajun & Zydeco, vol. 3	Fuel 2000	302 061 778 2	2009	"Boogie Woogie All Nite Long"
The Rounder Records Story	Rounder	11661-3295-2	2010	"Give Him Cornbread"
The Heart, The Soul, The Spirit	Larrikin Entertainment (Australia)	<unknown>	<unknown>	"Give Him Cornbread"

== Filmography ==
- Louisiana Blues (directed by Jean-Pierre Bruneau, 1993); Beau Jocque appears as himself in a film history of Cajun and Zydeco music.
- The Kingdom of Zydeco (directed by Robert Mugge, 1994); Beau Jocque and Boozoo Chavis appear in this documentary which features their friendly rivalry while both were seeking to earn the title "King of Zydeco" following the deaths of Clifton Chenier and Rockin' Dopsie.
- By the River of Babylon: An Elegy for South Louisiana (TV documentary directed by Don Howard and Jim Shelton, 2015); includes music performances by Beau Jocque and Clifton Chenier.

=== Other media appearances ===
- Late Night with Conan O'Brien: June 26, 1995, episode 2.188
- Late Show with David Letterman: May 15, 1998; Beau Jocque & The Zydeco Hi-Rollers appeared on a special New Orleans episode

== Awards ==
- 1994: Big Easy Music Awards, Best Zydeco Artist
- 1994: Beau Jocque and the Zydeco Hi-Rollers were voted Hottest Band at the inaugural Zydeco People's Choice Awards. Additionally, band member Classie Ballou was named as Best Bass Guitarist at the same awards ceremony.
- 1995: Big Easy Music Awards, Best Zydeco Artist
- 1995: Beau Jocque's composition "Yesterday" (from his Pick Up On This! album) won the Best Song of the Year award at the Second Annual Zydeco People's Choice Awards. Hi-Rollers bandmate Ray Johnson also received the award for Best Lead Guitar Player.
- 2000: Big Easy Music Awards, Best Zydeco Artist
