= Gwil Owen =

- Born: Gwilym Emyr Owen III; July 24, 1960 (age 66); Syracuse, New York, U.S.
- Genres: Alternative country Rock music Folk music
- Occupation: Singer-songwriter
- Years active: 1980s–present
- Label: Rambler Records
- Website: GwilOwen.com

Gwilym "Gwil" Emyr Owen III (born July 24, 1960) is an American singer-songwriter of Welsh heritage.

== Career ==
Gwil was born in Syracuse, New York, grew up in Granville, Ohio, and attended Antioch College in Yellow Springs, Ohio, but did not graduate. He moved to Boston in 1981 and played in the formerly Spartanburg, South Carolina-based band The Detonators along with long-time musical partner Jeff Finlin. They moved to Nashville in 1983 and formed the band The Thieves, which recorded the album Seduced by Money for Bug/Capitol Records in 1988.

Since then, he has performed as a solo singer-songwriter, and his songs have been covered by Toni Price, Irma Thomas, Little Feat, and Jack Ingram, among others. The song "Deuce and a Quarter" (co-written with Kevin Gordon) was recorded by Keith Richards and Levon Helm for the album All The Kings Men. He was an Academy Award nominee in 1999 for the song "A Soft Place to Fall" (co-written with Allison Moorer) featured in Robert Redford's movie The Horse Whisperer.

Gwil was also a co-founder of Howlin' Books in Nashville and is a noted visual collage artist.

== Discography ==
=== Gwil Owen ===
- 1991: Phoenix (Rambler Records, Cassette)
- 1991: Messed Up Thing b/w Tennessee Hi-Way Blues (Diesel Only Records, 7" single)
- 1992: Near-Sighted Angel (Rambler Records, Cassette)
- 1993: Hot Black Coffee b/w Too Much Coffee (Diesel Only Records, 7" single)
- 1993: The Last Man on the Moon (Rambler Records, Cassette)
- 1999: Magnetic Heaven (Earnest Whitney Entertainment)
- 2008: Gravy (Rambler Records)
- 2010: Ahab's Birthday (Rambler Records)
- 2016: Tiny Birds (Rambler Records, EP)
- 2019: Flying Dream (Rambler Records)
- 2022: The Road to the Sky (Rambler Records)

=== Appearances on compilation albums ===
- 1992: Nighttime Roundup (Taxim Records) - track 13, "My Silver Tongue," track 14, "Ask Any Mirror"
- 1992: Rig Rock Juke Box: A Collection of Diesel Only Records (Diesel Only Records) - track 9, "Messed Up Thing"
- 1993: Rig Rock Truck Stop: Another Collection of Diesel Only Records (Diesel Only Records) - track 3, Hot Black Coffee," track 14, "Too Much Coffee"
- 1995: Hell-Bent: Insurgent Country Volume 2 (Bloodshot Records) - track 10, "Tennessee Hi-Way Blues"
- 1996: Nashville: The Other Side of the Alley: Insurgent Country Volume 3 (Bloodshot Records) - track 17, "No Ammunition"
- 1998: Uprooted: The Best of Roots Country Singer-Songwriters (Shanachie Records) - track 11, "Mother Nature & Father Time"
- 2001: Hit the Hay, Vol. 5 (Sound Asleep Records) - track 25, "Eleanor"
- 2005: Between Goodlettsville and Murfreesboro (Sound Asleep Records) - track 12, "Look What You've Done"

=== The Thieves ===
- 1988: Seduced by Money (Bug C1-91153)
- 2021: Catfish Karma: The Lost Demos 1987-88 (Rambler Records)

=== As composer/lyricist ===
- 1993: Toni Price – Swim Away (Antone's/Discovery) – track 1, "Daylight"; track 2, "Throw Me a Bone" (co-written with Eric Elliot); track 7, "Moonlight Blues"; track 8, "I Doubt If It Does to You"; track 10, "Hell on Love"; track 11, "Thinkin' 'Bout Lovin' You Again"; track 12, "Lucky"; track 13, "Swim Away"
- 1994: Tim Carroll – ‘’Tim Carroll’’ (self-released, cassette), track B2, “Like a Number” (co-written with Tim Carroll)
- 1995: Toni Price – Hey (Antone's) – track 2, "Something" (co-written with Eric Elliot); track 3, "Hey"; track 4 "Edge of the Night"; track 5, "Misty Moonlight"; track 6, "Too Close to You"; track 9, "Tumbleweed"; track 13, "Too Much Coffee"
- 1996: Sonny Burgess – Sonny Burgess (Rounder) – track 9, "Fast Train" (co-written with Kevin Gordon), track 11, "Lookin' Out for Number One"
- 1996: Kelly Clark and the Wild River Band - Rapid Transit (self-released) - track 2, "Something" (co-written with Eric Elliott)
- 1997: Bob Woodruff – Desire Road (Curb) – track 9, "Perfect World" (co-written with Bob Woodruff)
- 1997: David Olney - Real Lies (Philo) - track 10, "Death, True Love, Lonesome Blues and Me"
- 1997: Stacey Q – Boomerang (Eno Records) – track 4, "I Doubt if it Does to You"
- 1997: Toni Price – Sol Power (Antone's) – track 3, "Cats and Dogs", track 4, "Like the Sun"; track 5, "Freeway"; track 6, "#1"; track 7, "Burnin' Down"; track 10, "What's It Take?"; track 13, "A West Texas Lullaby"
- 1997: Joy Lynn White – ‘’The Lucky Few’’ (Little Dog Records) – track 4, “I Doubt if it Does to You”
- 1997: Scotty Moore, Keith Richards, Levon Helm – All the King's Men (Sweetfish) – track 1, "Deuce and a Quarter" (co-written with Kevin Gordon)
- 1997: Kevin Gordon – ‘’Illinois 5 AM’’ (self-released) - track 2, "Blue Collar Dollar" (co-written with Kevin Gordon), track 3, "Dissatisfied" (co-written with Kevin Gordon), track 7, "Illinois 5 a.m." (co-written with Kevin Gordon)
- 1997 Joy Lynn White – ‘’4 on the Floor’’ (SRI) – track 11, “Two Can Play” (co-written with Joy Lynn White)
- 1998: Allison Moorer – “Various Artists: Soundtrack from The Horse Whisperer’’ (MCA) – track 2, “A Soft Place to Fall” (co-written with Allison Moorer)
- 1998: Allison Moorer – Alabama Song (MCA Nashville) – track 9, "A Soft Place to Fall" (co-written with Allison Moorer)
- 1998: Kevin Gordon – Cadillac Jack's No. 1 Son (Shanachie Records) – track 2, "Fast Train" (co-written with Kevin Gordon); track 5, "Blue Collar Dollar" (co-written with Kevin Gordon); track 6, "Dissatisfied" (co-written with Kevin Gordon); track 8, "Looking for the Killerman" (co-written with Kevin Gordon)
- 1998: Troy Young Campbell - Man vs. Beast (self-released) - track 5, "A Little More Everyday" (co-written with Troy Young Campbell)
- 1999: David Olney – Through a Glass Darkly (Philo) – track 9, "Ice Cold Water" (co-written with David Olney); track 12, "That's All I Need to Know" (co-written with David Olney)
- 1999: Sarah Elizabeth Campbell and The Banned - Live (self-released) - track 2, "Bluesville" (co-written with Sarah Elizabeth Campbell), track 3, "The Rain Song" (co-written with Sarah Elizabeth Campbell)
- 1999: Toni Price – Low Down And Up (Antone's) – track 5, "Anything" (co-written with David Olney, uncredited); track 7, "Loserville Blues"; track 8, "Feel Like Cryin'"; track 9, "Lonesome Wind"
- 1999: John Sieger - El Supremo (Faux Real Records) - track 1, "Just Gettin' By" (uncredited, co-written with John Sieger)
- 2000: Ann Rabson – Struttin' My Stuff (M.C. Records) – track 2, "The Blues Don't Care" (co-written with David Olney); track 12, "Late November Afternoon" (co-written with Ann Rabson and David Olney)
- 2000: David Olney – Omar's Blues (Dead Reckoning) – track 3, "Delta Blue" (co-written with David Olney)
- 2000: Kevin Gordon – Down to the Well (Shanachie Records) – track 2, "Burning the Church House Down" (co-written with Kevin Gordon); track 3, "Marina Takes Her Aim" (co-written with Kevin Gordon); track 6, "Deuce and a Quarter" (co-written with Kevin Gordon); track 9, "Great Southern" (co-written with Kevin Gordon); track 10, "Pueblo Dog" (co-written with Kevin Gordon)
- 2000: Will Kimbrough – This (Waxysilver) – track 10, "Goodnight Moon" (co-written with Will Kimbrough)
- 2001: Duane Jarvis – Certified Miracle (Slewfoot) – track 2, "Certified Miracle" (co-written with Duane Jarvis)
- 2001: Steve Allen – In + Out of the Light (Babalink) – track 7, "Crazy World" (co-written with Steve Allen)
- 2001: Toni Price – Midnight Pumpkin (Lone Star) – track 4, "Something in the Water"; track 8, "Measure for Measure" (co-written with David Olney)
- 2001: Yolanda Martinez – Lonely Warrior (Legends Alive) – track 10, "A Soft Place to Fall" (co-written with Allison Moorer)
- 2002: Jack Ingram – Electric (Lucky Dog / Epic) – track 11, "Goodnight Moon" (co-written with Will Kimbrough)
- 2002: Joy Lynn White - On Her Own - (self-released) - track 1, "Sunday" (co-written with Joy Lynn White), track 8, "An Exception" (co-written with Joy Lynn White)
- 2002: Hayseed - In Other Words (self-released) - track 3, "98.6 Degrees" (co-written with Eric Elliott)
- 2002: Richard Ferreira - Somewhereville (Miranda) - track 2, "One Step Closer" (co-written with Richard Ferreira), track 7, "House of Rain" (co-written with Richard Ferreira)
- 2002: Will Kimbrough - Home Away (Daphne) - track 3, "Champion of the World (co-written with Will Kimbrough)
- 2002: Pinmonkey – Speak No Evil (BMG Music) – track 4, "Augusta"
- 2002: Micah Chasteen - Swagger (self-released) - track 4, "Something" (co-written with Eric Elliott)
- 2002: Toni Catlin – Heartache on the Run (Western Beat) – track 3, "Me and My Heartache on the Run" (co-written with Toni Catlin)
- 2002: Brown Mountain Lights - Late Show at the Cave (Bombay) - track 4, "Tumbleweed"
- 2003: Jack Ingram - Acoustic Motel (RAM Records) - track 15, "Goodnight Moon" (co-written with Will Kimbrough)
- 2003: Kevin Bowe and the Okemah Prophets – ‘’Angels on the Freeway’’ – (Corazong Records), track 8, “Soon Enough” (co-written with Kevin Bowe)
- 2003: Allison Moorer – Show (Universal South) – track 4, "A Soft Place to Fall" (co-written with Allison Moorer)
- 2003: David Olney – The Wheel (Loud House) – track 3, "Voices on the Water" (co-written with David Olney)
- 2003: Toni Price – Born to Be Blue (Antone's/Texas Music) – track 7, "Nothing But Heartache"; track 11, "Not Coming Home"; track 13, "One of These Lonely Days"
- 2005: David Olney – ‘’Migration’’ (Loud House Records) – track 7, “All the Same to Me” (co-written with David Olney)
- 2005: Kevin Gordon - O Come Look at the Burning (Crowville Collective) - track 1, "Watching the Sun Go Down" (co-written with Kevin Gordon), track 2, "Find My Way" (co-written with Kevin Gordon), track 3, "Greenwood Girls" (co-written with Kevin Gordon), track 4, "Casino Road" (co-written with Kevin Gordon), track 9, "Flowers" (co-written with Kevin Gordon), track 12, "Heart's Not In It" (co-written with Kevin Gordon)
- 2006: Irma Thomas - After the Rain (Rounder) - track 2, "Flowers" (co-written with Kevin Gordon)
- 2006: 10 City Run - Somethin' Else (Universal) - track 7, "Goodnight Moon" (co-written with Will Kimbrough)
- 2006: Jack Ingram - Live: Wherever You Are (Big Machine Records) - track 12, "Goodnight Moon" (co-written with Will Kimbrough)
- 2006: Will Kimbrough - Americanitis (Daphne) - track 8, "Another Train" (co-written with Will Kimbrough)
- 2006: Rob LaMothe – ‘’Long Lazy Curve’’ (Live Wire Records), track 5, “Til Forever is Over” (co-written with Rob LaMothe)
- 2006: Stephen Fearing – ‘’Yellowjacket’’ (self-released) – track 11, “Goodnight Moon” (co-written with Will Kimbrough)
- 2007: Kevin Gordon – “Louisiana Snow” (Crowville Collective, 7” single), co-written with Kevin Gordon
- 2007: Toni Price - Talk Memphis (Antone's Records) - track 2, "What I'm Puttin' Down" (co-written with Richard Ferreira), track 6, "Gravy" (co-written with Richard Ferreira), track 7, "Sunflower", track 13, "The Power" (co-written with Richard Ferreira)
- 2008: Little Feat featuring Jimmy Buffett - Join the Band - track 5, "Champion of the World" (co-written with Will Kimbrough)
- 2008: David Olney – ‘’Live at Norm’s River Roadhouse’’ (Deadbeet) – track 5, “Panama City” (co-written with David Olney)
- 2009: Charlotte Park Rangers – ‘’Charlotte Park Rangers’’ (self-released) – track 3, “I Want to Get Lost” (co-written with Richard Ferreira)
- 2009: Debra Watson & the Smokin' Aces - That's Right! (self-released) - track 7, "Throw Me a Bone" (co-written with Eric Elliott)
- 2009: Kevin Gordon - Salvage & Drift #1 - track 2, "Find My Way" (co-written with Kevin Gordon), track 3, "Illinois 5 A.M." (co-written with Kevin Gordon), track 5, "Casino Road" (co-written with Kevin Gordon), track 10, "Looking for the Light" (co-written with Kevin Gordon)
- 2010: Toni Price - Cherry Sunday Orchestra (Self-released) - track 11, "Do You Take Me for a Fool?"
- 2010: David Olney – ‘’Dutchman’s Curve’’ – (Deadbeet) – track 1, “Train Wreck” (co-written with David Olney)
- 2010: Kevin Gordon - Gloryland (Crowville) - track 2, "Don't Stop Me This Time" (co-written with Kevin Gordon), track 9, "Side of the Road" (co-written with Kevin Gordon), track 11, "One I Love" (co-written with Kevin Gordon)
- 2010: Eden Brent – ‘’Ain’t Got No Troubles’’ (Yellow Dog Records) – track 12, “Goodnight Moon” (co-written with Will Kimbrough)
- 2011: David Olney – ‘’Film Noir’’ (Deadbeet Records) - track 2, “Blue Moon Hotel” (co-written with David Olney), track 4, “The Blues Don’t Care” (co-written with David Olney
- 2013: Hard Working Americans – ‘’Hard Working Americans’’ (Thirty Tigers) - track 2, “Another Train” (co-written with Will Kimbrough)
- 2013: Danni Nicholls – ‘’A Little Redemption’’ (self-released) – track 10, “Goodnight Moon” (co-written with Will Kimbrough)
- 2014: Hard Working Americans – ‘’The First Waltz’’ (Thirty Tigers) - track 2, “Another Train” (co-written with Will Kimbrough)
- 2014: David Olney – ‘’When the Deal Goes Down’’ (Deadbeet) – track 7, “Why So Blue?” (co-written with David Olney)
- 2015: Solitaire Miles – ‘’Susie Blue and the Lonesome Fellas’’ (self-released) - track 3, “The Blue Lonelies” (co-written with David Olney)
- 2015: Kevin Gordon – ‘’Long Gone Time’’ (Crowville) – track 7, “All in the Mystery” (co-written with Kevin Gordon and Colin Linden)
- 2015: Kevin Gordon – ‘’Live at Family Wash 10-30-15’’ (Crowville, digital only) – track 1, “Illinois 5 a.m.” (co-written with Kevin Gordon), track 3, “Burning the Church House Down” (co-written with Kevin Gordon), track 6, “All in the Mystery” (co-written with Kevin Gordon & Colin Linden)
- 2016: William Clark Green – ‘’Live at Gruene Hall’’ (Bill Grease Records) – track 21, “Goodnight Moon” (co-written with Will Kimbrough)
- 2016: Jack Ingram - Midnight Motel (Rounder) - track 9, "Champion of the World" (uncredited, co-written with Will Kimbrough)
- 2017: David Olney – ‘’Don’t Try to Fight It’’ (Red Parlor) – track 2, “Innocent Heart” (co-written with David Olney and Richard Ferreira)
- 2018: Kevin Gordon - Tilt and Shine (Crowville) - track 5, "Right on Time" (co-written with Kevin Gordon), track 9, "Get it Together" (co-written with Kevin Gordon)
- 2018: Shemekia Copeland - America's Child (Alligator Records) - track 10, "One I Love" (co-written with Kevin Gordon)
- 2018: The Dirty Rain Revelers – ‘’Spark’’ (self-released) - track 10, “Something” (co-written with Eric Elliott)
- 2019: Amelia White – ‘’Rhythm of the Rain’’ (self-released) – track 12, “Pink Cloud” (co-written with Amelia White)
- 2020: Kevin Gordon – ‘’Down to the Well: Solo Demos Unearthed’’ – (Crowville, digital only), track 2, “Burning the Church House Down (co-written with Kevin Gordon), track 3, “Marina Takes Her Aim” (co-written with Kevin Gordon), track 5, “Deuce and a Quarter” (co-written with Kevin Gordon), track 8, “Great Southern” (co-written with Kevin Gordon), track 9, “Pueblo Dog” (co-written with Kevin Gordon)
- 2022: Julie Christensen - 11 From Kevin: Songs of Kevin Gordon (Wirebird Records) - track 1, "Find My Way" (co-written with Kevin Gordon), track 6, "Heart's Not In It" (co-written with Kevin Gordon)
- 2022: David Olney – ‘’Evermore’’ (Strictly Country) – track 2, “Train Wreck” (co-written with David Olney)
- 2022: David Olney – ‘’Nevermore’’ (Strictly Country) – track 2, “Ice Cold Water” (co-written with David Olney), track 4, “Innocent Heart” (co-written with David Olney and Richard Ferreira)
