= Turn the Page (Chris Ardoin album) =

Studio album by Chris Ardoin
- Released: 1998
- Genre: Zydeco
- Label: Rounder
- Producer: Scott Billington

Chris Ardoin chronology
Gon' Be Jus' Fine (1997)	Turn the Page (1998)	Best Kept Secret (2000)

Turn the Page is an album by the American musician Chris Ardoin, released in 1998. His band, Double Clutchin'—which included his brother, Sean—is also credited. Ardoin was still a teenager when the album was recorded.

== Production ==
The album was produced by Scott Billington. "Barres de la Prison" is a cover of the Canray Fontenot composition. "Pass the Dutchie" is a cover of the Musical Youth song.

== Critical reception ==
Professional ratings
Review scores
Source	Rating
AllMusic	4/5 stars
MusicHound World: The Essential Album Guide	4/5 stars
The Penguin Guide to Blues Recordings	3/4 stars

The Village Voice called the album "excellent," writing that "Fever for Your Flavor" is "powered by psychedelic space electronics and grown-up red-clay soul vocals that welcome zydeco to the urban jungle, blackboard jungle, and rubyfruit jungle simultaneously." The Boston Globe considered Ardoin "perhaps the nimblest accordionist now playing zydeco," and wrote that he "keeps his meanderings melodic, his solos (on both diatonic and triple-row accordions) intricate and playful."

The Orlando Sentinel noted that the band "strikes out for more experimental territory on the penultimate cut, 'Fever for Your Flavor', which employs some hip-hop rhythms in a spare, dub-influenced setting; Chris keeps the track grounded with a sneaky little riff that sounds a bit like the Pink Panther theme turned sideways." The Daily Herald deemed the album a mix of "soul, R&B and fast-cooking Zydeco rhythms." The Wall Street Journal concluded that Turn the Page "offers a choice sampling of today's crisp and energetic zydeco sound, which layers rich R&B-style vocal harmonies and Caribbean ska and reggae grooves over blues-drenched accordion playing." OffBeat listed Turn the Page as the best album of 1998.

AllMusic wrote that Ardoin and his band "continue to be the most forward-looking of the young zydeco bands coming up... When they talk about zydeco being irresistible dance music, this is what they're talking about."

== Track listing ==
No.	Title	Length
1.	"Your Love Keeps Lifting Me (Higher and Higher)"
2.	"Talk Talk"
3.	"Acting the Devil"
4.	"Turn the Page"
5.	"Give It Up"
6.	"Stay In or Stay Out – Pass the Dutchie"
7.	"Tiffany Two Step"
8.	"I Got My Name"
9.	"Friends Ain't Forever"
10.	"Feel the Pain"
11.	"Before the Deal Was Done"
12.	"My Baby Done Gone"
13.	"Barres de la Prison"
14.	"Early One Morning"
15.	"Double Clutchin' Old Style"
16.	"Fever for Your Flavor"
17.	"Outro"
