= Kevin Gordon (musician) =

American singer-songwriter

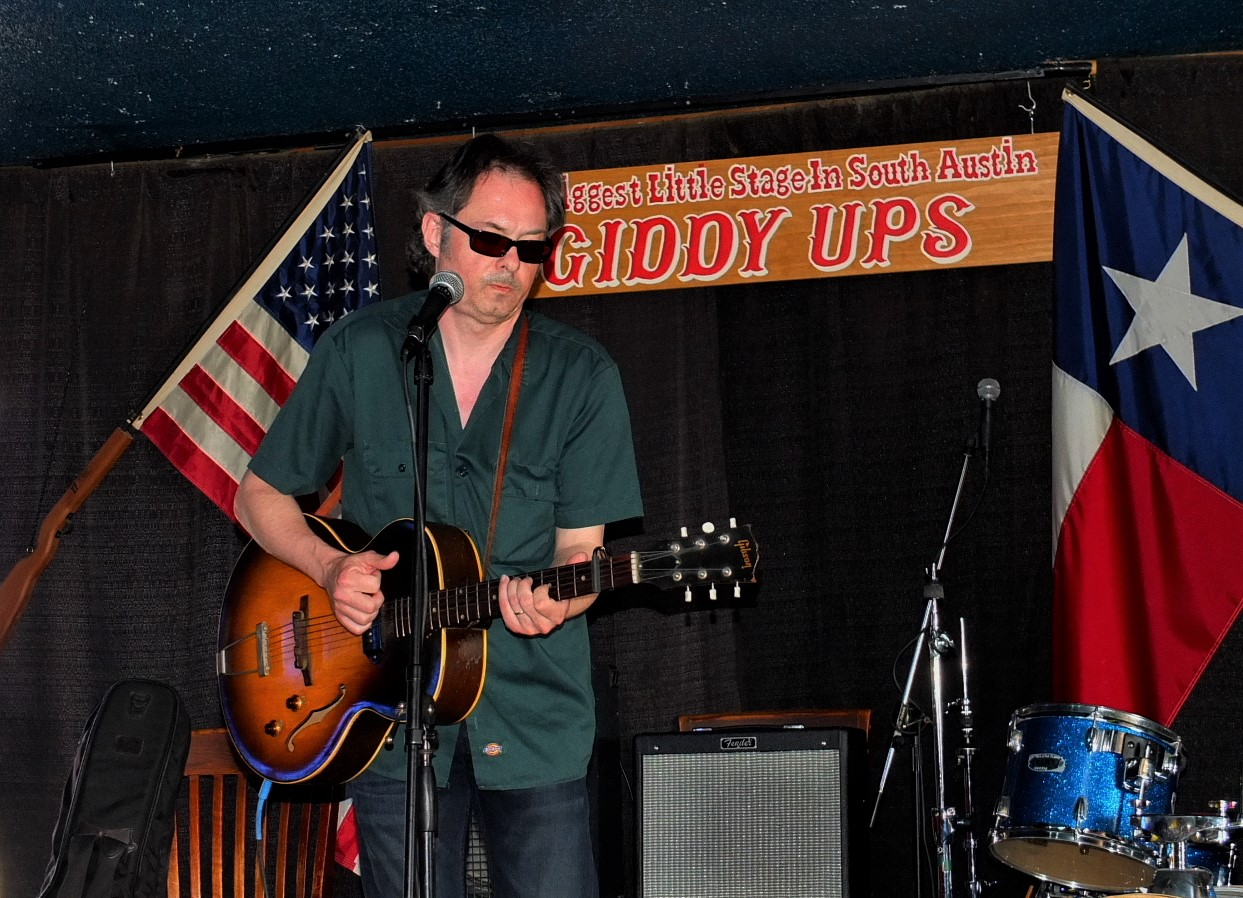
- SXSW 2013. Photo - Ron Baker.

Background information
- Born: 1964 (age 61–62); West Monroe, Louisiana
- Genres: Rock music, Americana music, blues music
- Occupations: Musician, poet
- Instrument: Guitar
- Years active: 1992–present
- Labels: Shanachie, Crowville
- Website: kg.kevingordon.net

Kevin Gordon is an American singer, songwriter, guitarist, poet, and folk art collector from Louisiana. His songs draw from experiences growing up in the South, and have been recorded by Levon Helm, Keith Richards, Webb Wilder, and Irma Thomas.

== Biography ==
=== Early years ===
Gordon was raised in West Monroe, Louisiana, where he was exposed to blues, honky tonk and rockabilly. He started playing guitar and writing songs at age 17 or 18, and played in a punk band while in high school that performed Ramones and Sex Pistols covers.

While Gordon was attending the University of Louisiana at Monroe, poet Jorie Graham encouraged Gordon to apply to the University of Iowa Writers Workshop, where he earned a master's degree in poetry. On weekends he began playing local gigs with Bo Ramsey. Gordon moved to Nashville in 1992 to work as a songwriter.

=== Recording career ===
==== Carnival Time ====
Gordon's first album was Carnival Time in 1993, initially released on cassette and later reissued on CD. Gordon is joined by Ramsey (guitars), Steve Hayes (drums), Mike Murray and Rick Cicalo (bass), Mitchell Moss (fiddle, mandolin), Dave Moore (accordion), and Al Murphy (fiddle).

==== Cadillac Jack's #1 Son ====
E Street Band bassist Garry Tallent produced Gordon's 1997 EP Illinois 5 a.m. on the Motherlode label. Gordon and Gwil Owen co-wrote four songs for Gordon's 1998 album Cadillac Jack's #1 Son which was also produced by Tallent.

==== Down to the Well ====
Gordon's next album Down to the Well was released in 2000. Personnel included Joe McMahan (guitars, mandolin), David Jacques (bass), Paul Griffith and Bryan Owings (drums), Kevin McKendree (keyboards), and Bo Ramsey (slide guitar).

==== O Come Look At The Burning ====
Gordon recorded 2005's O Come Look At The Burning live to a 16-track tape recorder in McMahan's home. The album included covers of Eddie Hinton's "Something Heavy" and Willie Dixon's "Crazy Mixed Up World."

==== Gloryland ====
Gordon's 2012 release Gloryland was produced by Joe McMahan and supported by Scott Martin (drums), and Ryan Norris (keyboards) of Lambchop. A standout song is "Colfax" which related a childhood memory of a high school band and the KKK over 10 minutes of ever-changing music. Another highlight is "Pecolia's Star," a duet with Sarah Siskind about folk artist Pecolia Warner.

==== Long Gone Time ====
Recorded in Louisiana, 2015's Long Gone Time was again produced by Joe McMahan, and drew praise for his lyrical imagery drawn from growing up in the South.

=== Other credits ===
Keith Richards, Levon Helm, Scotty Moore, and D.J. Fontana recorded "Deuce And A Quarter" (written by Gordon and Owen) for the 1997 album All the King's Men.

Gordon's duet with Lucinda Williams on the song "Down to the Well" (co-written with Colin Linden) was featured on the 2001 Oxford American Southern Music Sampler in their annual Southern music issue.

In 2009, HBO licensed Gordon's song "Watching The Sun Go Down" for the television series True Blood.

=== Gordon Gallery ===
Gordon collects folk art in his home in East Nashville. His collection can be viewed by appointment or at his Gordon Gallery website. His collection is also exhibited in shows at local venues.

== Discography ==
=== Solo albums ===
- 1994: Carnival Time (Taxim Records)
- 1997: Illinois 5 AM EP (Motherlode)
- 1998: Cadillac Jack's #1 Son (Shanachie)
- 2000: Down To the Well (Shanachie)
- 2005: O Come Look at the Burning (Crowville)
- 2009: Salvage & Drift #1 (self-released) compilation of live tracks, demos, and rarities
- 2012: Gloryland (Crowville)
- 2015: Long Gone Time (Crowville)

=== As composer ===
- 1995: Bo Ramsey - Live (Trailer) - track 8, "Get Away" (co-written with Bo Ramsey)
- 1996: Sonny Burgess - Sonny Burgess Has Still Got It (Rounder) - track 9, "Fast Train" (co-written with Gwil Owen)
- 1997: Mark Insley - Good Country Junk (Country Town) - track 7, "Six Feet Under"
- 1998: Kate Campbell - Visions of Plenty (Compass) - track 5, "This Side of Heaven"; track 11, "Sing Me Out" (both songs co-written with Kate Campbell)
- 2000: Southside Johnny and the Asbury Jukes - Messin' with the Blues (Leroy) - track 9, "Cadillac Jack"
- 2002: David Zollo - The Big Night (Trailer) - track 5, "Get Away" (co-written with Bo Ramsey)
- 2004: John Reischman - Field Day (Copper Creek) - track 10, "Over the Levee" (co-written with Trisha Gagnon)
- 2005: Kate Campbell - Blues and Lamentations (Large River) - track 4, "Freedom Train" (co-written with Kate Campbell)
- 2006: Irma Thomas - After the Rain (Rounder) - track 2, "Flowers" (co-written with Gwil Owen)
- 2008: Kate Campbell - Save the Day (Large River) - track 11, "Shining Like the Sun" (co-written with Kate Campbell)
- 2008: Eric Brace and Peter Cooper - You Don't Have to Like Them Both (Red Beet) - track 3, "Down to the Well" (co-written with Colin Linden)
- 2008: Sean Garvey - California Parable (Small Town Graffiti) - track 5, "Layback Woman"; track 9, "Hard Way to Go" (both songs co-written with Sean Garvey)
- 2014: Hard Working Americans - Hard Working Americans (Melvin) - track 3, "Down to the Well"
- 2014: Hard Working Americans CD/DVD - The First Waltz (Melvin) - track 3 on DVD, "Down To the Well"
- 2016: Julie Christensen and Stone Cupid - The Cardinal (Stone Cupid) - track 6, "Saint on a Chain"
- 2018: Shemekia Copeland - America's Child (Alligator Records) - track 10, "One I Love" (co-written with Gwil Owen)
- 2022: Julie Christensen - 11 From Kevin: Songs of Kevin Gordon (Wirebird Records)

=== Appears on ===
- 1999: Bob Delevante - Porchlight (Relay)
- 2003: Kate Campbell - Twang on a Wire (Evangeline)
- 2008: David Egan - You Don't Know Your Mind (Out of the Past / Rhonda Sue)
- 2008: Scott Kempner - Saving Grace (MRI)
- 2011: Chris Canterbury - Poets, Prophets, and All Things Forgotten (Back Porch)
