= Sean Ardoin =

American zydeco musician

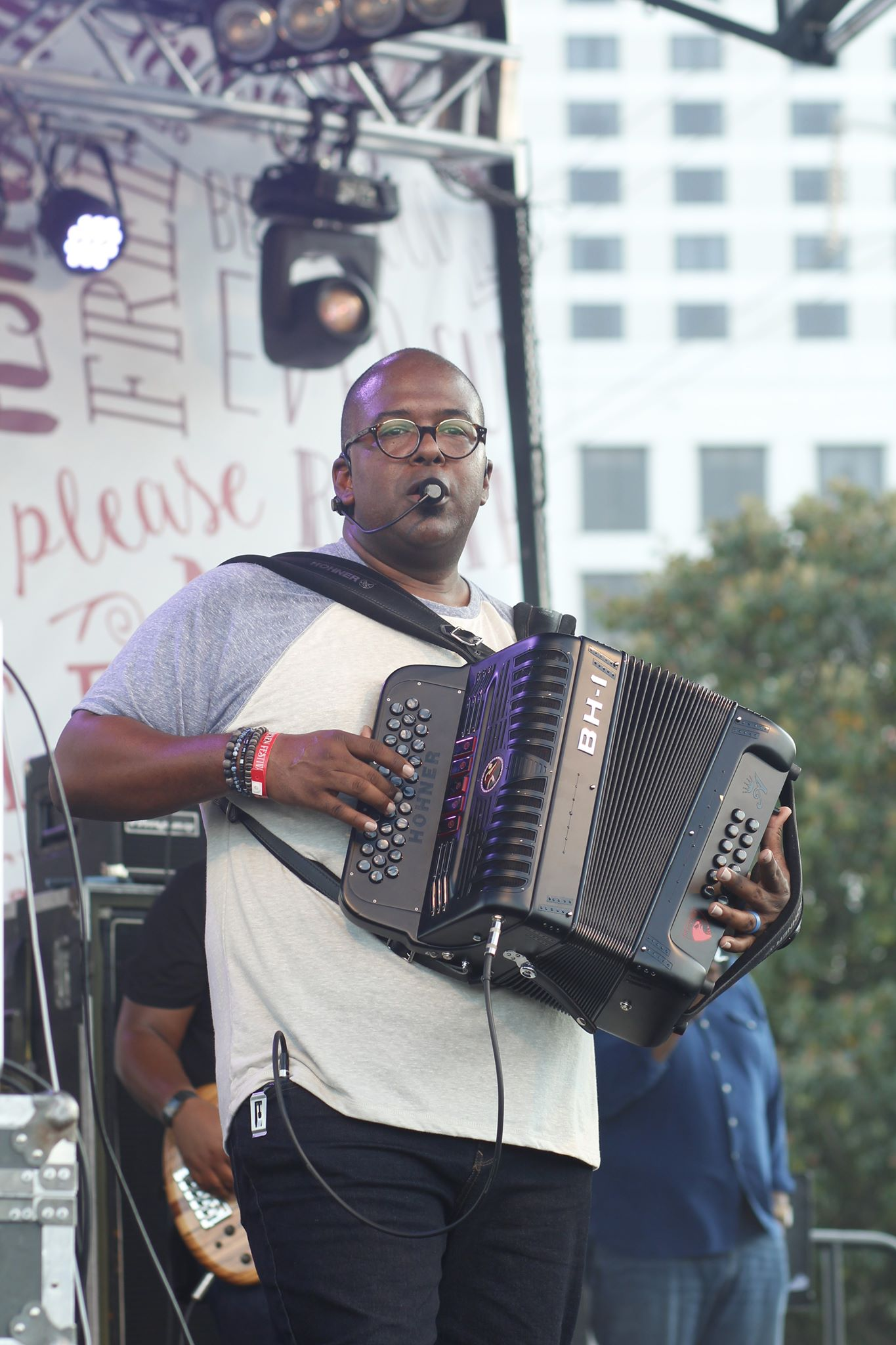

Background information
- Born: 1969 (age 56–57)
- Genres: Zydeco
- Occupation: Musician
- Instrument: Accordion
- Years active: 2000–present
- Labels: Zydekool Records

Sean Ardoin (born 1969) is an American Zydeco musician, singer and four-time Grammy Award nominee.

He is best known for live performance appearances, including at Carnegie Hall and the New Orleans Jazz & Heritage Festival, and his album releases such as Kreole Rock and Soul, and the single "Kick Rocks".

== Early life ==
Sean Ardoin was born in Eunice, Louisiana, and is a descendant of Amédé Ardoin, referred to as the Father of Zydeco by music scholars for laying the groundwork for Creole music in the early 20th century.

Ardoin is also the descendant of noted creole musician Alphonse "Bois Sec" Ardoin and creole musician, Lawrence "Black" Ardoin (father). He is the older brother of hip-hop zydeco accordionist Chris Ardoin.

== Career ==
Prior to the release of Kreole Rock and Soul, Sean Ardoin was best known for the release of 2001 "Pullin'", as well as 2009 album "How Great Is Your Love" which marked the first notable zydeco Gospel album. He released the album Kreole Rock and Soul in November 2018.

The album Kreole Rock and Soul was nominated in the 2019 Grammy Awards category "Best Regional Roots Music Album", and Ardoin was also nominated in the category "Best American Roots Performance" for the song Kick Rocks.

Ardoin has performed on MTV's Road Rules, Real World, Fraternity Life, Sorority Life, BET's Comic View, and was featured on CBS Primetime's NCIS New Orleans, Bravo TV's Southern Charm New Orleans, and Queen Sugar on Oprah Winfrey's OWN Network.

In 2019, Ardoin was featured on The Late Show with Stephen Colbert.

In 2020, Ardoin released a single, "What Do You See" and video featuring Kirk Whalum, which became a viral anthem of the George Floyd Protests era, commemorated in a feature on the Grammy.com website.

Ardoin and Kreole Rock and Soul were nominated for a 2023 Grammy Award in the Best Regional Roots Music Album category, for Full Circle.

== Awards and honors ==
=== Grammy Awards ===
Year	Category	Work nominated	Result	Ref.
2019	Best Regional Roots Music Album	Kreole Rock and Soul	Nominated	
2019	Best American Roots Performance	"Kick Rocks"	Nominated	
2022	Best Regional Roots Music Album	Live in New Orleans! (with Kreole Rock & Soul)	Nominated	
2023	Best Regional Roots Music Album	Full Circle (with Kreole Rock & Soul and the Golden Band from Tigerland)	Nominated	

=== OffBeat's Best of The Beat Awards ===
Year	Category	Result	Ref.
2001	Best Emerging Zydeco Band or Performer (with Zydekool)	Won	

== Discography ==
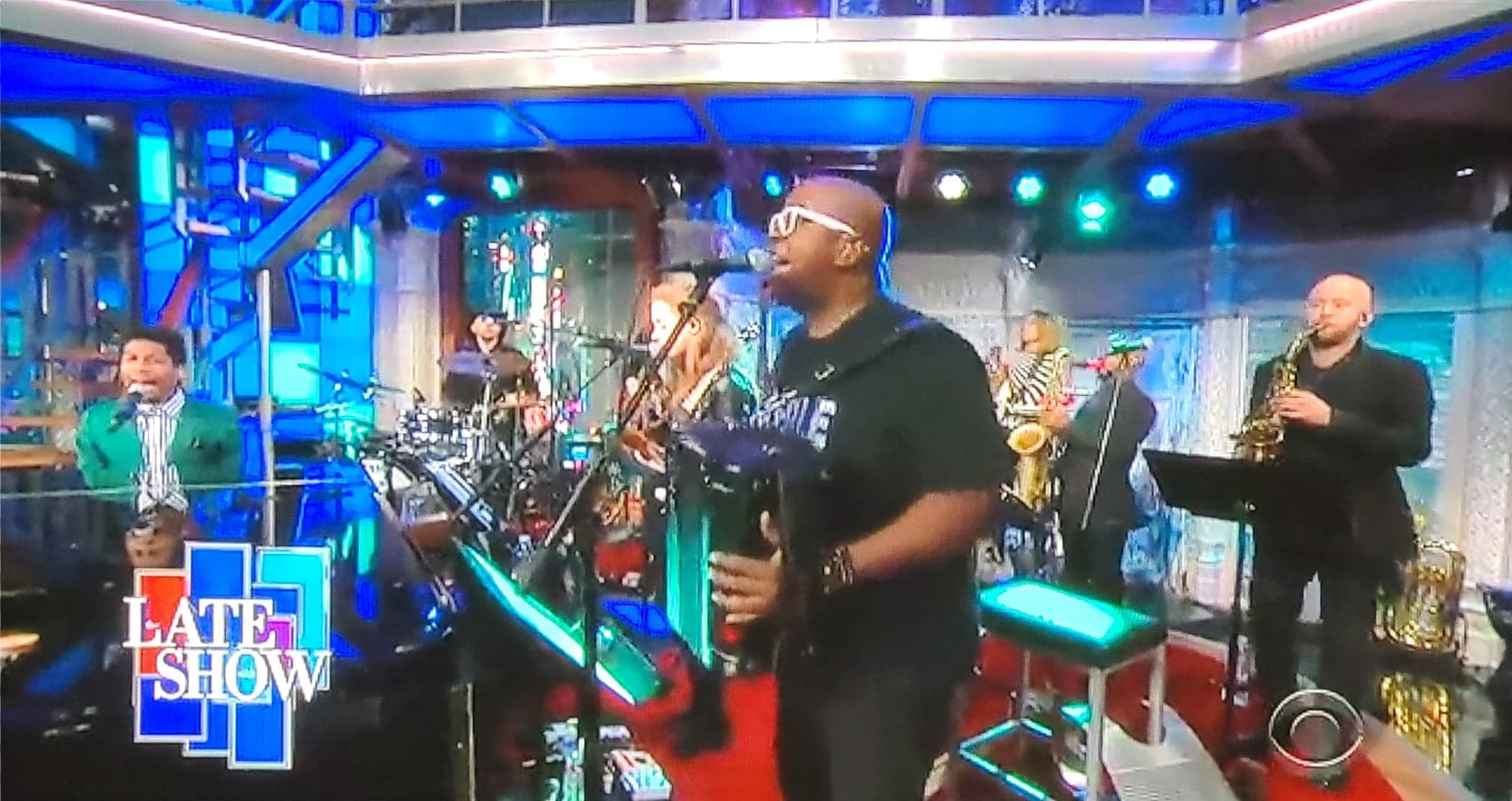
Sean Ardoin appearing on The Late Show with Stephen Colbert in 2019

Sean Ardoin:

- 1991 Lawrence Ardoin and Lanniappe - Maison de Soul
- 1994 Chris Ardoin and Double Clutchin "That's the Lick!" (Maison de Soul)
- 1995 Chris Ardoin and Double Clutchin "Lick it up" (Maison de Soul)
- 1997 Chris Ardoin and Double Clutchin "Gon be Jus Fine" (Rounder Records)
- 1998 Chris Ardoin and Double Clutchin Turn the Page (Rounder Records)
- 1999 Sean Ardoin-n-Zydekool (self titled) (Zydekool Records)
- 2001 Sean Ardoin-n-Zydekool "Pullin" (Tomorrow Records)
- 2003 Sean Ardoin-n-Zydekool "Home Brew" (Tomorrow Records)
- 2004 Sean Ardoin-n-Zydekool "Strictly for the Dancers" (Zydekool Records)
- 2009 Sean Ardoin and R.O.G.K. "How Great is Your Love" (Zydekool Records)
- 2010 Sean Ardoin-n-Zydekool "Final Chapter: New Beginning" (Zydekool Records)
- 2013 Sean Ardoin-n-Zydekool "RETURN OF THE KOOL" (Zydekool Records)
- 2013 Creole United "Non Jamais Fait" (Creole United Records)
- 2016 Sean Ardoin-n-Zydekool “Live at the Chicken Run”
- 2018 Creole United “Tu Kekkchause a Korrek”
- 2018 Sean Ardoin “Kreole Rock and Soul”
- 2020 Sean Ardoin “Came Thru Pullin’”
- 2023 Sean Ardoin “Mosaic”
