= Chris Ardoin =

American singer (born 1981)

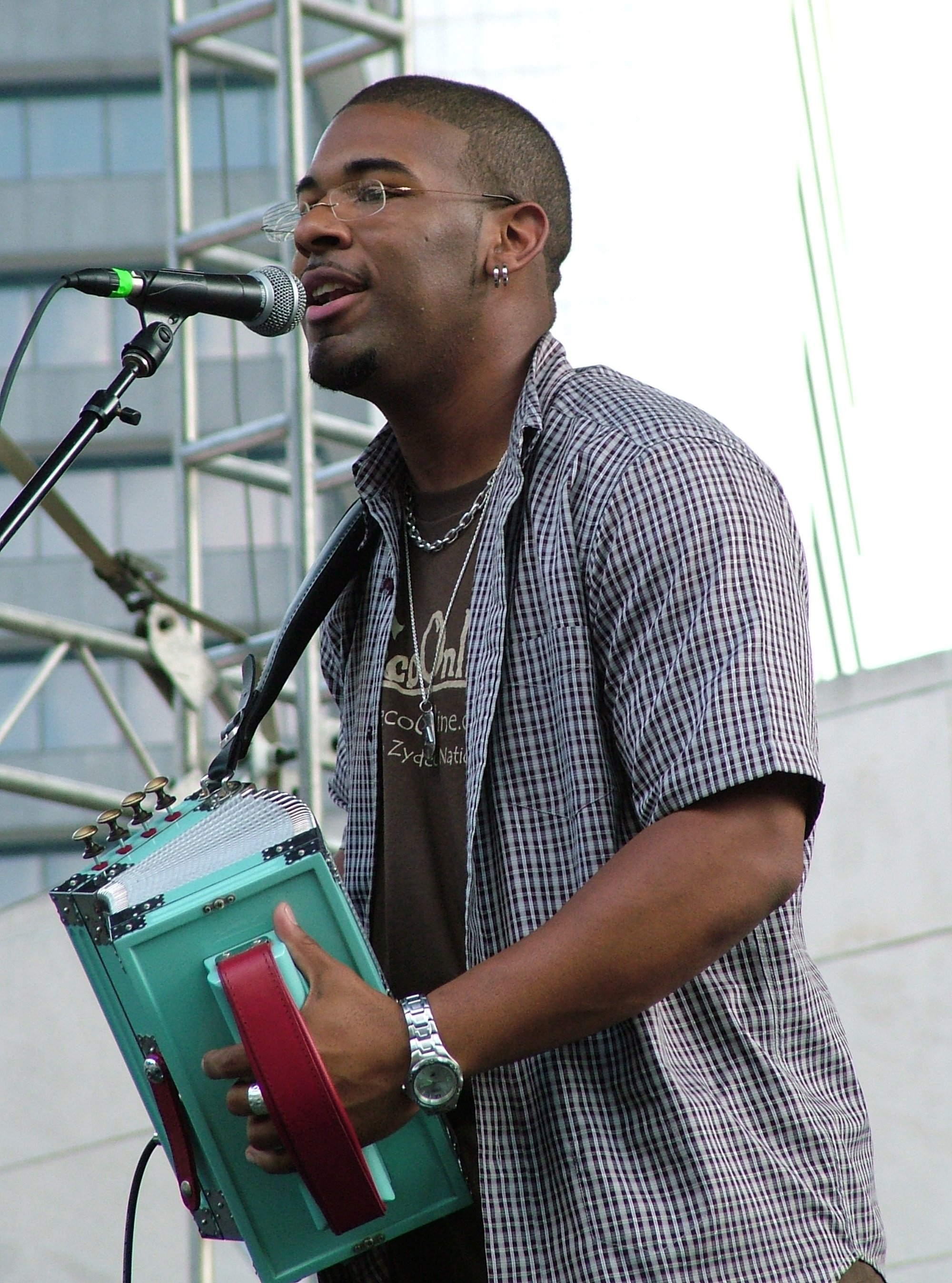
- Ardoin performing in June 2005

Background information
- Born: Christopher Ardoin; April 7, 1981 (age 45); Lake Charles, Louisiana, U.S.
- Genres: Zydeco
- Occupations: Singer, musician
- Instruments: Accordion, vocals
- Labels: Maison de Soul, Rounder, J&S, NuStep4Lyfe, Soul Rehab
- Website: https://chrisardoinmusic.com/

Chris Ardoin (born April 7, 1981) is a zydeco accordionist and singer. He is one of the young artists that helped form nouveau zydeco, a new style of music that fused traditional zydeco with various styles including hip-hop, reggae and R&B.

== Biography ==
Born in Lake Charles, Louisiana, Ardoin was a child prodigy belonging to a musical dynasty (his father was Lawrence Ardoin and his grandfather was Bois Sec Ardoin). His older brother is Gospel zydeco artist Sean Ardoin. He started with the accordion at the age of two and grew up listening to zydeco only for the most part until he was in his teens. When he was just ten, with help from his father Lawrence, he formed the Double Clutchin' zydeco band with his elder brother Sean Ardoin on drums.

In 1994, the band released their debut album That's Da Lick on the Maison de Soul label. Though it was Sean who handled all the vocals and songwriting, the album was credited to Chris as they considered putting younger Chris in front would draw more attention to the band. Chris came more into the center of the spotlight in the follow-up effort Lick It Up! released a year later, sharing vocals and songwriting duties with Sean. Sean left the band after releasing the album Turn the Page in 1998 to concentrate on his solo career.

In 2005, Ardoin changed the band name from Double Clutchin' to NuStep, and released Sweat, the first album under the new name. M.V.P. followed in 2006, V.I.P in 2008, Alter Ego in 2009, and Headliner in 2010.

On July 30, 2021, Ardoin was hit by gunfire in a seemingly-random shooting following a performance at the Zydeco Bike Fest in Colfax, Louisiana. As of February 2022, no charges have been filed in the case.

On March 4, 2025, as Ardoin performed on stage during Mardi Gras festivities in Mamou, Louisiana at least one person opened fire, killing two and injuring twelve others. Ardoin, his 13-year-old son who was on stage, and his band members were uninjured. Ardoin said that when the shooting began, a band member jumped onto his son to shield him before he also jumped onto him before the entire band was shielded by law enforcement. After the attack, Ardoin said that he would no longer perform outdoors and that he would only perform at indoor venues that he felt were safe enough.

== Awards and honors ==
=== OffBeat's Best of The Beat Awards ===
| Year | Category | Work nominated | Result | Ref. |
|---|---|---|---|---|
| 1997 | Best Emerging Zydeco Band or Performer (with Double Clutchin') | | Won | |
| 1998 | Best Zydeco Album | Turn the Page (with Double Clutchin') | Won | |
| 2007 | Best Zydeco Band or Performer (with NuStep) | | Won | |

== Discography ==
- 1994 That's Da Lick (Maison de Soul)
- 1995 Lick It Up! (Maison de Soul)
- 1997 Gon' Be Jus' Fine (Rounder)
- 1998 Turn the Page (Rounder)
- 2000 Best Kept Secret (Rounder)
- 2003 Life (J&S)
- 2004 Save the Last Dance (J&S)
- 2005 Sweat (NuStep4Lyfe Entertainment)
- 2006 M.V.P. (NuStep4Lyfe Entertainment)
- 2008 Candyman's V.I.P. (NuStep4Lyfe Entertainment)
- 2009 Alter Ego (NuStep4Lyfe Entertainment)
- 2010 Headliner (NuStep4Lyfe Entertainment)
- 2012 Unleashed (NuStep4Lyfe Entertainment)
- 2014 Back Home (NuStep4Lyfe Entertainment)
- 2015 Zydeko Fever (NuStep4Lyfe Entertainment)
- 2016 Requested Live (NuStep4Lyfe Entertainment)
- 2017 Legend (Soul Rehab Music Group)
- 2018 Evolution (Soul Rehab Music Group)
- 2020 Press Play: Live (Soul Rehab Music Group)
