= Scott Billington =

American record producer and label executive, and musician

- Born: October 27, 1951 (age 74); Melrose, Massachusetts, U.S.

Scott Billington (born October 27, 1951, in Melrose, Massachusetts) is an American record producer, songwriter, record company executive and blues musician.

== Biography ==
Billington's career began in Boston in the early 1970s, when he managed the New England Music City record store and edited the music magazine Pop Top. He was a member of the Boston Blues Society, which staged concerts by Son House, Mance Lipscomb, Johnny Shines and other first-generation bluesmen. In the mid-1970s he joined the staff of Rounder Records, where he first worked in the record label's sales, promotion and art departments.

In 1978, he and author Peter Guralnick edited live Boston Blues Society tapes to produce the Johnny Shines' album, Hey-Ba-Ba-Re Bop. He began producing for musicians in genres of music such as blues, Cajun, jazz and zydeco. His 1981 production of bluesman Clarence "Gatemouth" Brown won the first Grammy Award for Rounder Records. In the mid-1980s, he created the Modern New Orleans Masters Series for Rounder. Over the years, he has produced Charlie Rich, Solomon Burke, Johnny Adams, The Dirty Dozen Brass Band, Soul Rebels Brass Band, Irma Thomas, James Booker, Tangle Eye, Girl Authority among other artists on Rounder and other labels. His records have won a total of 3 Grammy® Awards and 11 Grammy® nominations.

As a harmonica player, Billington has recorded with Irma Thomas, Boozoo Chavis, Sleepy LaBeef, Johnette Downing, Theryl deClouet and others. He has toured with Nathan Williams & the Zydeco Cha Chas, a Louisiana-based zydeco band, appearing at the New Orleans Jazz and Heritage Festival, the Efes Pilsen Blues Festival (Istanbul) and the Montreal Jazz Festival. He played harmonica on the soundtrack to the Henry Fonda/Myrna Loy ABC-TV film, Summer Solstice, and on the PBS-TV series Zoom and Nova.

Billington's writing has appeared in Yankee, the Oxford American, Gambit and The Boston Globe. He has also written liner notes for many of his recordings. He has lectured at Harvard University, the New England Conservatory of Music, and Loyola University, as well as at several Grammy in the Schools events. As a graphic designer and art director, Billington created hundreds of album covers for Rounder and other labels.

Billington is employed as vice president of A&R for Rounder/Concord Records. He lives in New Orleans with his wife, the children's musician and author Johnette Downing, with whom he performs as the duo Johnette and Scott.
