= Creole music =

Music genre preceding lala, zydeco, and cajun music

Creole music of Louisiana
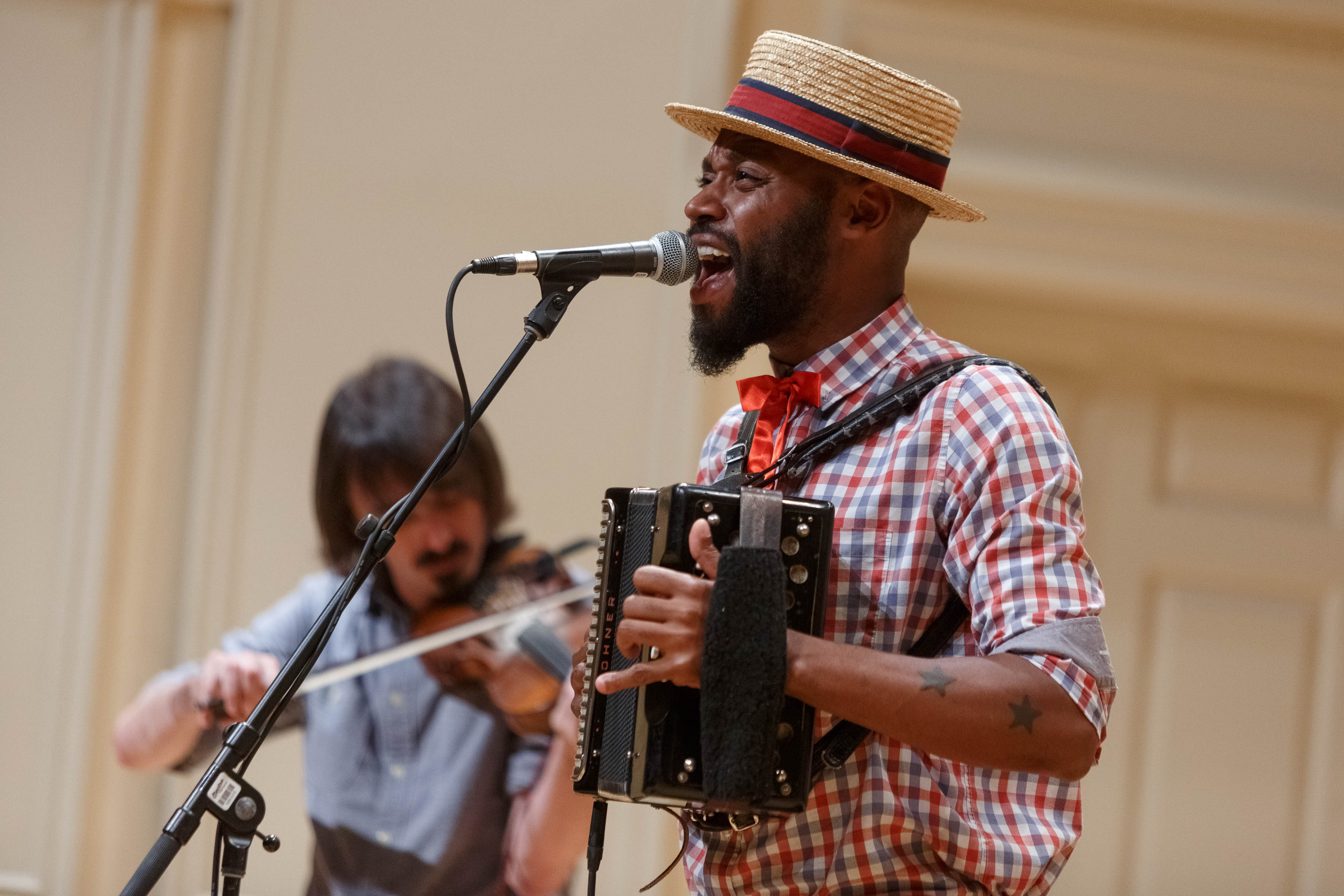
- Cedric Watson playing a diatonic button accordion
- Native name: Musique créole
- Stylistic origins: Music of West Africa; French folk music; Acadian music; Music of Haiti; Music of Spain; Old-time music; Blues
- Cultural origins: 18th – 19th centuries, Louisiana
- Typical instruments: Vocals; fiddle; rubboard; Triangle; accordion; guitar

Subgenres
- Juré; la la; zydeco; art song

The term Creole music (French: musique créole) is used to refer to two distinct musical traditions: art songs adapted from 19th-century vernacular music; or the vernacular traditions of Louisiana Creole people which have persisted as 20th- and 21st-century la la and zydeco in addition to influencing Cajun music.

== Early development ==
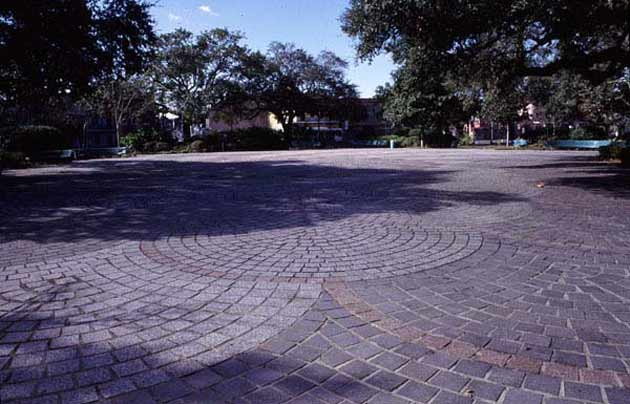
Congo Square in New Orleans

In 1803, the United States purchased the Louisiana Territory, including New Orleans, from France. In 1809 and 1810, more than 10,000 refugees from the West Indies arrived in New Orleans, most of them from French-speaking Haiti. Of these, about 3,000 were freed slaves.

Creole folk songs originated on the plantations of the French and Spanish colonists of Louisiana. The music characteristics embody African-derived syncopated rhythms, the habanera accent of Spain, and the quadrille of France.

Central to Creole musical activities was Place Congo (in English: Congo Square). The much quoted 1886 article by George Washington Cable offers this description:

The booming of African drums and blast of huge wooden horns called to the gathering ... The drums were very long, hollowed, often from a single piece of wood, open at one end and having a sheep or goat skin stretched across the other ... The smaller drum was often made from a joint or two of very large bamboo ... and this is said to be the origin of its name; for it was called the Bamboula.

Cable then describes a variety of instruments used at Congo Square, including gourds, triangles, jaw harps, jawbones, and "the grand instrument at last", the four-stringed banjo. The bamboula, or "bamboo-drum", accompanied the bamboula dance and bamboula songs. Chase writes, "For Cable, the bamboula represented 'a frightful triumph of body over the mind,' and 'Only the music deserved to survive, and does survive ... '"

== Creole art song ==
Creole vernacular music of the 19th century was adapted by composers into art songs.

=== Louis Moreau Gottschalk ===
At the time of Louis Moreau Gottschalk's birth in 1829, 'Caribbean' was perhaps the best word to describe the musical atmosphere of New Orleans. Although the inspiration for Gottschalk's compositions, such as "Bamboula" and "The Banjo", has often been attributed to childhood visits to Congo Square, no documentation exists for any such visits, and it is more likely that he learned the Creole melodies and rhythms that inform these pieces from Sally, his family's enslaved nurse from Saint-Domingue, who Gottschalk referred to as "La Négresse Congo". Whether Gottschalk actually attended the Congo Square dances, his music is certainly emblematic of the crossroads that formed there.

Born in New Orleans and reared in the culture of Saint-Domingue, he toured throughout the Caribbean and was particularly acclaimed in Cuba. Gottschalk was closely associated with the Cuban pianist and composer, Manuel Saumell Robredo, a master of the contradanza, widely popular dance compositions based on the African-derived habanera rhythm. It is likely that contradanzas composed by both Gottschalk and Saumell were an antecedent to the ragtime compositions of Scott Joplin and Jelly Roll Morton.

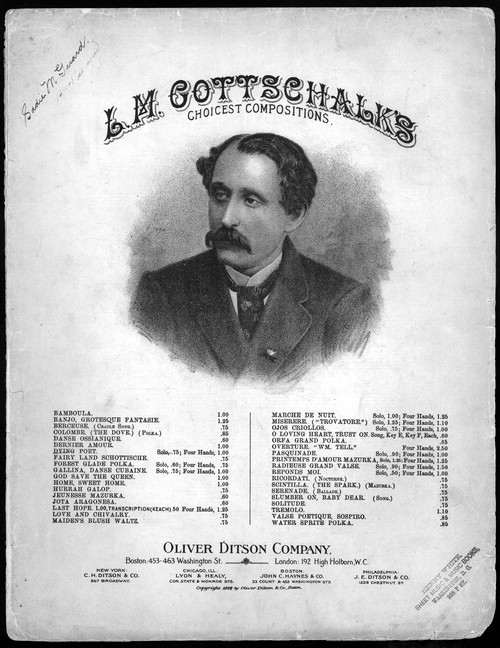
Louis Moreau Gottschalk pictured on an 1864 publication

Perone's bio-bibliography lists hundreds of Gottschalk's compositions. Among them are three solo piano works based on Creole melodies:

Bamboula, danse des nègres, based on "Musieu Bainjo" and "Tan Patate-là Tcuite" ("Quan' patate la cuite").
La Savane, ballad crèole, based on "Lolotte", also known as "Pov'piti Lolotte".
Le Bananier, chanson nègre, based on "En avan', Grenadie'", which like other Creole folk melodies, was also a popular French song.

In America's Music (revised third edition, page 290), Chase writes:

Le Bananier was one of the three pieces based on Creole tunes that had a tremendous success in Europe and that I have called the "Louisiana Trilogy". [The other two are Bamboula and La Savane.] All three were composed between 1844 and 1846, when Gottschalk was still a teenager ... The piece that created the greatest sensation was Bamboula.

Chase apparently overlooked a fourth Creole melody used by Gottschalk on his Op. 11 (Three other melodies had already been identified for this piece). In her 1902 compilation, Gottschalk's sister, Clara Gottschalk Peterson, arranged "Po' Pitie Mamzé Zizi", and included a footnote: "L. M. Gottschalk used this melody for his piece entitled Le Mancenillier, sérénade, Op. 11."

Regarding "Misieu Bainjo", used in Gottschalk's Bamboula, the editors of Slave Songs write "... the attempt of some enterprising negro to write a French song; he is certainly to be congratulated on his success." The song has been published in more than a dozen collections prior to 1963, listed by the Archive of Folk Culture, Library of Congress.

=== Good Hope Plantation, St. Charles Parish ===
Songs numbered 130-136 in Slave Songs of the United States, according to a note on page 113,

were obtained from a lady who heard them sung, before the war, on the "Good Hope" plantation, St. Charles Parish, Louisiana ... Four of these songs, Nos. 130, 131, 132, and 133, were sung to a simple dance, a sort of minuet, called the Coonjai; the name and the dance are probably both of African origin. When the Coonjai is danced, the music is furnished by an orchestra of singers, the leader of whom—a man selected both for the quality of his voice and for his skill in improvising—sustains the solo part, while the others afford him an opportunity, as they shout in chorus, for inventing some neat verse to compliment some lovely danseuse, or celebrate the deeds of some plantation hero. The dancers themselves never sing ... and the usual musical accompaniment, besides that of the singers, is that furnished by a skilful performer on the barrel-head-drum, the jaw-bone and key, or some other rude instrument. ... It will be noticed that all these songs are "seculars" [not spirituals]; and that while the words of most of them are of very little account, the music is as peculiar, as interesting, and, in the case of two or three of them, as difficult to write down, or to sing correctly, as any [of the 129 songs] that have preceded them.

The words "obtained from a lady who heard them sung" suggest that the songs were written down by someone, perhaps the lady herself, but certainly someone adept at music notation who was able to understand and write down the patois. It seems likely that she or he was a guest or a member of the La Branche family, who resided at the plantation until 1859, shortly after which the plantation was devastated by flood. This family included United States chargé d'affaires to Texas and a Speaker of the Louisiana House of Representatives, Alcée Louis la Branche.

We may never know the identity of the person who wrote down the seven Creole folk songs as sung at Good Hope Plantation, but it is noteworthy that Good Hope (town), Good Hope Floodwall, Good Hope Oil and Gas Field, Bayou La Branche, and, especially, La Branche Wetlands are today well known names in St. Charles Parish, where the seven songs were once sung.

=== The Louisiana Lady ===
During the 1930s and 1940s, Camille Nickerson performed art songs adapted from Creole folk music professionally as "The Louisiana Lady." During an interview with Doris E. McGinty, Professor Nickerson told of her first performance at a parish in New Iberia. "I was dressed in Creole costume and sang for about an hour and a half, and was very well received. Now this was a white audience; such a thing was unheard of in Louisiana, especially in the rural section such as this was. The enthusiasm of the audience showed me what an impact the Creole song could have."

=== Compilations and arrangements of Creole art songs ===
In any discussion of Creole folk songs, compilations of such songs play an essential role, not only for defining "Creole folk music", but also as a source of information, and, for performers, a possible source of arrangements. A brief summary of published compilations (with citations in References) follows:

- Slave Songs of the United States (1867) the earliest known compilation; 7 unaccompanied melodies with words.
- Creole Songs from New Orleans in the Negro-Dialect (1902)
- Notes d'ethnographie musicale - La Musique chez les peuples indegenes de l'Amerique du Nord, (1910); this scholarly work by Julien Tiersot contains several Creole folk songs not found elsewhere, notably "Chanson nègre de la Louisiane" obtained from Professor Alcée Fortier.
- Afro-American Folksongs (1915)
- Six Creole Folk-Songs (1921)
- Bayou Ballads: Twelve Folk-Songs from Louisiana (1921); texts and music collected by Mina Monroe, edited with the collaboration of Kurt Schindler. In the introduction, Monroe (who was born Marie Thereze Bernard in New Orleans, September 2, 1886), offers these insights:

The most definite recollections of my childhood on the Labranche Plantation in St. Charles Parish where we lived, are of the singing and dancing of the negroes. This plantation had been in our family from the days of the early settlers and, by a trick of fortune years after the war, with its resulting shiftings and changes, my grandmother found herself mistress of a plantation on which she had lived as a child. Many of the negroes who had wandered away (in fact, nearly all of them) had by then returned to their birthplace to find themselves practically under the same masters ...

Monroe's compilation includes ample notes about each of the twelve folk songs. The songs are arranged for solo voice with piano accompaniment ..."suitable and attractive for concert singers."

- Chansons Nègres, includes arrangements by Tiersot for solo voice and piano of these Creole folk songs: "Papa Dit Non, Maman Dit Oui", "Monsieur Banjo", "Pauv' Pitit' Mamzell' Zizi", "Un Bal" (= "Michié Préval"),"Les Jours du Temps Passé", "Quand Patates Sont Cuites", "Bal Fini", "Compère Lapin", and "Aurore Bradère".
- Louisiana French Folk Songs, Chapter 6: "Creole Folk Songs" (1939)
- Creole Songs of the Deep South (1946)

Date	Code	Compilation
1867	SS	Slave Songs of the United States (final 7 songs)
1902	CS	Creole Songs from New Orleans in the Negro-Dialect
1915	AA	Afro-American Folksongs
1921	CF	Six Creole Folk-Songs
1921	BB	Bayou Ballads: Twelve Folk-Songs from Louisiana
1939	LF	Louisiana French Folk Songs (Chapter 6: "Creole Folk Songs")
1946	DS	Creole Songs of the Deep South

== Creole vernacular music ==
Vernacular music among Louisiana Creole people combined African, French, Spanish, and Anglo-American influences. During the 19th century, this was expressed as a cappella juré music.

After the Civil War, sharecroppers were able to purchase instruments and hold house parties. The music that developed into the early 20th century was called la la (or la-la). Though racial relations were strictly controlled, there were nevertheless opportunities for Creole and Cajun music to influence one another, particularly since Black Creole musicians were often hired for white parties. Accordionist Amédé Ardoin is an exemplar both stylistically as well as in his collaboration with white musicians such as fiddler Dennis McGee in the 1920s and 1930s. Other notable Black Creole musicians of this era were Alphonse "Bois Sec" Ardoin, Douglas Bellard, Bébé Carrière, Calvin Carrière, Claude Faulk, Canray Fontenot, Freeman Fontenot, Preston Frank, and Ed Poullard.

Around the mid-20th century, innovators like Clifton Chenier and Boozoo Chavis combined la la with other traditions, particularly blues and rhythm and blues, to create a new genre, zydeco.

== Contemporary musicians ==
Current practitioners of Creole music, including la la and/or zydeco, include:

- Chris Ardoin, accordionist and vocalist
- Jeffery Broussard and the Creole Cowboys
- Geno Delafose, accordionist and vocalist
- Keith Frank, accordionist and vocalist
- D'Jalma Garnier, guitarist and fiddler
- Joe Hall, accordionist and vocalist
- Beau Jocque, accordionist and vocalist
- Mitch Reed, fiddler
- Cedric Watson, fiddler, accordionist, and vocalist

An organization working to sustain Creole music since 1988 is C.R.E.O.L.E., Inc., based in Lafayette, Louisiana.

== Additional references ==
- Shane K. Bernard, Swamp Pop: Cajun and Creole Rhythm and Blues, University Press of Mississippi, Jackson, Mississippi, 1996. (Mentions black Creole music, but not Creole folk songs.)
- Florence E. Borders, "Researching Creole and Cajun Musics in New Orleans", Black Music Research Journal, vol. 8, no. 1 (1988) 15-31.
- George W. Cable, "The Dance in Place Congo", Century Magazine vol. 31, Feb., 1886, pp. 517–532.
- Doris E. McGinty and Camille Nickerson, "The Louisiana Lady", The Black Perspective in Music, vo. 7, no. 1 (Spring, 1979) 81-94.
- Camille Nickerson, Africo-Creole Music in Louisiana; a thesis on the plantation songs created by the Creole negroes of Louisiana, Oberlin College, 1932.
- James E. Perone, Louis Moreau Gottschalk, a Bio-Bibliography, Greenwood Press, Westport, Connecticut, 2002.
- Dorothy Scarborough, On the Trail of Negro Folk-Songs, Harvard University Press, 1925.
- S. Frederick Starr, Bamboula! The Life and Times of Louis Moreau Gottschalk, Oxford University Press, 2000.
- Julien Tiersot, "Notes d'ethnographie musicale: La Musique chez les peuples indigenes de l'Amerique du Nord", Sämmelbande der Internationalen Musikgesellschaft 11 (1910) 141-231. Melodies only, with musicological notes.
- Julien Tiersot, Chansons Nègres, Heugel, Paris, 1933.
- Ching Veillon, Creole Music Man: Bois Sec Ardoin, Xlibris, 2003.
