= Ivan Davis =

American musician (1932–2018)

- Born: February 4, 1932; Electra, Texas, USA
- Died: March 12, 2018 (aged 86)
- Occupations: Pianist and professor
- Employer: University of Miami-Frost School of Music
- Awards: St. Cecilia Piano Competition; Ferruccio Busoni International Piano Competition; Fulbright Scholar

Ivan Roy Davis, Jr. (February 4, 1932 – March 12, 2018) was an American classical pianist and longstanding member of the faculty at the University of Miami's Frost School of Music.

== Early life ==
Davis was born in Electra, Texas. He received his Bachelor of Music in 1952 from University of North Texas College of Music, and an Artist's Diploma, as a Fulbright Scholar, from the Santa Cecilia Academy in Rome. He won second prize in the 1956 and 1957 Ferruccio Busoni International Piano Competition and first prize in the 1958 St. Cecilia Piano Competition. In April 1960, Davis won the Franz Liszt Competition at Town Hall, New York City. Davis studied under Silvio Scionti, Carlo Zecchi and Vladimir Horowitz.

== Performance and recording career ==
External audio
- You may hear Ivan Davis playing Franz Liszt's: Étude No. 3 in D-flat major (Un sospiro); La Campanella; Liebestraum No. 3 Mephisto Waltz No. 1 Funerailles; Étude No. 2 in F minor (La leggierezza); Hungarian Rhapsody No. 6 in D-flat major in 1961 Here on archive.org

He debuted at New York City's Town Hall in 1959. Davis made his international debut at the Festival dei Due Mondi in Spoleto. In 1960, he signed with CBS Records and began a 60 concert cross-country tour. He toured the world with several major orchestras including the New York Philharmonic, the Cleveland Orchestra, the Chicago Symphony Orchestra, the Philadelphia Orchestra and the Spanish National Orchestra. He performed under such world-famous conductors as Leonard Bernstein, Eugene Ormandy and Lorin Maazel. He received the Handel Medallion from New York City for contributions to the city's cultural life. He recorded for London Records in the 1970s. From 1965, Davis was a professor of music at the University of Miami in Coral Gables, Florida. According to Grove Music Online: "His Queen Elizabeth Hall début recital in London in 1968 caused a sensation, and has become a collector's item on record. Further recordings, largely of 19th-century showpieces, have confirmed his exceptional exuberance and technical brilliance, most notably a Gottschalk recital of true virtuoso flair." The American classical pianist Richard Kastle was his student for more than three years.

== Discography ==
- "Rachmaninoff Piano Concerto No. 2, Ivan Davis with Henry Lewis conducting the Royal Philharmonic Orchestra", Decca Phase 4 stereo concert series, PFS 4214 1971
- "Davis Plays Czerny, Schumann, Liszt", Audiofon, CD 72004
- "The Wind Demon and other 19th century piano music", New World, 80257-2
- "Piano Music of Grieg – Ivan Davis", Audiofon, CD 72022
- "Liszt – Piano Concertos – Ivan Davis", Royal Philharmonic Orchestra conducted by Edward Downes. Coupled with solo performances of Hungarian Rhapsody No. 6 and Paraphrase on Wedding March and Dance of the Elves from Mendelssohn's incidental music to A Midsummer Night's Dream. London Weekend Classics, 421-629-2
- "Souvenir de Porto Rico – Piano Music of Gottschalk – Ivan Davis", London Weekend Classics, 436-108-2
- "Gershwin – Rhapsody in Blue – Cleveland Orchestra – Maazel", London Jubilee, 417-716-2
- "Digital George – Gershwin Classics", Musical Heritage Society, 513380w
- "Chopin – Favourite Piano Works – Ivan Davis", Castile Communications, CCD-106
- "Tchaikovsky – Piano Concerto No. 1 – Davis", Castile Communications, CCD-103
- "Liszt's Greatest Hits – Hungarian Fantasy with Ormandy, Philadelphia Orchestra, CBS-MLK-39450
- Great Galloping Gottschalk: America's First Superstar, London Records/Decca (1975) CS 6943
- "Music of George Antheil", Music Masters Classics (BMG), 67094-2

== Family ==
- On August 6, 1960, in New Canaan, Connecticut, Davis married Betty Lou Saxton, who studied at the Juilliard School and Columbia University.
