= Great Galloping Gottschalk =

Ballet

Great Galloping Gottschalk is a contemporary ballet with choreography by Lynne Taylor-Corbett, set to the music of American composer Louis Moreau Gottschalk. It premiered with the American Ballet Theatre (ABT) at the Miami Beach Theater of the Performing Arts on 12 January 1982.

== Music ==
The music, reminiscent of ragtime, consists of the following six selections from Gottschalk's piano works, orchestrated by Jack Elliott:

- Souvenir de Porto Rico
- The Dying Poet
- Tournament Galop
- La Savane and Oh ma charmante, épargnez-moi!
- Le Bananier
- Manchega

== Productions ==
Since its ABT premiere, Great Galloping Gottschalk has been staged by numerous ballet companies, including the Pennsylvania Ballet, Carolina Ballet, BalletMet Columbus, Kansas City Ballet, and Pittsburgh Ballet Theatre.
