= R. M. J. Kenner =

19th century Louisiana state representative

Richard M. J. Kenner was a state legislator in Louisiana. He served in the Louisiana House of Representatives. He attended a Republican ratification meeting in Congo Square in 1868.

Kenner was from the Fourth District. He was removed as ward superintendent in August 1870. In 1871 he served on a House Committee on Elections that found in favor of Frank Alexander over Benjamin Buchanan in a disputed election.

In 1879 he was reported to be a clerk in a Naval office.

He and his wife, Dulease V. Kenner, adopted Fannie Hutton in 1874 and her name was changed to Fannie Justine Kenner.
