= Lynne Taylor-Corbett =

American choreographer and director (1946–2025)

- Born: Lynne Aileen Taylor; December 2, 1946; Denver, Colorado, U.S.
- Died: January 12, 2025 (aged 78); Rockville Centre, New York, U.S.
- Occupations: Choreographer; director; lyricist
- Spouse: Michael Corbett (div. 1983)
- Children: Shaun Taylor-Corbett

Lynne Aileen Taylor-Corbett (December 2, 1946 – January 12, 2025) was an American choreographer, director, lyricist and composer.

== Life and career ==
Lynne Taylor-Corbett was born in Denver, Colorado on December 2, 1946. She grew up in the area and attended Littleton High School. She gained her first exposure to dance through her mother, a pianist for ballet classes.

She left Colorado for New York City at the age of 17, where she initially found work as an usher at the New York State Theater (renamed the David H. Koch Theater in 2011), home of the New York City Ballet, shortly before joining the Alvin Ailey American Dance Theater, where later in her choreographic career as part of the company's Women's Choreography Initiative, she would create her ballet Prayers from the Edge, inspired by her experiences and observations while touring with the Ailey company, particularly of performing in the Middle East and Africa following the Six-Day Arab-Israeli War in 1967. She also danced and choreographed for a small ensemble, The Dance Theatre Collection, where her work garnered enough attention to draw increasingly prestigious commissions through the 1970s and into the 1980s, including from Mikhail Baryshnikov during his tenure as artistic director at American Ballet Theatre.

She worked in theatre and film (most notably, creating the choreography for the dance classic Footloose (1984)), and also choreographed for dance companies, both ballet and modern, and was the principal guest choreographer for Carolina Ballet. She choreographed the dance Great Galloping Gottschalk (set to music of Louis Moreau Gottschalk) for the American Ballet Theatre, which premiered the work in Miami in January 1982.

Taylor-Corbett was nominated for the 2000 Tony Award, Best Direction of a Musical and Best Choreography for the musical Swing! and also received a 2000 Drama Desk Award nomination for Outstanding Choreography. Her recent stage work includes both directing and choreographing the musical My Vaudeville Man!, which ran off-Broadway at the York Theatre Company from November 2008 through January 2009. She received a Drama Desk Award nomination for Outstanding Choreography with her collaborator, Shonn Wiley, for My Vaudeville Man!.

Taylor Corbett created some of her most inspiring choreography on Carolina Ballet. She worked with the company extensively for 10 years and developed deep knowledge of the strengths of the Carolina Ballet dancers. Lynne also familiarized herself with the North Carolina Triangle region. In North Carolina, Lynne was most recognized for her lively crowd pleasing "Carolina Jamboree", featuring music by the Red Clay Ramblers, a North Carolinian blue grass band. During the live performances of Carolina Jamboree, the Red Clay Ramblers are integrated with the professional dancers. Lynne wanted local music to be the soul of her work in Carolina Jamboree and this is clearly presented by having the live band elevated on stage with the dancers. The intermissions of the piece are even choreographed balletically and musically. The Red Clay Ramblers play interludes with active audience and dancer participation. Carolina Ballet received rave reviews for its revival of Carolina Jamboree in 2013, both at the Raleigh Memorial Auditorium and at the Durham Performing Arts Center (DPAC). The ballet choreography in Carolina Jamboree evokes lively folk dancing shown through several solos, pas de deuxs, and group dances. The "Red Rocking Chair" female solo is deeply moving in its depiction of a mother who has lost her newborn. Lynne's Taylor Corbett's work in Carolina Jamboree carries a strong sense of nationalism towards American dance. The ballet is split into three acts. The first: "Appalachia Stories," the second: "The Mystery of Nell Cropsey," and the third: "Fiddlesticks." All three sections touch on the hardships of the Great Depression and the joys of overcoming such hard times. Carolina Jamboree is a true testament to Lynne's Taylor-Corbett's talent. The piece showcases dancers abilities both technically and emotionally and it is a joy to view as an audience member.

The Stage Directors and Choreographers Society announced that Lynne Taylor-Corbett is the recipient of the 2008 Joseph A. Callaway Award for excellence in stage directing and choreography.

She was married to Michael Corbett, and divorced in 1983. Her son, Shaun Taylor-Corbett, appeared in the children's series Hi-5 which aired on the Learning Channel. He has appeared in the off-Broadway show Altar Boyz, and in the production of In The Heights on Broadway.

Taylor-Corbett died of breast cancer at a hospital in Rockville Centre, New York on January 12, 2025, at the age of 78.

== Selected stage works (choreographer) ==
- Wanda's World – 2008 (also directed)
- Swing! – 1999 (also directed)
- Titanic – 1997
- The Fields of Ambrosia - 1993
- Chess – 1988
- Shakespeare's Cabaret – 1981

== Ballet/dance ==
- Bolero, Carolina Ballet, 2018
- Dracula, Carolina Ballet, 2010
- Monet Impressions Carolina Ballet, 2007
- Carmina Burana, Carolina Ballet, 2000
- Chiaroscuro, New York City Ballet Diamond Project II, 1994
- Mercury, New York City Ballet Diamond Project, 1992
- Estuary, ABT, Miami Beach Theater of the Performing Arts, 1983
- Great Galloping Gottschalk, ABT, Miami Beach Theater of the Performing Arts, 1982

== See also ==
- Choreography on Broadway
