= Skip to My Lou =

Children's song

Song
- Genre: Folk
- Songwriter: Traditional

Audio sample
- "Skip to My Lou" as performed by the United States Air Force Band's Singing Sergeants: file; help

"Skip to My (The) Lou" (Roud 3433 and 3593) is a popular American folk song and partner-stealing dance from the 1840s.

Carl Sandburg, poet and biographer of President Abraham Lincoln, writes that "Skip-to-my-Lou" was a popular party game in Lincoln's youth in southern Indiana, with verses such as "Hurry up slow poke, do oh do", "I'll get her back in spite of you", "Gone again, what shall I do", and "I'll get another girl sweeter than you".

John A. and Alan Lomax wrote that "Skip to My Lou" was a simple game of stealing partners (or swapping partners as in square dancing). It begins with any number of couples skipping hand in hand around in a ring. A lone boy in the center of the moving circle of couples sings, "Lost my partner, what'll I do?" as the girls whirl past him. The young man in the center hesitates while he decides which girl to choose, singing, "I'll get another one just like you." When he grasps the hand of his chosen one, the latter's partner moves to the center of the ring. It is an ice-breaker, providing an opportunity for the participants to get acquainted with one another and to get into a good mood. "Skip to My Lou" is number 3433 and 3593 in the Roud Folk Song Index.

S. Frederick Starr suggests that the song may be derived from the Creole folksong "Lolotte Pov'piti Lolotte", to which it has a strong resemblance. See also "La Savane", a composition by Louis Moreau Gottschalk which is based on the Creole song.

The "lou" in the title comes from the word "loo", a Scottish word for "love".

== Uses ==
"Skip to My Lou" was featured in the 1944 film Meet Me in St. Louis. Sections of the song arranged by Hugh Martin and Ralph Blane are sung to the tunes of "Kingdom Coming" and "Yankee Doodle". In the 1951 film Across the Wide Missouri it is sung by Clark Gable (while he plays a Jew's Harp) and others throughout the movie. In the classic Western The Searchers (1956), Charlie McCorry (Ken Curtis) uses the song to serenade Laurie Jorgensen (Vera Miles). In the film Pee Wee's Big Adventure (1985), Pee Wee is slowly driven to distraction by an old man riding in a box car, who will not stop singing verse after verse of the song.

The song has been recorded by various artists including Lead Belly, Pete Seeger, Judy Garland, Nat King Cole, Elizabeth Mitchell, The Blue Sky Boys, Dickie Bishop and His Sidekicks, and Dale Warland Singers, among others. The song remains a favorite piece of various classic choirs, with a popular arrangement by Paul Busselberg.

In the Thomas & Friends fourth series episode "Peter Sam & The Refreshment Lady", Peter Sam sings "I'm Peter Sam, I'm running this line," which has a similar melody.

The song is mentioned and referred to a number of times in Stephen King's horror book The Shining.

== Lyrics ==
=== Common version ===
Skip, skip, skip to my Lou, (3x)
Skip to my Lou, my darlin'.

[Changing verse] (3×)
Skip to my Lou, my darlin'.

The changing verse:

- Fly in the buttermilk, shoo, fly, shoo.
- There's a little red wagon, paint it blue.
- I lost my partner, what'll I do?
- I'll get another, as pretty as you
- Can't get a red bird, jay bird'll do.
- Cat's in the cream jar, ooh, ooh, ooh.
- Off to Texas, two by two.
- Lou, Lou, skip to my Lou.

=== Another version ===
Fly in the buttermilk, Shoo fly, shoo, shoo! (3×)
Skip to my Lou, my darling! (repeat 1×)
Lou, Lou skip to my Lou! (3×)
Skip to my Lou, my darling.

Cows in the pasture two by two! (3×)
Skip to my Lou, my darling! (repeat 1×)
Lou, Lou skip to my Lou, (3×)
Skip to my Lou, my darling.

(sound sad) Lost my partner, What'll I do? (3×)
Skip to my Lou, my darling! (repeat 1×)
Lou, Lou skip to my Lou, (3×)
Skip to my Lou, my darling.

(sound happy) I'll find another one better than you! (3×)
Skip to my Lou, my darling!

Found my partner love is true! (3×)
Skip to my Lou, my darling!
Lou, Lou skip to my Lou! (3×)
Skip to my Lou, my darling.
