= Charles Hubert Millevoye =

French poet

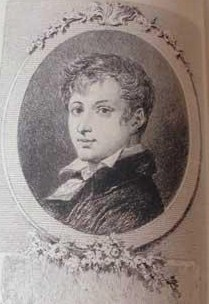
Depiction of Millevoye.

Charles Hubert Millevoye (24 December 1782 in Abbeville – 12 August 1816 in Paris) was a French poet several times honored by the Académie Française. He was a transitional figure between the eighteenth and the nineteenth centuries as revealed in his Romantic poems. His poem beginning "Dans les bois l'amoureux Myrtil" (La Fauvette) is also well known as set to music in Vieille Chanson by Georges Bizet, as well as Le Mancenillier, as referred to in Meyerbeer's L'Africaine and Louis Moreau Gottschalk's serenade for piano Le Mancenillier, Op. 11.

== Life ==
First taught by an uncle, he later studied with M. Bardoux, a professor in the College of Abbeville. His father died when he was 13 years old, and he was then sent by his family to Paris to finish his education. He began to study law, then became a bookseller, but finally abandoned both to commit himself to writing.

Millevoye married Margaret Flora Delattre on 31 August 1813 in Abbeville and only had one child, Charles Alfred (1813–1891), who served as magistrate in charge of the judicial organization of Savoie in 1860. Of his marriage with Irma Malvina Leclerc-Thouin on 7 June 1845 in Paris, Charles Alfred had three sons, of which Lucien Millevoye (1850–1918) was a Member of Parliament from Amiens from 1882 to 1893, from Paris from 1898 to 1918, and director of the newspaper La Patrie.

== Works ==
Millevoye in his time was well known for his poetry, which was a mixture of classical reminiscences and sentimental style. Literary critic Charles Augustin Sainte-Beuve writes the following about him: "Between Delille who completes and Lamartine who preludes, […] a pale and soft star shone for a moment: it is he." (Note: French original: "Entre Delille qui finit et Lamartine qui prélude, […] une pâle et douce étoile un moment a brillé; c’est lui.") Millevoye mainly wrote elegies, of which La Chute des Feuilles (The Fall of the Leaves) is one of the most famous. Besides his poems, Millevoye also made fresh translations of the Iliad, the Bucolica of Virgil and some dialogues of Lucian of Samosata. He died at the age of 34. His complete works appeared ten years later, in 1826.
