= Op. 11 =

In music, Op. 11 stands for Opus number 11. Compositions that are assigned this number include:

- Barber – Adagio for Strings
- Barber – String Quartet
- Beethoven – Piano Trio, Op. 11
- Boccherini – String Quintet in E major, Op. 11, No. 5
- Brahms – Serenade No. 1
- Chopin – Piano Concerto No. 1
- Dvořák – Romance in F minor
- Elgar – Sursum corda
- Enescu – Romanian Rhapsodies
- Fanny Hensel – Piano Trio
- Gottschalk – Le Mancenillier
- Granados – Goyescas
- Grieg – In Autumn
- Hindemith – Viola Sonata No. 1
- Hindemith – Violin Sonata No. 2
- Karłowicz – Lithuanian Rhapsody
- Mendelssohn – Symphony No. 1
- Prokofiev – Toccata
- Racine – Cantique de Jean Racine
- Schoenberg – Drei Klavierstücke
- Schumann – Piano Sonata No. 1
- Scriabin – 24 Preludes, Op. 11
- Sibelius – Karelia Suite, for orchestra (1893)
- Siegfried Wagner – An allem ist Hütchen schuld!
- Spohr – String Quartet No. 3
- Stamitz – Symphony in E-flat major, Op. 11, No. 3
- Stanford – Violin Sonata No. 1
- Strauss – Horn Concerto No. 1
- Tchaikovsky – String Quartet No. 1
- Vivaldi – Six Concertos, Op. 11
- Zemlinsky – Der Traumgörge
