= Richard Jackson (musicologist) =

Richard Hammel Jackson (born February 15, 1936), is an American musicologist and music librarian. He specializes in 19th and early 20th century American classical and popular music.

== Life and career ==
Born in New Orleans, Jackson studied the organ at Loyola University New Orleans where he graduated with a Bachelor of Music in 1958. He began his career as a librarian soon after, working for the New Orleans Public Library in 1958–1959. He then pursued graduate studies in musicology at Tulane University; there earning his MA in 1962. While a student, he worked for the Maxwell Music Library at Newcomb College, Tulane University from 1959 to 1962.

Jackson moved to New York and worked as a librarian for The New School for Social Research from 1962 to 1965. He studied library science at the Pratt Institute in Brooklynn where he graduated with a Master of Science in Library Science in 1968.

From 1965 to 1991 Jackson served as the head of the Americana Collection in the music division of the New York Public Library. During his tenure he prepared several notable exhibitions on a variety of subjects, including exhibitions on the New York Philharmonic and on composers Aaron Copland, Elliott Carter, and Louis Moreau Gottschalk. His work at the New York Public Library intersected with his interests and publications in the area of musicology. He was the editor of a 1973 publication of the collected works of Gottschalk's piano music, and a year earlier had served as an editorial consultant for the collected piano works of Scott Joplin. He was also the editor of a 1974 collection of Stephen Foster’s songs. He was the author of the anthology Popular Songs of 19th-Century America (1976), and co-edited The Little Book of Louis Moreau Gottschalk (1976). From 1967 to 1991 he was the associate editor of the journal American Choral Review. His other published works included multiple journal articles and two bibliographies of American music (1973, 1977).

Jackson lives in retirement in Louisiana.
