= New Orleans Jazz National Historical Park =

National Historical Park of the United States

- U.S. National Register of Historic Places
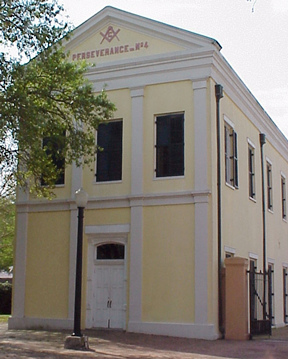
- Perseverance Hall No. 4

- Location within East New Orleans Location within Louisiana Location within the United States
- Location: New Orleans, Louisiana, United States
- Coordinates: 29°57′47″N 90°4′5″W
- Area: 4 acres (0.016 km^{2})
- Visitation: 51,065 (2025)
- Website: New Orleans Jazz National Historical Park
- NRHP reference No.: 01000277
- Added to NRHP: October 2, 1973

New Orleans Jazz National Historical Park is a U.S. National Historical Park in the Tremé neighborhood of New Orleans, near the French Quarter. It was created in 1994 to celebrate the origins and evolution of jazz.

Most of the historical park property consists of 4 acres (16,000 m^{2}) within Louis Armstrong Park leased by the National Park Service. There is a visitor center at 916 North Peters Street and a concert venue, several blocks away in the French Quarter. The Park provides a setting for sharing the cultural history of the people and places which helped to shape the development and progression of jazz in New Orleans. National Park Service staff present information and resources associated with the origins and early development of jazz, through interpretive techniques designed to educate and entertain.

== Perseverance Hall No. 4 ==
The centerpiece of the site is Perseverance Hall No. 4. Originally a Masonic Lodge, it was built between 1819 and 1820, making it the oldest Masonic temple in Louisiana.

Perseverance Hall was listed on the National Register of Historic Places on October 2, 1973. The entire National Historical Park was administratively listed on the Register on the date of its authorization, October 31, 1994.

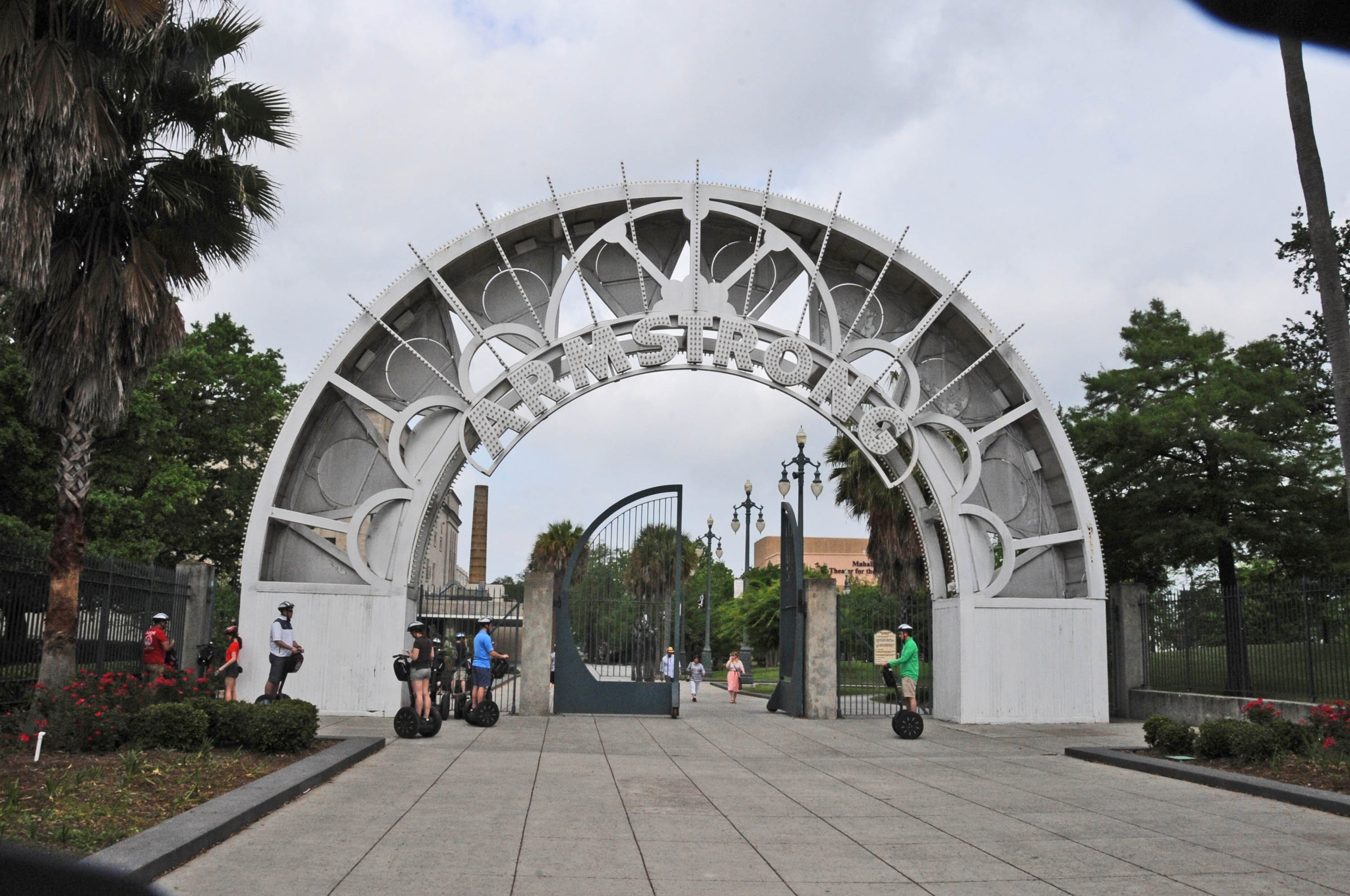
Entrance to Louis Armstrong Park

== See also ==
- Jean Lafitte National Historical Park and Preserve, with some of its constituent properties located in or near New Orleans
- New Orleans Jazz Museum
