= Louis Armstrong Park (New Orleans) =

Park in New Orleans, Louisiana, U.S.

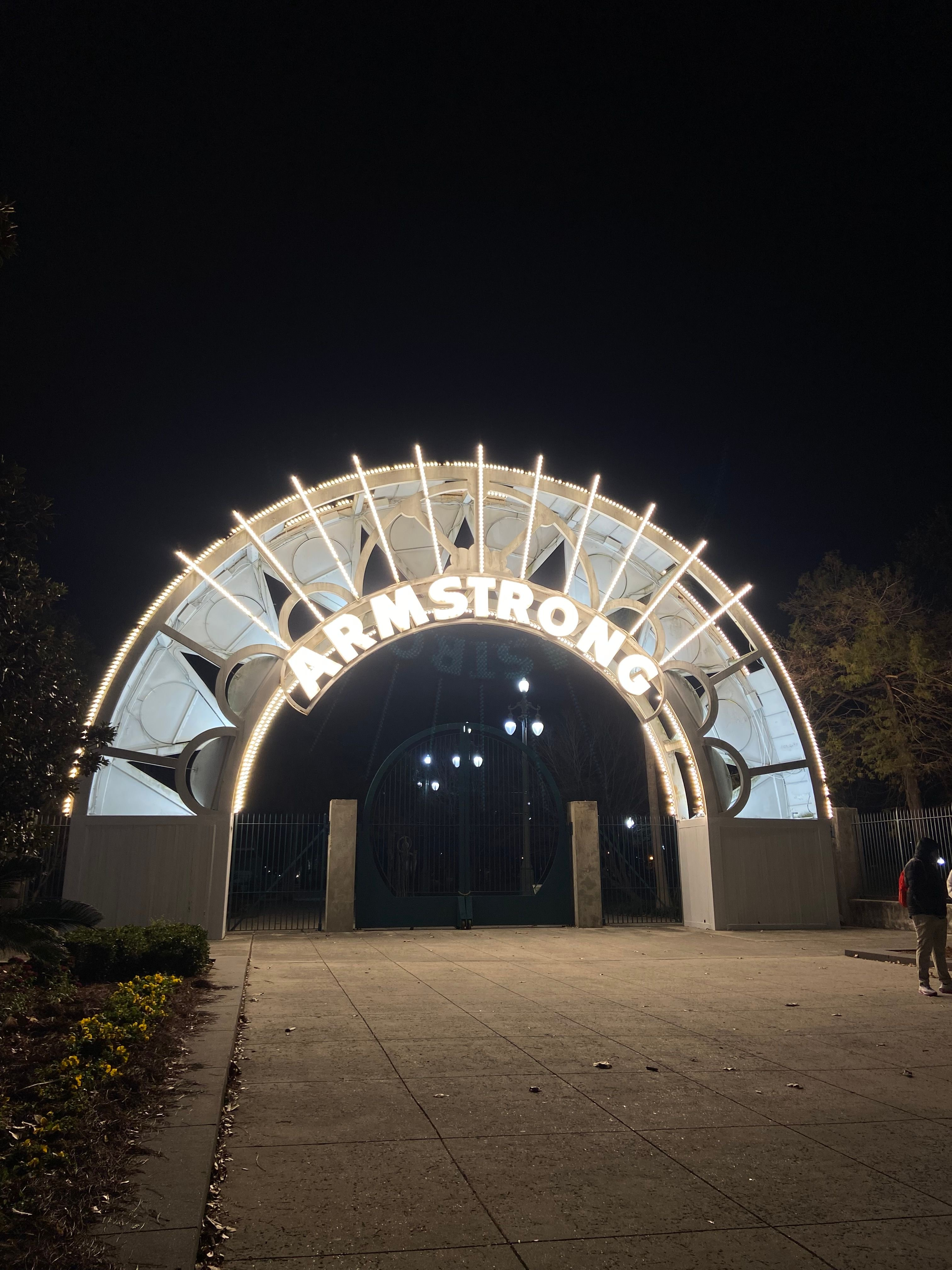
- Interactive map of Louis Armstrong Park
- Type: Urban park
- Location: New Orleans
- Coordinates: 29°57′46″N 90°4′4″W
- Area: 32 acres (13 ha)
- Public transit: N. Rampart St. at St. Ann St. (buses and streetcar)
- Website: City of New Orleans webpage

Louis Armstrong Park is a 32-acre (130,000 m^{2}) park located in the Tremé neighborhood of New Orleans, Louisiana, just across Rampart Street from the French Quarter.

In the 1960s a controversial urban renewal project leveled a substantial portion of the Tremé neighborhood adjacent to Congo Square. After a decade of debate, the City created the present-day park from that land. This park was designed by New Orleans architect Robin Riley and was named after New Orleans-born Jazz legend Louis Armstrong.

The footprint of the present-day park contains the New Orleans Municipal Auditorium, the Mahalia Jackson Theater for the Performing Arts and several buildings owned by the New Orleans Jazz National Historical Park. The portion of the park immediately in front of the New Orleans Municipal Auditorium is the site of Congo Square, formerly known as Beauregard Square, famous for its role in the history of African American music and spiritual practice.

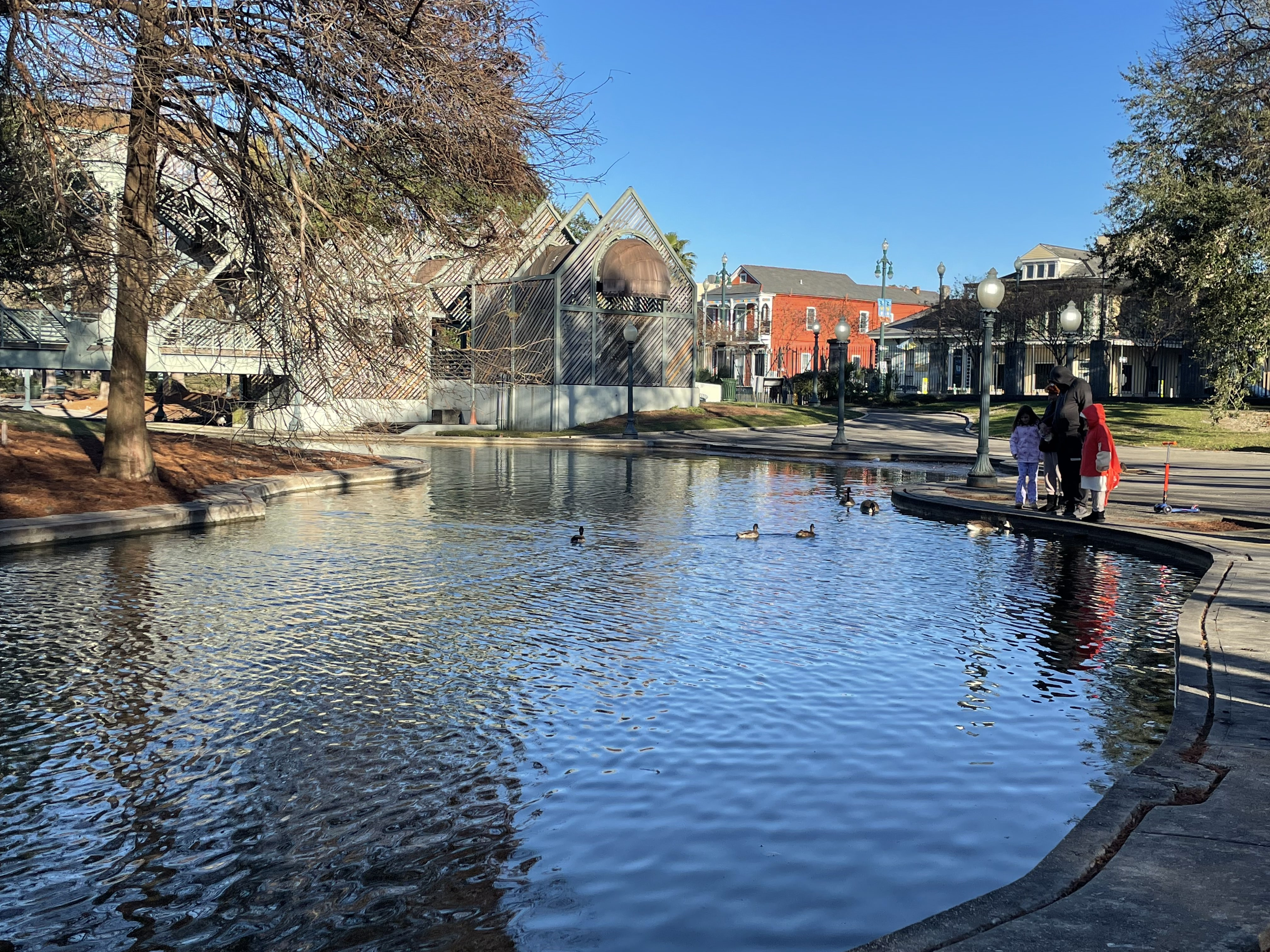
A pond at the park, facing Rampart Street

Some elements of the park's design have been subject to critique throughout the years. Residents of the adjacent Tremé and French Quarter neighborhoods have called for the removal of the large fence that separates the park from surrounding areas and for incorporating the large concrete parking lots in the rear of the park into the park's greenspace The presence of these parking lots are often attributed to high rates of subsidence and flooding along N. Villere Street.

Louis Armstrong Park was home to the first New Orleans Jazz & Heritage Festival in 1970. While that festival has moved to the larger space of New Orleans Fairgrounds, Armstrong Park has more recently been the home of many other events, including the "Jazz in the Park" free concert series, the Treme Creole Gumbo Fest, and the Louisiana Cajun & Zydeco Festival.

Monuments include a 12-foot statue of Louis Armstrong. by Elizabeth Catlett, a bust of Sidney Bechet, and a depiction of Buddy Bolden.
