= Le Mancenillier (Gottschalk) =

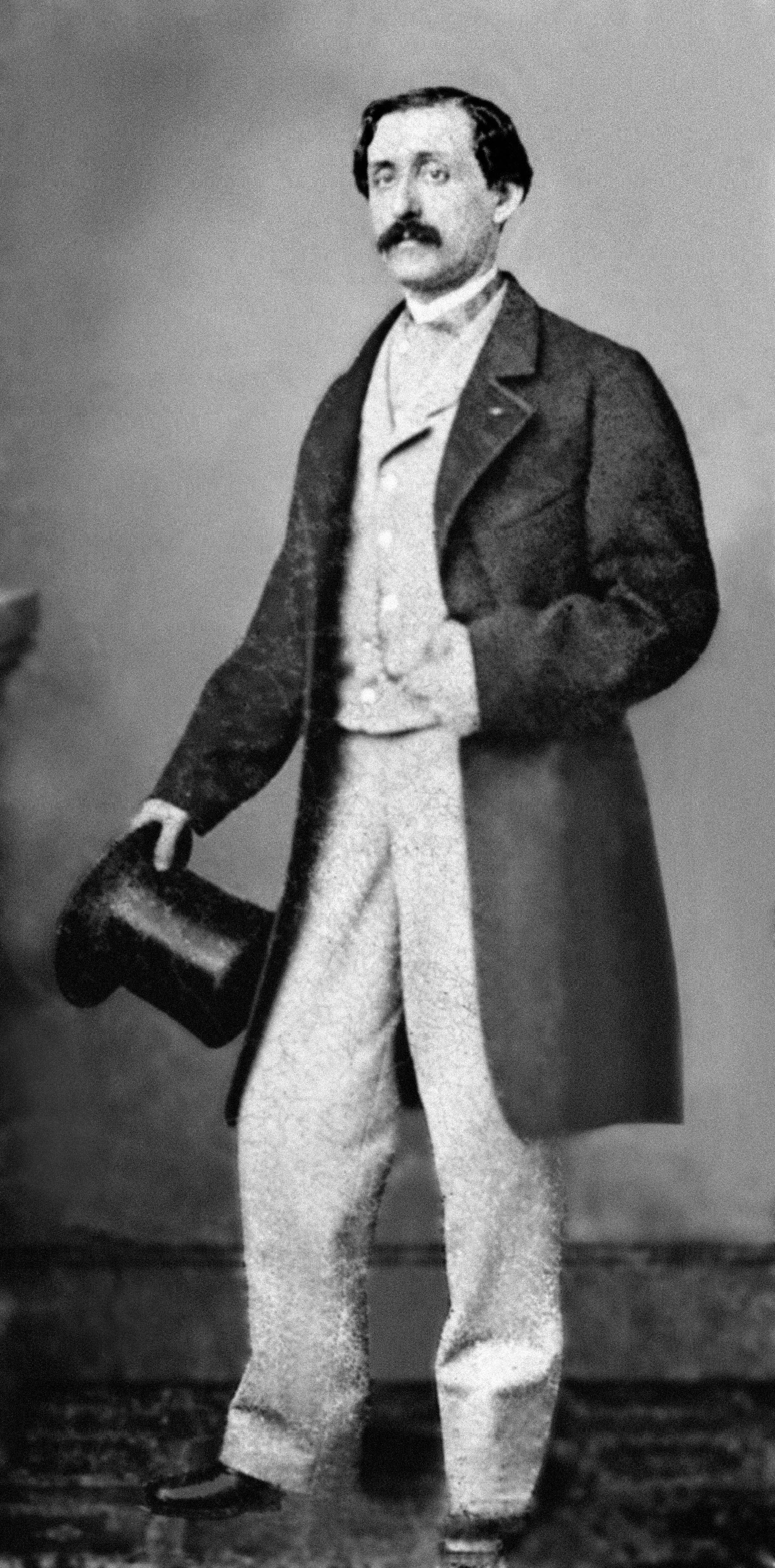
Photo of Louis Moreau Gottschalk

Le Mancenillier, Op. 11, is a Creole-based composition for piano written by American composer Louis Moreau Gottschalk in Switzerland in the fall of 1848. Dedicated to "Madame Mennechet de Barival", it was published in Paris with the subtitle Sérénade by his publisher 'Escudiers' in April 1851. It is the fourth and last piece dubbed by musicologist Gilbert Chase the Louisiana Trilogy, written between 1844 and 1846 when Gottschalk had not yet come of age.

== Musical analysis ==
Based on a Saint-Domingue's eight-bar folk tune titled Chanson de Lizette, the Creole melody Ou som souroucou and either Louisiana's Ma mourri or Martinique's Tant sirop est doux, its title refers to the manchineel, a tree from the tropics which grows poisonous small apple-like fruits. It can't be burned for the smoke might cause blindness and one standing beneath its branches during a rainfall might have the skin blistered by its sap. It's a composition certainly based on a poem of the same name by Charles Hubert Millevoye.

Although Gottschalk called the piece a "serenade", it was written as a ballad in the ABA form. With 238 bars and a 92 bpm Andante tempo marked as malinconico, it has a 2/2 time signature. The introductory melody is established under a staccato accompaniment on the left hand with the middle section marked by the contrasts of the staccato rhythm of left hand over the melodic phrases of the right, followed by a series of modulations. The third motif in B♭ comes with a fortissimo shift of the melody, followed by a long coda with light variations in triplets in the final bars.
