= Municipal Auditorium (New Orleans) =

Arena in Louisiana, United States

Morris F.X. Jeff, Sr. Municipal Auditorium
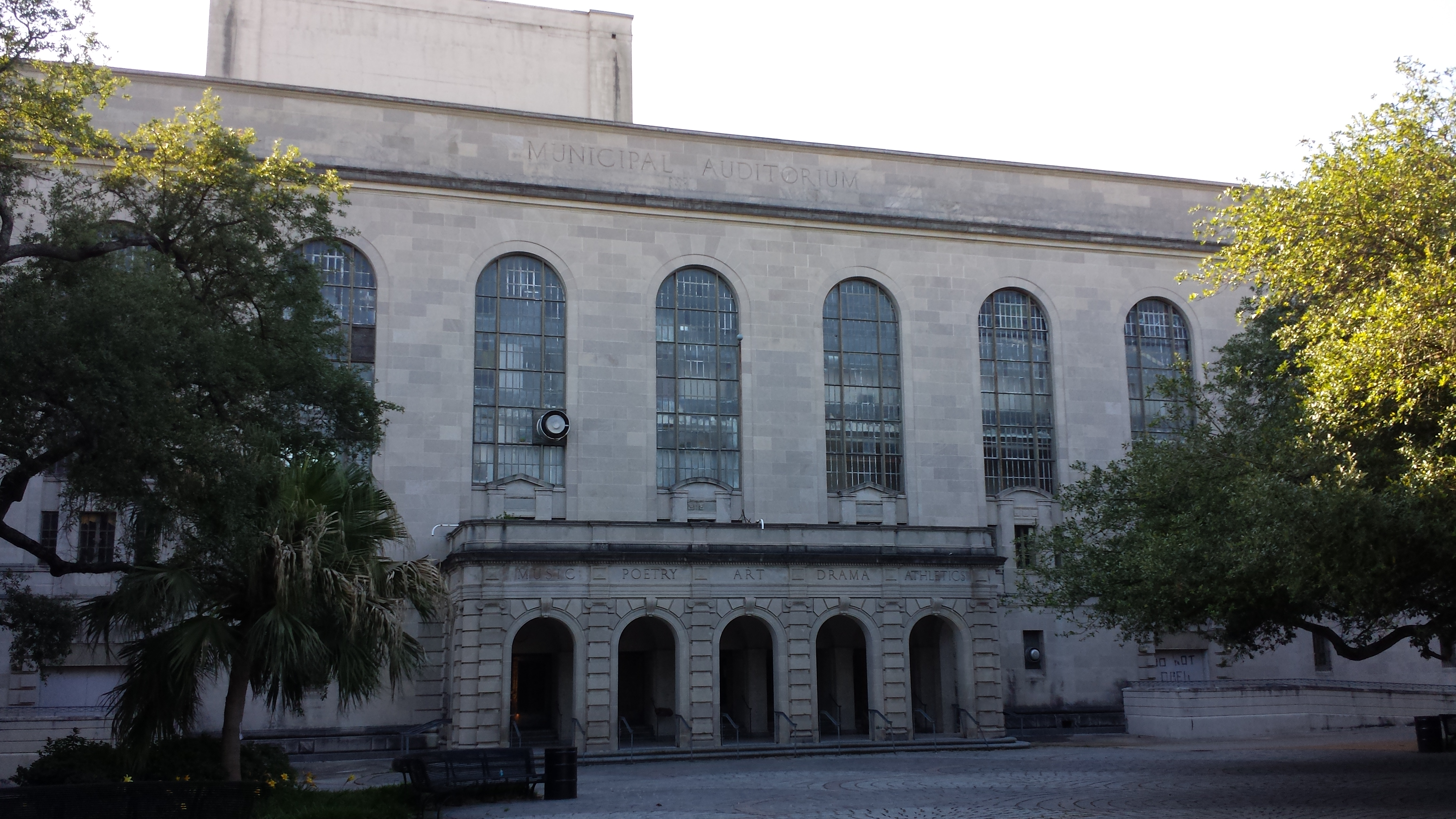
- Interactive map of Morris F.X. Jeff, Sr. Municipal Auditorium
- Location: 1201 St. Peter Street; New Orleans, Louisiana 70116
- Coordinates: 29°57′41″N 90°4′9″W
- Owner: City of New Orleans
- Operator: City of New Orleans
- Capacity: 7,853

Construction
- Opened: May 30, 1930
- Cost: US$2 million
- General contractor: George A. Caldwell

Tenants
- New Orleans Buccaneers (ABA) (1969–1970); New Orleans Jazz (NBA) (1974–1975); New Orleans Brass (ECHL) (1997–1999)

The Municipal Auditorium is an abandoned multi-purpose arena in New Orleans, Louisiana, and a component of the New Orleans Cultural Center, alongside the Mahalia Jackson Theater of the Performing Arts. It is located in the Tremé neighborhood in Louis Armstrong Park adjacent to Congo Square.

== History ==
The auditorium opened on May 30, 1930. It was designed by Favrot and Livaudais Architects, and constructed by contractor George A. Caldwell. It has hosted many concerts and events, perhaps being best known as the site of many of the New Orleans Mardi Gras krewe balls.

On August 24, 1956, Joe Brown defeated Wallace “Bud” Smith to win the lightweight title in a fifteen-round split decision.

It hosted the New Orleans Buccaneers of the American Basketball Association during the 1969–70 season. It also hosted the New Orleans Jazz basketball team, during its inaugural 1974–1975 season, before the team moved to the Louisiana Superdome. The arena was also home ice to the minor-league hockey franchise, the New Orleans Brass, from 1997 to 1999, before they moved into the New Orleans Arena. It has also hosted LHSAA wrestling and professional wrestling matches. On October 29, 1988, the Road Warriors defeated the Midnight Express (professional wrestling) to win the NWA World Tag Team titles at the auditorium.

In 1994, the Municipal Auditorium was officially renamed the Morris F.X. Jeff Auditorium in honor of the creator of many of local recreational programs for Black children during the Jim Crow era.

The venue was a temporary casino before the new Harrah's New Orleans building on Canal Street was opened in 1999.

In August 2005 the auditorium suffered damage from Hurricane Katrina and associated flooding (see: Effect of Hurricane Katrina on New Orleans). Future usage of the arena is currently uncertain. As of 2024, redevelopment to reopen the auditorium has not yet begun.

== Gallery ==
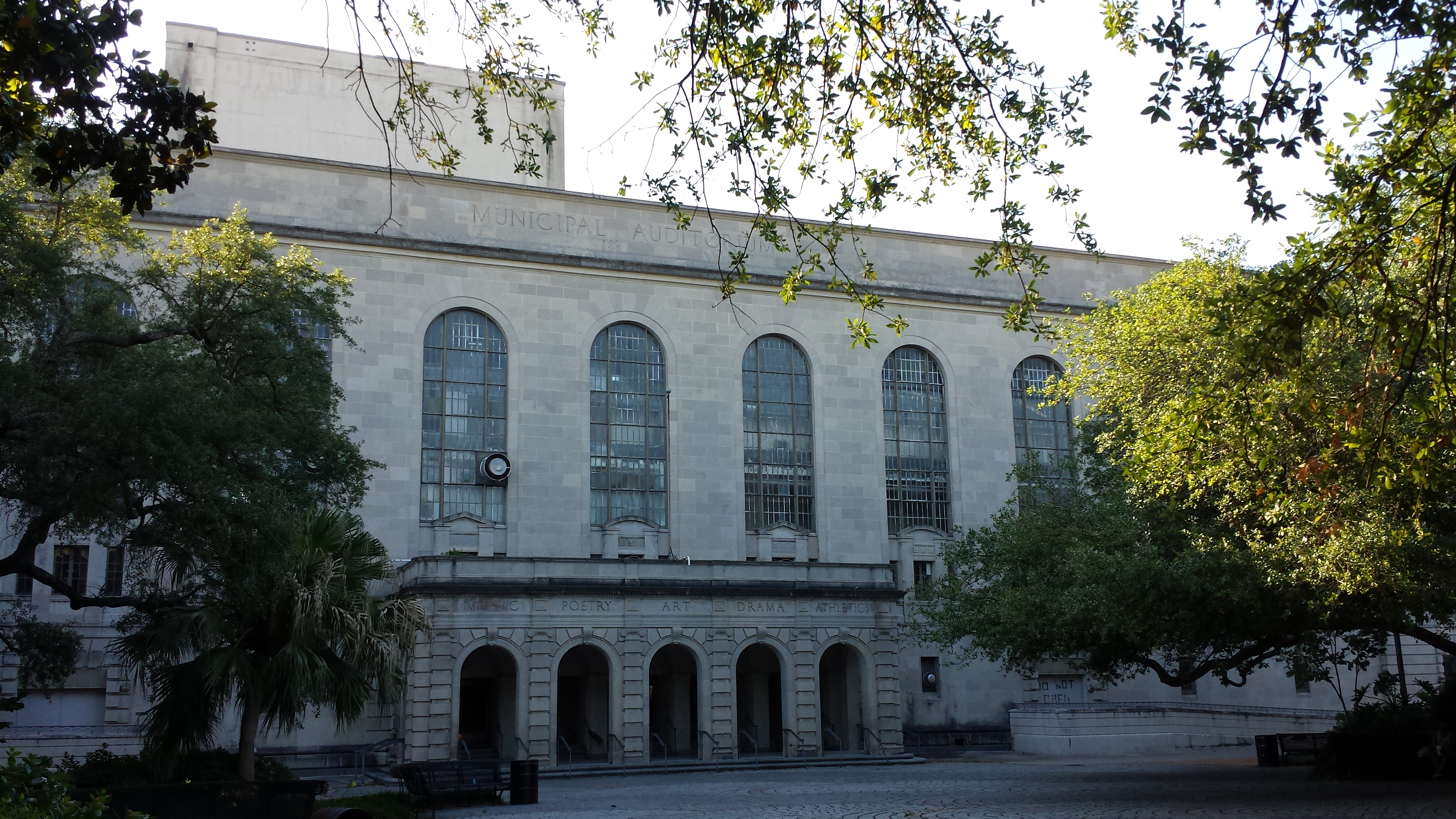
Municipal Auditorium – Congo Square

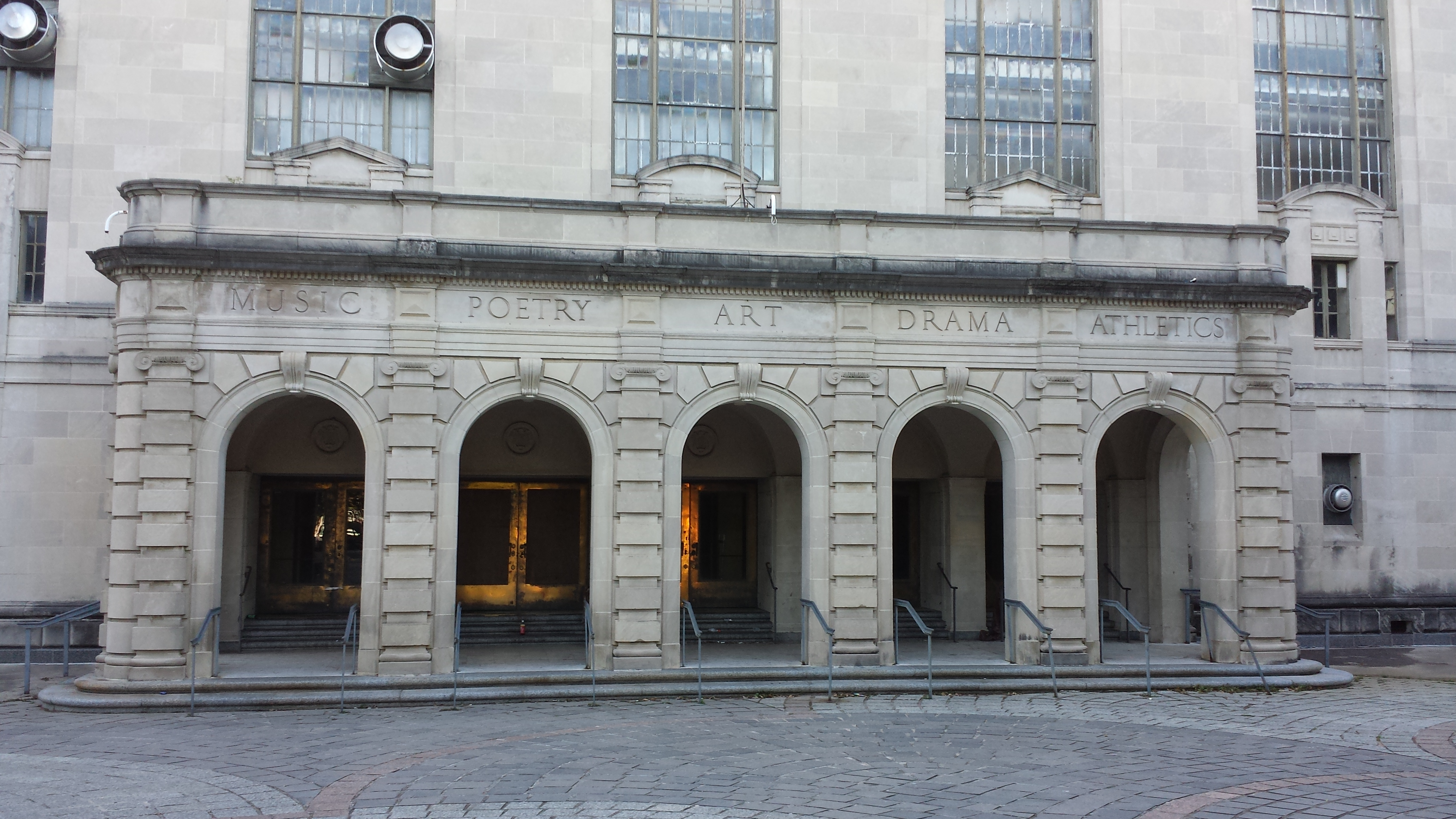
Municipal Auditorium – Congo Square Entrance

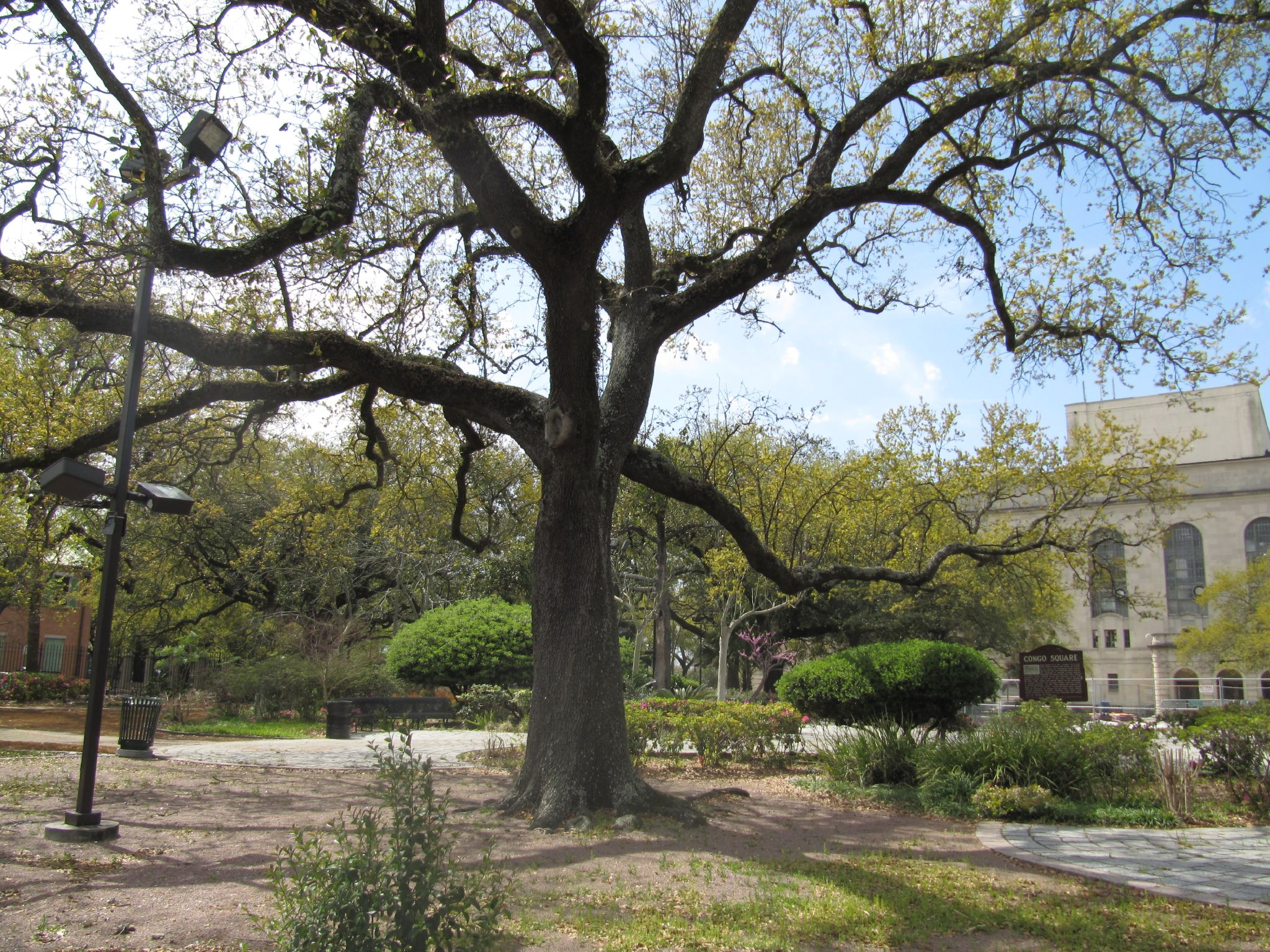
Municipal Auditorium and Congo Square

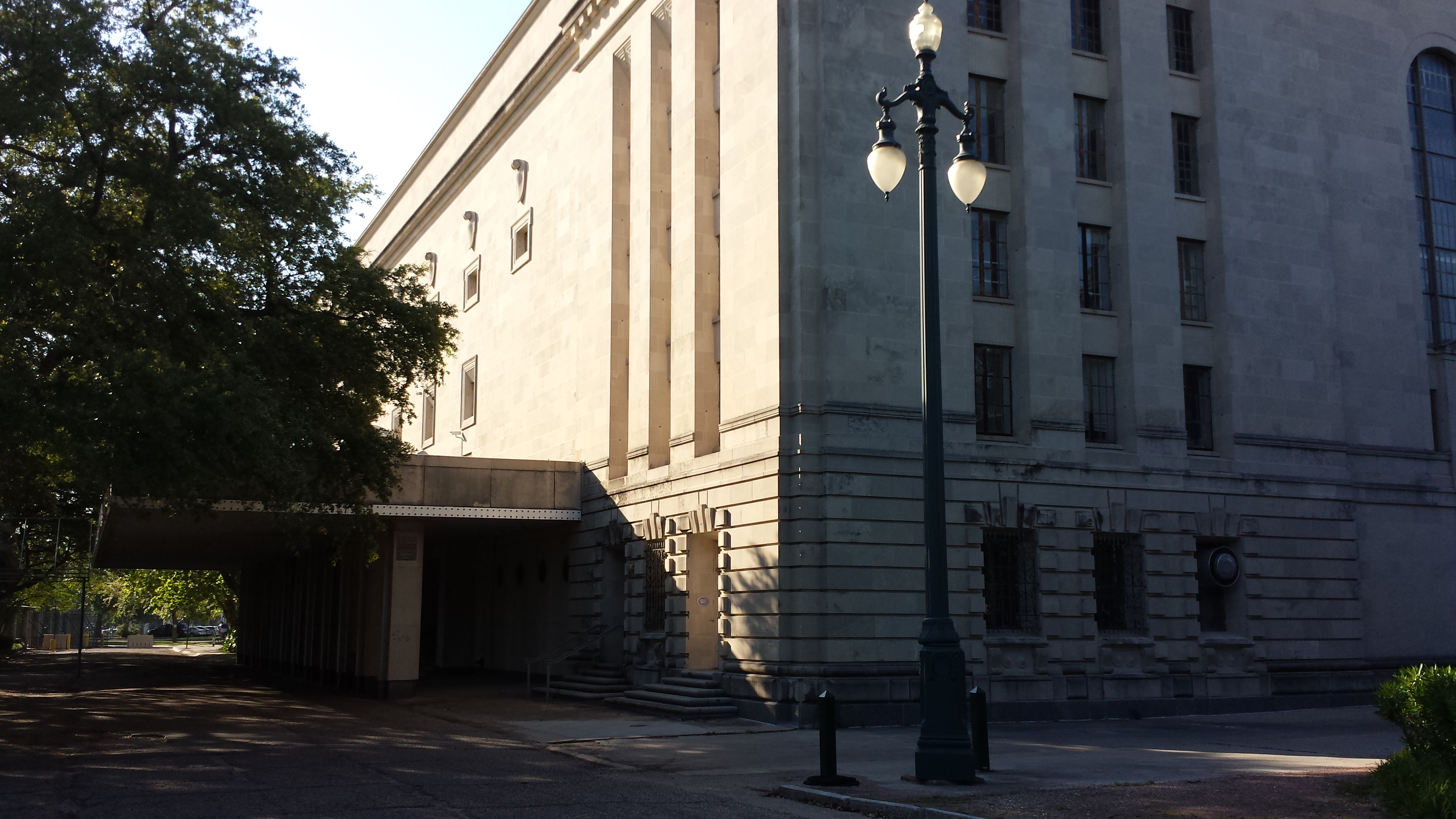
Municipal Auditorium – Basin Street Entrance

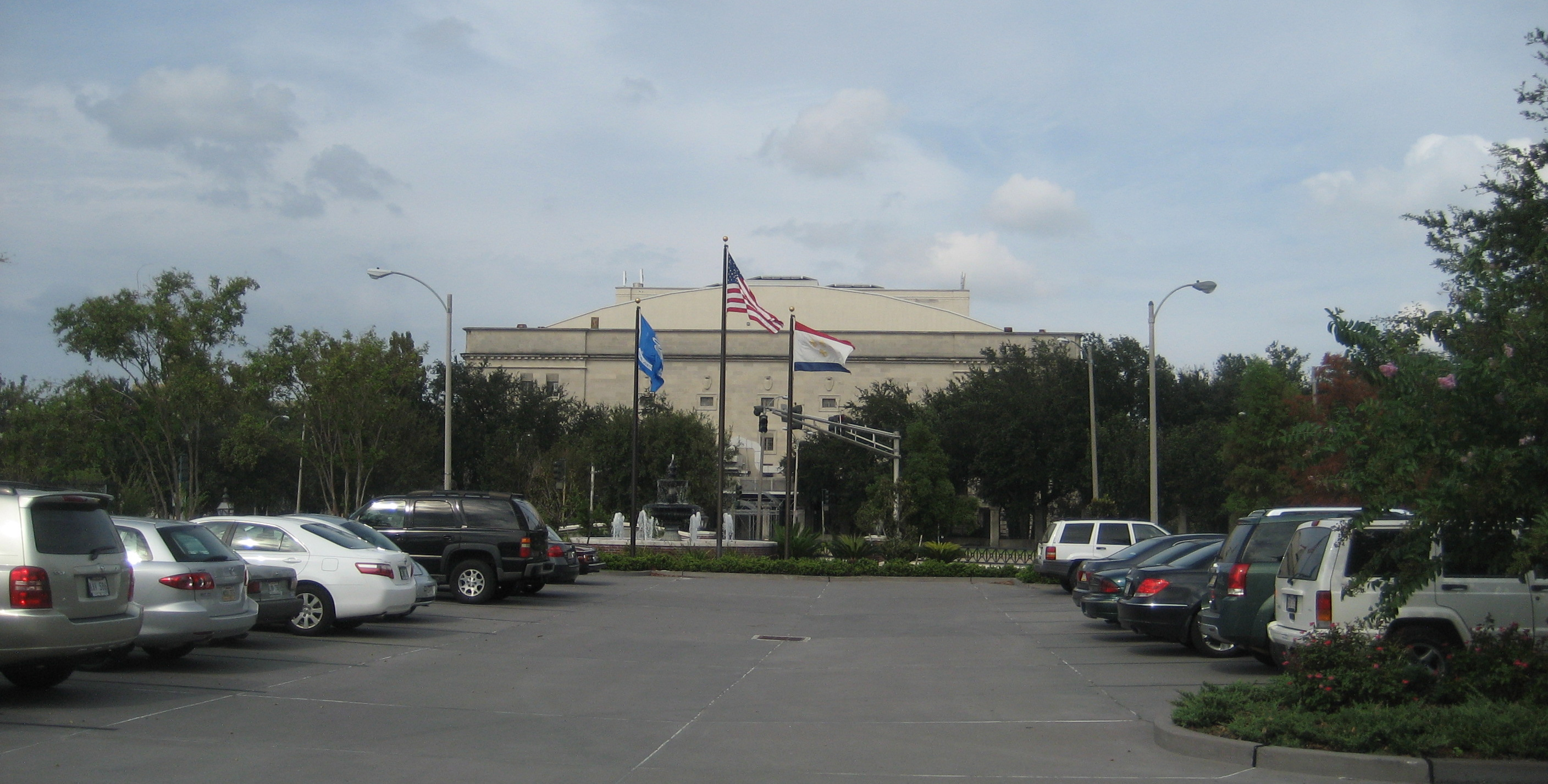
Municipal Auditorium – Basin Street

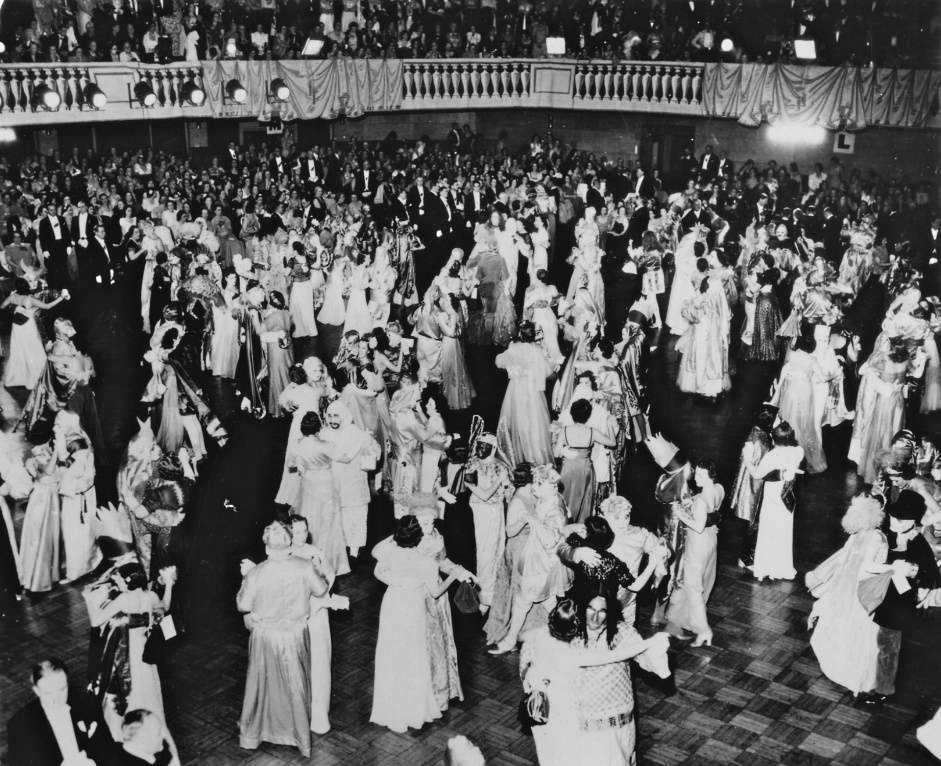
1930's Mardi Gras Ball in the Municipal Auditorium

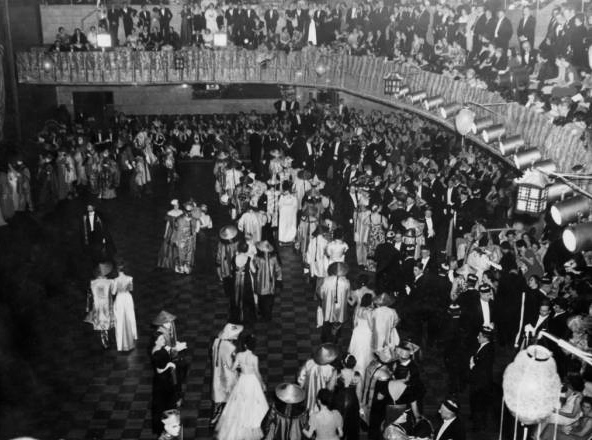
Prometheus Mardi Gras Ball in the Municipal Auditorium in 1939

== See also ==
- List of convention centers in the United States
- List of music venues
- Theater in Louisiana

Preceded by first arena	Home of the New Orleans Jazz; 1974 – 1975	Succeeded by Louisiana Superdome
