= Bamboula (Gottschalk) =

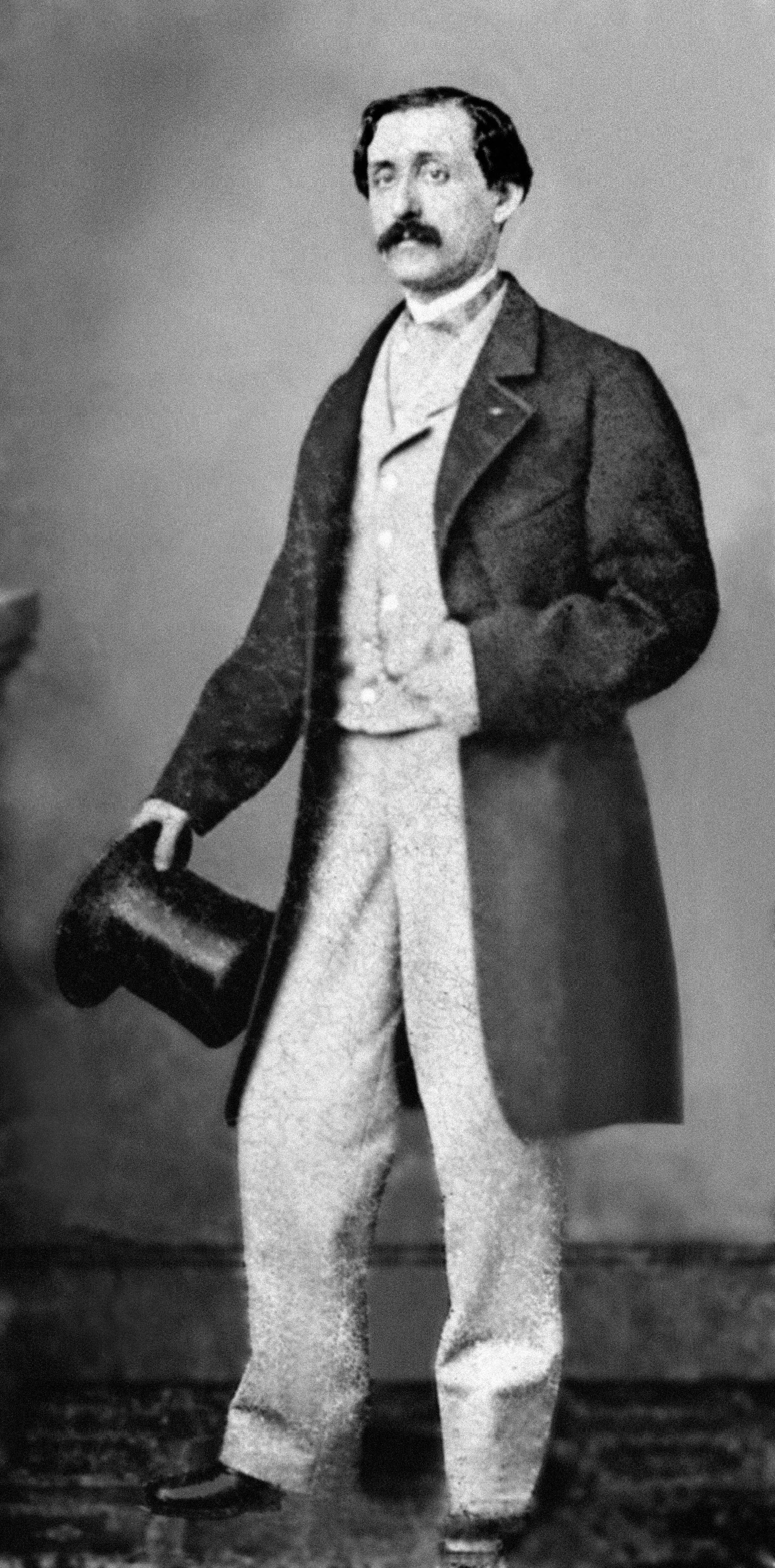
Photo of Louis Moreau Gottschalk

Bamboula, Op. 2, is a fantasy for piano written by American composer Louis Moreau Gottschalk while he was delirious with typhoid fever in the French town of Clermont-sur-l'Oise in the summer of 1848. Dedicated "à sa Majesté Isabelle II, Reine des Espagnes", it is the first of the so-called set of four "Louisiana Creole pieces" that Gottschalk composed between 1848 and 1851.

== Musical analysis ==
Frederick Starr, in his biography of Gottschalk, writes that the work was given "not an ethnographic name but a catchy genre title, which would flag it as a sophisticated fantasy evoking all that the word bamboula' signified in France" and the title indicates Bamboula "was intended as a self-conscious work of art rather than a piece of ethnographic reporting."

Gottschalk's incorporation of Creole elements has nevertheless prompted comparisons to traditional rhythms. According to the Dictionary of the English/Creole of Trinidad & Tobago, the term "bamboula" refers to "a kind of vigorous African-based dance with singing and drumming", possibly from the Southern Kikongo (Congo) language, in which it means "a word which transfers the force of external things into oneself"; and in the Jola languages "bombolong", "war dance" (Eastern Kikongo: "ignite").

An early 1950 Haitian Vodou ritual recording by Harold Courlander, "Baboule Dance (three drums)", shows a traditional rhythmic drum pattern very similar to the specific rhythm found in Gottschalk's Bamboula. This is evidence that the bamboula was an old dance based on a particular rhythm that Gottschalk heard in his youth; many African Americans in New Orleans had come from Haiti and reference the term "bamboula"; this rhythm can also be found in various Caribbean islands.

A 1954 biguine-style recording, "Bamboula", made in April 1954 (with added lyrics in creole French) by Abel Beauregard Et l'Orchestre Créole Matou from Guadeloupe, is a cover version based on Gottschalk's Bamboula.

Being based on two Creole melodies (Musieu Bainjo and Quan' patate la cuite), Bamboula was published with the subtitle Danse des nègres at the Bureau Central de la Musique on 22 April 1849 by Escudier (a Paris publisher); many unauthorized copies were issued in Europe shortly thereafter. Its first concert performance occurred on the evening of 17 April 1849 at the Salle Pleyel during Gottschalk's second appearance as a professional pianist.

The composition—written in the key of D♭ major, with a strongly rhythmically marked melody—is organized into three sections (AAB). The introduction begins with a concluding gesture in the bass range, mimicking a drum beat. The second is a transposition of the first theme, while the third is underlined by a heavily syncopated melody in the relative minor (B♭ minor). With a duple 2/4 time signature and an Allegro tempo marking, the composition features many shifting moods and virtuosic passages.
