= Creole music melodies =

Several melodies appear in more than one Creole music compilations; in each case, the title, spelling, etc., are as found in the earliest compilation in the table below:

Title	Compilations	First words
Ah, Mélanie	DS	Ah, Mélanie tu veu m'é mer, non, non totor, pas aujourdui.
Ah, Suzette, Chère	BB	Ah, Suzette, chère, to pas l'aimain moin, chère,
Aurore Bradaire (Aurore Pradère)	AA, SS, CF, DS	Aurore Bradaire, belle ti fille,
Beau Matin Mo Contré Manette	LF	Beau matin mo contré Manette qui t'a-pé couri cô-té pa' Chalot.
Belle Layotte	SS, CF, DS	Mo déjà roulé tout la côte Pancor ouar pareil belle Layotte.
Calinda	SS	Michié Préval li donnin granbal, Li fait naig payé pou sauté inpé.
Caroline	SS, AA, CF, DS	Aine, dé, trois, Caroline, ça ça yé comme ça ma chére,
Chaoui	LF (3rd ed., 1981)	Chaoui c'es' ain ti moun qui bien malin.
Cher', Mo L'aime Toi	DS	Cher', mo l'aime toi, Cher', mo l'aime toi, oui,
Clémentine	BB	Ça fait moin la peine, Clémentine,
Compèr Lapin	DS	Aie! Yaya compèr lapin, c'é tit' bête qui connin sauté.
Criole Candjo	AA	In zou' in zène Criole Candjo
Dan' Gran' Chimin	DS	Quan' mo té dan' gran' chimin, mo contré mou vié papa,
Dansez Codaine	BB	Dansez Codaine (twice), C'est macaque qu'a pv joué violon,
En Avan', Grénadié	CS, BB, DS	En avan' Grénadié, Ça qui mou ri n'a pas ration.
Gardé Piti Milat' La (= Misieu Bainjo)	CS, CF, BB	Gardé piti Milat' la' piti banjo la' com' li insolent
Gué-Gué Solingaie	BB	Gué-gué Solingaie, balliez chimin-là, M'a dis li, oui, m'a dis li,
La Maison Denise	DS	You' zen' connin tit' la maison, qui proch' coté l'église
Lolotte	SS, AA, DS	Pauve piti Lolotte a mouin,
Michié Préval	BB	Michié Préval li donnain grand bal,
Milatrés' Cou'ri Dan' Bal	DS	Milatrés' cou'ri dan' bal (twice), cocodril' porté fanal -
Mouché Mazireau	CS	Mouché Mazireau dan' son vié bireau li Semblé
Musieu Bainjo (Mister Banjo)	SS, AA, DS	Voyez cemulet là, Musieu Bainjo, Comme il est insolent.
Neg' Pa' Capab' Marché	CS	Neg' pa' capab' marché san maïs danś poche cé pou' volé poule.
Ou Som Souroucou	CS	Ou Som Souroucou, qui ça ou gagnien, ganien pou' do l'eau.
Po' Pitie Mamzé Zizi	CS, BB, DS	Po' pitie Mamzé Zizi (thrice), li gagnien bobo à son cheu'.
Quan' Mo Té Dan' Gran' Chimain	CS	Quan' mo té dan' gran' chimain mo contré niou vié papa
Quand Mo-Té Jeune	CF, DS	Quan' mo té jeune, mo té jonglé missié
Quan' Patate La Cuite	CS	Quan' patate la cuite. N'a va mangé
Papa Va Á La Riviére	CS	Manman va á la riviére, papa va péché de' crab'
Rémon	SS, AA, DS	Mo parle Rémon, Rémon, Li parle Simon, Simon,
Salangadou	CS, DS	Salangadou (4 times), 'cou té piti fille la yé
Suzanne, Suzanne, Jolie Femme!	BB	Suzanne, Suzanne, Jolie Femme! (twice) Li pas mandé fauteuil bourré,
Tan Patate-lá Tchuite	BB, DS	Et tan patate-lá tchuite, N'a nannan li, n'a nanan li!
Tan' Siro' É Dou'	DS	Tan' siro' é dou, Madeleine, tan' siro' é dou
Une Deusse Troisse (= Caroline)	CS	Une deusse troisse Adeline Ça Ça yé com' Ça me ché
Valsez, Valsez	DS	Valsez, Valsez pren' gar' vou tombé, va cassé bou di nez.
Vous T'é in Morico!	BB	Ah! Toucouyoute, mo connain vous, Vous t'é in morico!
Z'Amours Marianne	BB	Si l'amour vous si fort, Michié-là
Zélime, To Quitte' La Plaine	CS, DS	Zélime, to quitte' la plaine di pi qu'mo pli' miré toué;
