= La Savane (Gottschalk) =

1846 ballade for piano

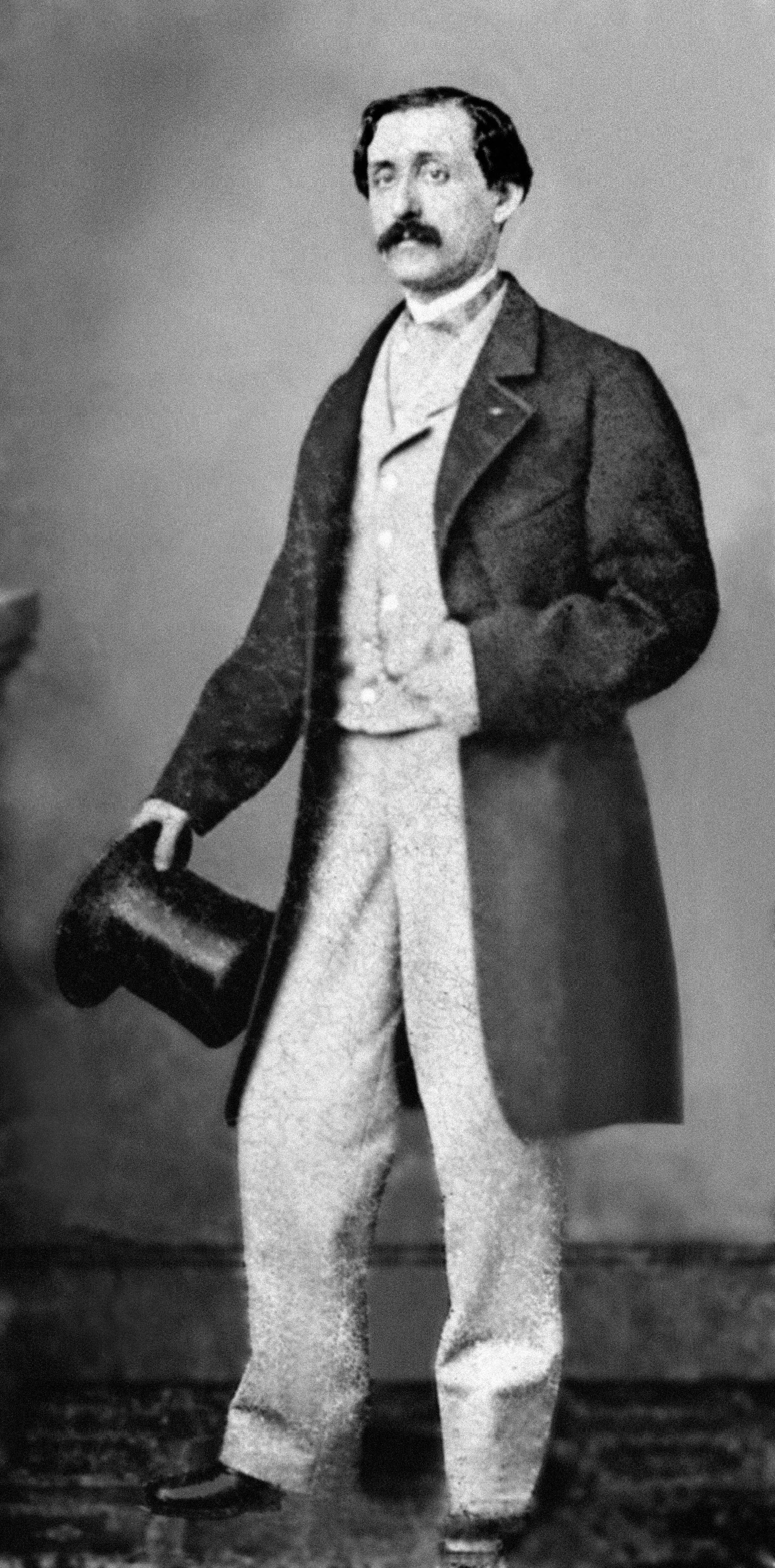
Photo of Louis Moreau Gottschalk

La Savane (The Savannah), Op. 3, is a composition in the form of a ballade written for piano in 1846 by the American composer Louis Moreau Gottschalk. With the subtitle Ballade Créole, it was first published in 1849 by Gottschalk's publisher 'Escudiers' and again in 1850 by Editions Schott, with a dedication to Maria II of Portugal on the composer's assumption that a trip from Madrid to Lisbon during his concert tour in the spring of that year was likely to happen.

La Savane is supposedly inspired by the local story that the skeletons of runaway slaves who perished in the swamps around New Orleans had turned into oaks. It features an introductory melody that resembles the folk tune "Skip to My Lou," but it is actually based on portions of the Creole Louisiana song Lolotte or Pov'piti Lolotte. Written in the key of E♭ minor, it consists of 146 bars and has an 84 bpm Andante tempo, with the mood marked as con malinconia.
