= Souvenir de Porto Rico =

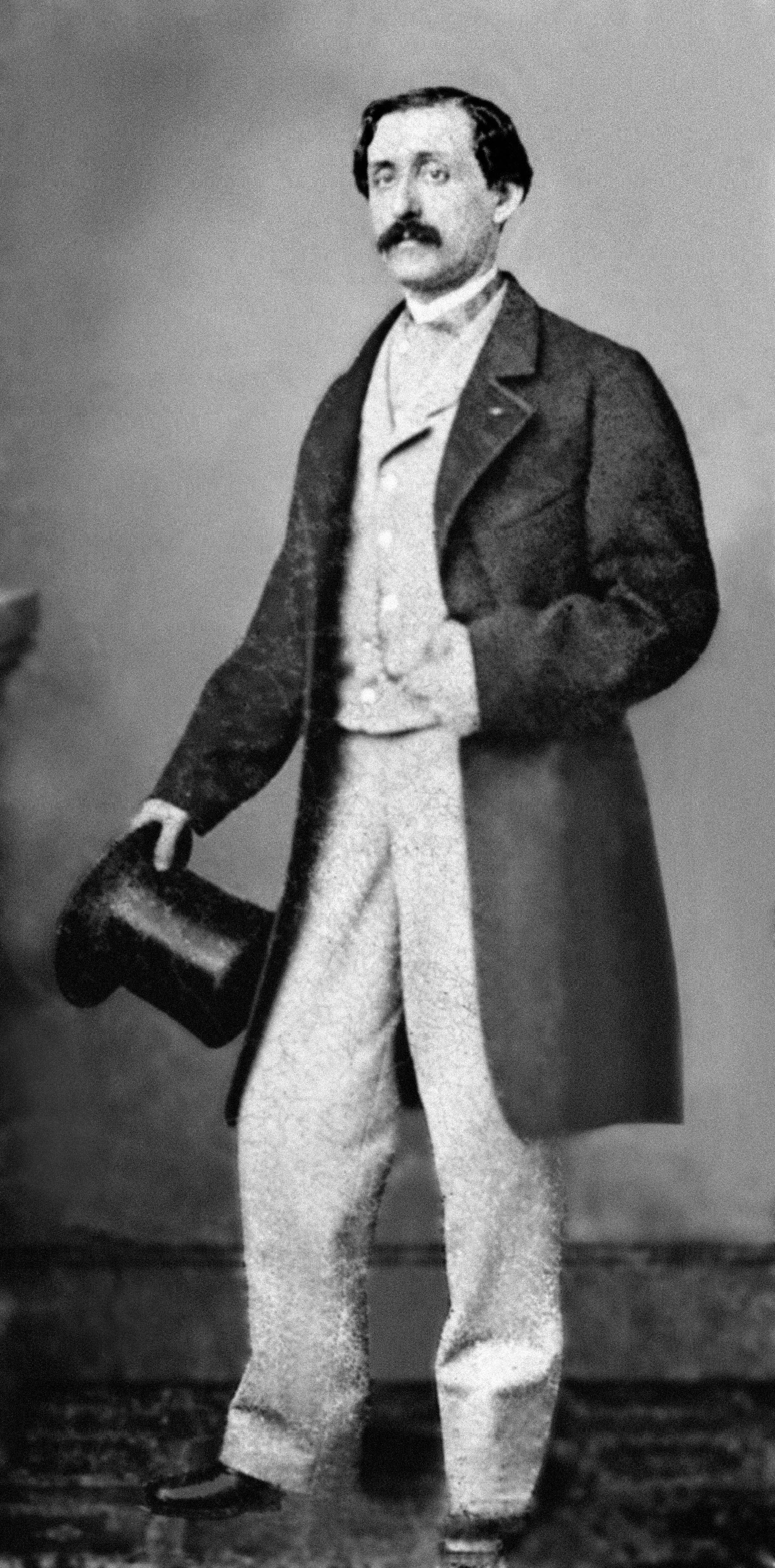
Photo of Louis Moreau Gottschalk

Souvenir de Porto Rico, Op. 31, is a musical composition for piano by American composer Louis Moreau Gottschalk written from 1857 during a tour in Puerto Rico. Dedicated to the Dutch piano virtuoso and salon music composer Ernest Henry Lubeck, and published in Mainz circa 1860 with the subtitle of Marche des Gibaros, it is based on the Christmas folk song Si me dan pasteles, denmelos calientes, performed by local peasants known as Jíbaros. The piece makes use of Latin-American and Afro-American melodies and rhythms almost fifty years before early ragtime and jazz would popularize its use.

== History ==
Souvenir de Porto Rico was written in the last trimester of 1857, when of Gottschalk's stay at the sugar plantation of English-born Mr. Cornelius Cartwright, in Plazuela. (Note: Plazuela is located just outside the village of Barceloneta, around thirty miles west of San Juan, in the northern coast of Puerto Rico.) At the time, Gottschalk was on vacation with singer Adelina Patti and her father. He would decide not to leave Puerto Rico, but instead remain there for weeks. During this period he composed a number of additional pieces after the local musical styles.

Gottschalk would say about the setting where he composed the piece: "[I was] perched upon the edge of a crater, [and] my cabin overlooked the whole country. Every evening I moved my piano out upon the terrace, and played for myself alone, everything that the scene opened up before me inspired. It was there that I composed 'Marche des Gibaros.'"

== Musical analysis ==
The piece in E♭ minor, set in two-four time with an initial tempo of Moderato ma con moto, consists of a repetition of two specific themes. The "A" theme, borrowed from a Puerto Rican folk song, is introduced piano or softly. The "B" theme, marked maliconico (melancholy) in the score, provides contrast by switching to a higher register and a major mode. Both themes are accompanied by a traditional march rhythm, the pattern being long, long, short, short, long. Gottschalk then subjects the two themes to seven variations. Each variation is louder and more rhythmically complex than the previous until the fifth variation. At this point, the piece reaches its climax, and the following variations return to a softer and less dense version of the two themes.

In his variations of the "A" theme, Gottschalk makes use of four Afro-Caribbean rhythms he learned during his time in the West Indies. These rhythms consist of a tresillo, a pattern of three unequal notes, two cinquillos, patterns of five unequal notes, and the habanera, a rhythmic dance he had heard in Havana. Additionally, he varies both themes with examples of typical European virtuoso style. He couples the syncopation of Latin rhythms with the virtuosic lines of his European background.

== Sources ==
- Jackson, Richard, Piano Music of Louis Moreau Gottschalk. Dover Publication Inc. 1973
