= Monsieur Banjo =

American folk song

Monsieur Banjo is an American folk song. Its existence as a "slave song" was attested in 1867. It came to public attention when it was included as the fourth track on side two of Pete Seeger's 1961 album "American Favorite Ballads, Vol. 4".
