= Louis Moreau Gottschalk =

American composer and pianist (1829–1869)

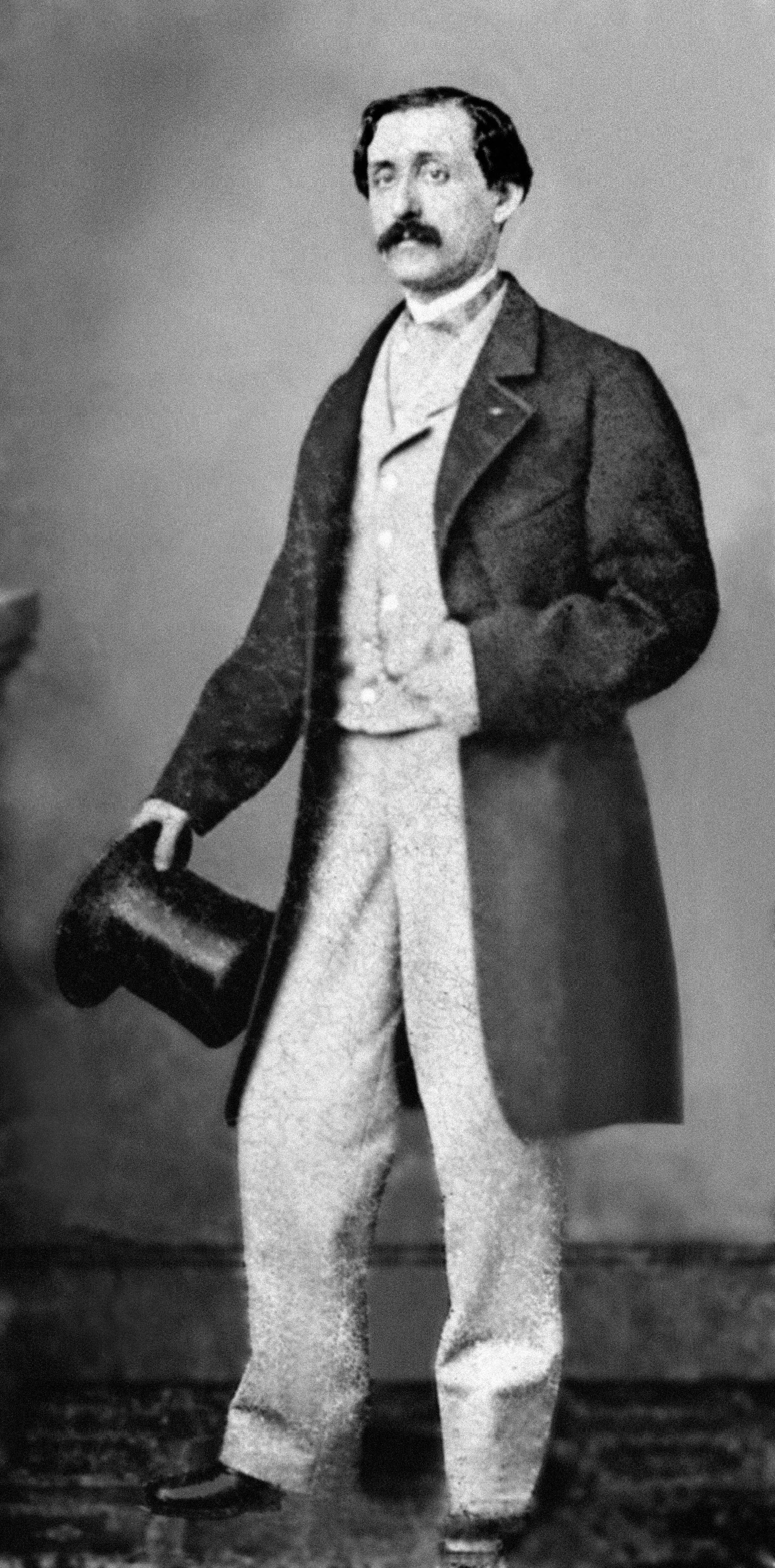
- Photograph by Mathew Brady (late 1850s–early 1860s)
- Born: May 8, 1829; New Orleans, Louisiana, U.S.
- Died: December 18, 1869 (aged 40); Rio de Janeiro, Brazil
- Occupations: Composer; pianist

Signature
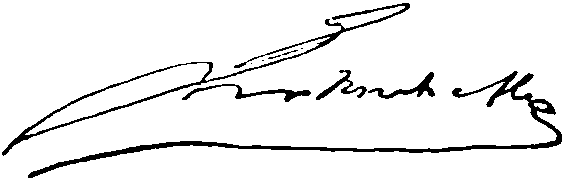

Louis Moreau Gottschalk (May 8, 1829 – December 18, 1869) was a Louisiana Creole and Jewish-American composer, pianist, and virtuoso performer of his own romantic piano works. He spent most of his working career outside the United States.

== Life and career ==
Louis Moreau Gottschalk was born on May 8, 1829, in New Orleans, Louisiana, to Edward Gottschalk and Aimée Marie Bruslé. He had six brothers and sisters, five of whom were half-siblings by his father's biracial mistress. Gottschalk's family lived for a time in a tiny cottage at Royal and Esplanade in the Vieux Carré. He later moved in with relatives at 518 Conti Street; his maternal grandmother Bruslé and his nurse Sally were both Saint Dominican Creoles, the majority of which had migrated to Louisiana and assimilated to Louisiana Creole society. Gottschalk was therefore exposed to a variety of musical traditions and influences and played the piano from an early age. He was soon recognized as a prodigy by the New Orleans bourgeois establishment, making his informal public debut in 1840 at the new St. Charles Hotel.

Only two years later, at age 13, Gottschalk left the United States and sailed to Europe, as he and his father realized a classical training was required to fulfill his musical ambitions. However, the Paris Conservatoire rejected Gottschalk's application without hearing him on the grounds of his nationality; Pierre Zimmerman, head of the piano faculty, commented that "America is a country of steam engines". Gottschalk eventually gained access to the musical establishment through family friends, but important early compositions like Bamboula (Danse des Nègres) and La Savane established him as a genuinely American composer, and not a mere imitator of the European written tradition; they were a major artistic statement as they carried a legacy of music of enslaved African people in a romantic music context, and as such they were also precursors of jazz. They still stand as the first examples of Louisiana Creole music in classical music culture. After a concert at the Salle Pleyel, Frédéric Chopin remarked: "Give me your hand, my child; I predict that you will become the king of pianists." Franz Liszt and Charles-Valentin Alkan, too, recognized Gottschalk's extreme talent.

After Gottschalk returned to the United States in 1853, he traveled extensively; a sojourn in Cuba during 1854 was the beginning of a series of trips to Central and South America. Gottschalk also traveled to Puerto Rico after his Havana debut and at the start of his West Indian period. Gottschalk was quite taken with the music he heard on the island, so much so that he composed a work, probably in 1857, entitled Souvenir de Porto Rico; Marche des gibaros, Op. 31 (RO250). "Gibaros" refers to the jíbaros, or Puerto Rican peasantry. The theme of the composition is a march tune which may be based on a Puerto Rican folk song form.

At the end of the tour, Gottschalk rested in New Jersey before returning to New York City. There, he continued to rest and took on a very young Venezuelan student, Teresa Carreño. Gottschalk rarely took on students and was skeptical of prodigies, but Carreño was an exception, and he was determined that she would succeed. With his busy schedule, Gottschalk was only able to give her a handful of lessons, yet Carreño would remember him fondly and performed his music for the rest of her days. A year after meeting Gottschalk, she performed for Abraham Lincoln and would go on to become a renowned concert pianist earning the nickname "Valkyrie of the Piano". His other students included American composer and pianist Anna Ware Poole.

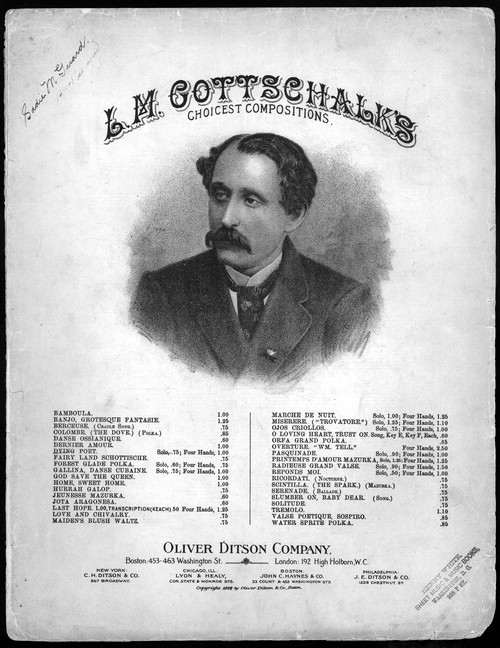
Louis Moreau Gottschalk pictured on an 1864 Publication of The Dying Poet for piano

In late 1855 and early 1856, Gottschalk made connections with several notable figures of the New York art world, including the sculptor Erastus Dow Palmer, composer and musician George William Warren and Hudson River School landscape painter Frederic Edwin Church. Like Gottschalk, Church had traveled extensively in Latin America (primarily Ecuador and Colombia) and produced a series of large-scale canvases of South American subject. Gottschalk dedicated a Mazurka poétique to Church, who gave Gottschalk a small (now unidentified) landscape painting. Gottschalk also possibly collaborated with Warren on his 1863 The Andes, Marche di Bravoura, a solo piano piece inspired by Church's large-scale South American painting of 1859, The Heart of the Andes.

By the 1860s, Gottschalk had established himself as the best known pianist in the New World. Although born and raised in New Orleans, he was a supporter of the Union cause during the American Civil War. Gottschalk returned to his native city only occasionally for concerts, but he always introduced himself as a New Orleans native. Gottschalk composed the tarantella, Grande Tarantelle, Op. 67, subtitled Célèbre Tarentelle, during 1858–64.

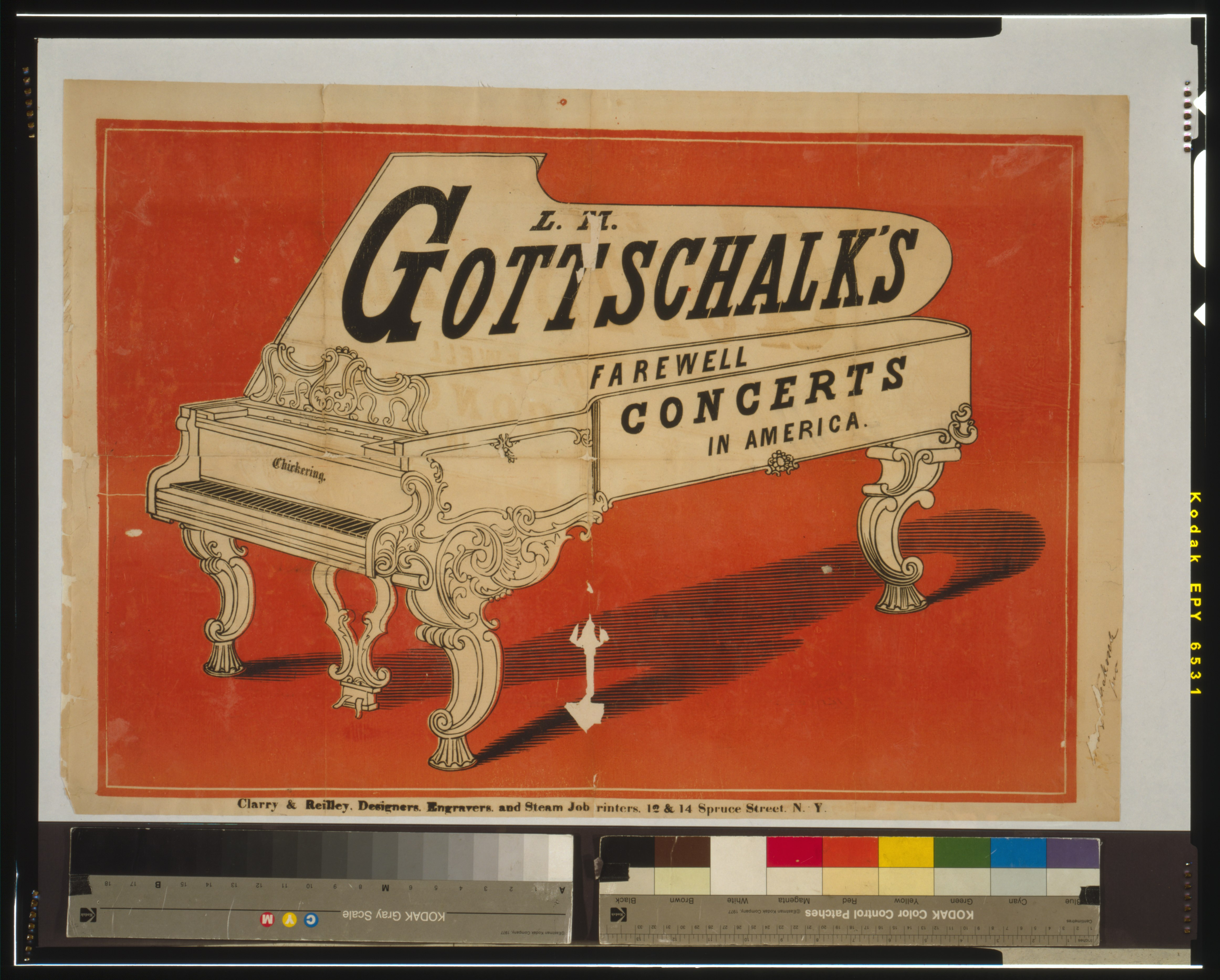
L.M. Gottschalk's Farewell Concerts in America before departing for Havana and Mexico. January 26, 1865.

In May 1865, Gottschalk was mentioned in a San Francisco newspaper as having "travelled 95,000 miles by rail and given 1,000 concerts". However, he was forced to leave the United States later that year because of an alleged affair with a student at the Oakland Female Seminary in Oakland, California. Gottschalk denied any wrongdoing, saying that the subsequent publication of this incident was an attempt to undermine his reputation by a rival of the piano manufacturer Chickering & Sons, the same brand of piano that Gottschalk used on his tours. He never returned to the United States.

== Death ==
Gottschalk chose to travel to South America, where he continued to give frequent concerts. During one of these concerts, at the Teatro Lyrico Fluminense in Rio de Janeiro, Brazil, on November 24, 1869, Gottschalk collapsed from yellow fever. Just before collapsing, he had finished playing his romantic piece Morte! (translated from Portuguese as "Death"), although the actual collapse occurred just as Gottschalk started to play his celebrated piece Tremolo. Gottschalk never recovered from the collapse.

Less than a month later, on December 18, 1869, at age 40, Gottschalk died at his hotel in Tijuca, Rio de Janeiro, probably from an overdose of quinine. According to an essay by Jeremy Nicholas for the booklet accompanying the recording "Gottschalk Piano Music" performed by Philip Martin on the Hyperion label, "He died ... of empyema, the result of a ruptured abscess in the abdomen."

In 1870, Gottschalk's remains were returned to the United States and were interred at the Green-Wood Cemetery in Brooklyn, New York City. His burial spot was originally marked by a magnificent marble monument, topped by an "Angel of Music" statue, which was irreparably damaged by vandals in 1959. In October 2012, after nearly 15 years of fundraising by the Green-Wood Cemetery, a new "Angel of Music" statue, created by sculptors Giancarlo Biagi and Jill Burkee to replace the damaged one, was unveiled.

== Works ==
"Tournament Galop"
Gottschalk's "Tournament Galop" transcribed for woodwind quintet and performed by the Rampart Winds of the United States Air Force Academy Band

Gottschalk's music was very popular during his lifetime and his earliest compositions created a sensation in Europe. Early pieces like Bamboula, La Savane, Le Bananier and Le Mancenillier were based on Gottschalk's memories of the music he heard during his youth in Louisiana and are widely regarded as the earliest existing pieces of creole music in classical culture. In this context, some of Gottschalk's work, such as the 13-minute opera Escenas campestres, retains value. Gottschalk also utilized the Bamboula theme as a melody in his Symphony No. 1: A Night in the Tropics. A melody from Gottschalk's Souvenirs d'Andalousie (Memories of Andalusia) forms the basis of a highly popular 20th century piece "Malagueña" by Ernesto Lecuona.

Composer, pianist, and musicologist Jeanne Behrend edited a selection of his piano scores, and his autobiography, Notes of a Pianist, in 1964.

Many of Gottschalk's compositions were destroyed after his death or are lost. Musicologist Richard Jackson served as the editor of a 1973 published collection of Gottschalk’s piano music and concurrently organized an exhibition of Gottschalk and his music at the New York Public Library.

== Recordings ==
Various pianists later recorded his piano music. The first important recordings of his orchestral music, including the symphony A Night in the Tropics, were made for Vanguard Records by Maurice Abravanel and the Utah Symphony Orchestra. Vox Records issued a multi-disc collection of his music, which was later reissued on CD. This included world premiere recordings of the original orchestrations of both symphonies and other works, which were conducted by Igor Buketoff and Samuel Adler.

In 1984, Nimbus Records issued The Lady Fainted, a selection of piano fantasies, caprices, meditations and paraphrases played by Alan Marks. Lambert Orkis recorded a selection of Gottschalk's music on an 1865 Chickering concert grand in 1988 as part of The Smithsonian Collection of Recordings. The music of Gottschalk was used in the soundtrack for the Michel Deville film Aux Petits Bonheurs, which was played by Noël Lee on a Steinway piano and released by Erato Records in 1994. Beginning in the 1990s, Philip Martin recorded most of Gottschalk's extant piano music for Hyperion Records.

== In popular culture ==
Author Howard Breslin wrote a historical novel about Gottschalk titled Concert Grand in 1963.

A version of Gottschalk's Bamboula, with added lyrics, was recorded in April 1934 by trumpet player Abel Beauregard's dance band, the Orchestre Créole Matou from the French Caribbean Guadeloupe island. This is the first recording of this composition, as the first 'classical piano' recordings of Gottschalk's works were not recorded until 1956, by American pianist Eugene List. Other recordings related to the specific bamboula rhythm heard by Gottschalk in New Orleans' Congo Square and used on his famous 1845 composition Bamboula can be found on a 1950 Haitian voodoo recording Baboule Dance (three drums). On the 1962 Cuban folk tune Rezos Congos (Bamboula, Conga Music). Comments by musicologist Bruno Blum are included in each of the above releases. New Orleans singer and pianist Dr. John's recording of Litanie des Saints from Goin' Back to New Orleans was inspired by Gottschalk's Souvenir de Porto Rico.

== See also ==
- Great Galloping Gottschalk, a contemporary ballet set to the music of Gottschalk
- Clara Gottschalk Peterson, Gottschalk's sister and a pianist and composer in her own right
- Louis F. Gottschalk, Gottschalk's great nephew
