= Fun Fun Fun Fest =

Annual music festival held in Austin, Texas

- Genre: Indie rock, punk rock, hip-hop, electronic
- Dates: Early November
- Locations: Austin, Texas, U.S.
- Years active: 2006–2015
- Founders: Transmission Entertainment; Graham Williams; Tim League
- Website: funfunfunfest.com

Fun Fun Fun Fest (often abbreviated as "FFF" or "F3F") was an annual music and comedy festival held in Austin, Texas, United States. It featured stages that focused specifically on hip-hop / electronica, indie rock, punk / metal, and comedy.

Started in 2006, the festival focused on a combination of discovering emerging talent and putting together rarely seen or anticipated reunion performances. Being based in Austin (The Live Music Capital of the World), FFF had the unique opportunity to work with newer performers that had yet to experience the national stage. The festival had a history of unearthing new artists that eventually ended up in mainstream music and festival markets. The festival's name itself was a nod to the independent music scene in Austin, specifically Big Boys, an early and highly influential hardcore punk band who released their EP "Fun Fun Fun" through the Austin-based underground label Moment Productions in 1982. After the final Fun Fun Fun Fest, some of the organizers went on to produce Sound on Sound Fest, "Sound on Sound" also a title of a Big Boys song.

Fun Fun Fun Fest was dedicated to Austin's unique culture, featuring street food from some of Austin's favorite eateries, an annual American Poster Institute poster show featuring work from artists across the country, pop-up vintage fashion shops, hair salons, and record stores. The festival also hosted everything from a mechanical bull to a live wrestling ring featuring Sexy Sax Man on site.

Notable performers include Public Enemy, Spoon, Weird Al Yankovic, Girl Talk, The Descendents, MGMT, Bad Religion, Danzig, Mastodon, The Dead Milkmen, Sophie, Slayer, Slick Rick, Pharcyde, Cat Power, The National, M83, Circle Jerks, Todd Barry, Reggie Watts, Henry Rollins, Neil Hamburger, Gwar, the return of famed Detroit punkers, Death, and many more.

In 2011, Fun Fun Fun Fest was moved to Auditorium Shores, a much larger downtown park, a change from previous years in which the event was held at Waterloo Park. 2011 saw the addition of a third full day and FFF Nites, a set of free aftershows for ticket holders in downtown Austin music venues, featuring an additional 75+ artists. Additionally, Ryan Gosling and Rooney Mara filmed a sequence for the Terrence Malick film Song to Song on November 4, 2011, on the festival grounds.

The 2012 festival took place November 2–4 at Auditorium Shores. The event made headlines with the announcement of a reunion of the hip hop group, Run–D.M.C. for their first show in a decade.

The festival had its final year in 2015. Some of the event producers have moved on to produce an event called Sound on Sound Music Festival, which takes place at the Sherwood Forest Faire site in McDade, TX.

== Origins ==
The show began in 2006 when Graham Williams, working at Emo's, overbooked one night in December at the club. He, independent Emo's, worked with Tim League to create a one-off, one day festival in Waterloo Park. However, Williams left Emo's in 2007 to work at booking shows full time through Transmission Entertainment, which ran Fun Fun Fun Fest.

By 2010 the show had expanded to become a three-day event.

== Lineups ==
=== 2015 ===
==== Orange Stage ====
- Jane's Addiction
- D'Angelo and the Vanguard (Cancelled)
- Chromeo
- CHVRCHES
- Cheap Trick
- RIDE
- Antemasque
- Toro y Moi
- American football
- The Growlers
- Fuzz
- Mikal Cronin
- The Charlatans
- Preoccupations (Viet Cong)
- Alvvays
- Speedy Ortiz
- Broncho
- Joanna Gruesome
- Grifters
- Creepoid
- A Giant Dog
- Golden Dawn Arkestra
- Think No Think
- Ringo Deathstarr
- Lauryn Hill

==== Blue Stage ====
- Wu-Tang Clan
- Future Islands
- ScHoolboy Q
- Grimes
- ODESZA
- Neon Indian
- Rae Sremmurd
- MSTRKRFT
- Hudson Mohawke
- Gesaffelstein
- Peaches
- Joey Bada$$
- Big Freedia
- Afrika Bambaataa (DJ set)
- Slow Magic
- Lido
- Doomtree
- Anamanaguchi
- Roosevelt
- Shamir
- Bomba Estereo
- Kembe X
- Two-9
- Bayonne (Roger Sellers)
- The Outfit, TX
- S U R V I V E
- Keeper

==== Black Stage ====
- Venom
- NOFX
- Gogol Bordello
- Coheed and Cambria
- Drive Like Jehu
- L7
- Dag Nasty
- Desaparecidos (Canceled)
- American Nightmare
- Archers of Loaf
- Converge
- Chain Of Strength
- Babes In Toyland
- Parquet Courts
- Off!
- La Dispute
- Title Fight
- Fucked Up
- Head Wound City
- The Dwarves
- Mutoid Man
- Nothing
- together PANGEA
- Power Trip
- American Sharks
- Future Death

==== Yellow Stage ====
- Tig Notaro
- Andrew W.K.
- Doug Benson
- GZA
- Gad Elmaleh
- Kurt Braunohler
- Lucas Bros
- Eric Andre
- Sabrina Jalees
- Todd Barry
- Eugene Mirman
- Derrick C. Brown
- Murder By Death
- Twerking Lessons with Big Freedia
- Cass McCombs
- Lil Freckles
- Steve Gunn
- BadBadNotGood
- Chris Cubas
- Dr. Scott Bolton
- Saffron Herndon
- King Khan & BBQ Show
- Bad Example
- Benjamin Booker
- East Cameron Folkcore
- Andrew Jackson Jihad
- Sandbox with Rob Gagnon
- TOPS
- Air Sex World Championships
- The Altercation Punk Comedy Tour
- The Secret Group
- ATX Comedy Hour
- Greetings From Queer Mountain
- Master Pancake
- The New Movement

==== Ride & Skate ====
- Ryan Sheckler
- Grant Taylor
- Chase Hawk
- Rune Glifberg
- Aaron Ross
- David González
- Dustin Dollin
- Louie Lopez
- Tom Dugan
- Collin Provost
- Clint Reynolds
- Axel Cruysberghs
- Joseph Frans
- Ben Raemers
- Dani Lightningbolt
- Chris Pfanner
- Nina Buitrago
- Caswell Berry
- Matt Nordstrom
- Paul Cvikevich
- Kenny Horton
- Jeremie Infelise
- Devin Fredlund
- CJ Collins

==== Wrestling ====
* Anarchy Championship Wrestling
- Inspire Pro Wrestling

==== FFF Nites ====
- Tig Notaro
- Andrew W.K.
- Future Islands
- Doug Benson
- GZA
- Lagwagon
- Kurt Braunohler
- American football
- Hudson Mohawke
- Lucas Bros
- The Growlers
- American Nightmare
- Eric Andre
- Fuzz
- Mayhem
- Converge
- Watain
- Mikal Cronin
- Sabrina Jalees
- Peaches
- Chain Of Strength
- Joey Bada$$
- Subhumans
- Todd Barry
- Skinny Puppy
- Viet Cong
- Les Sins (Toro Y Moi DJ Set)
- Parquet Courts
- Alvvays
- OFF!
- Speedy Ortiz
- La Dispute
- Slow Magic
- Title Fight
- Murder By Death
- Doomtree
- Trippy Turtle
- Fucked Up
- Lil Freckles
- Steve Gunn
- Broncho
- Har Mar Superstar
- Head Wound City
- Anamanaguchi
- Joanna Gruesome
- Roosevelt
- The Dwarves
- Grifters
- Windhand
- Shamir
- King Khan & BBQ Show
- Creepoid
- East Cameron Folkcore
- Mutoid Man
- Snakehips
- Small Brown Bike
- TOPS
- Giraffage
- Nothing
- Runaway Kids
- Sarah Jaffe
- together PANGEA
- A Giant Dog
- Power Trip
- Two-9
- Bayonne (Roger Sellers)
- Girlpool
- Golden Dawn Arkestra
- Think No Think
- Alex G
- Pity Sex
- Ringo Deathstarr
- Wild Ones
- The Outfit, TX
- American Sharks
- Danava
- S U R V I V E
- Dirty Fences
- Future Death
- One Night Stand
- Live Action Battle Rap
- Keeper
- Pure Bathing Culture
- Rotting Christ
- Empty Vessels
- The Applicators
- Youth Code
- GEMS
- Milezo
- Protextor
- Crooked Bangs
- NOTS
- Sniper 66
- Dirty Kid Discount
- Borzoi
- Xetas
- Daktyl
- Vockah Redu
- Cult Leader
- Magna Carda
- Christeene
- Moving Panoramas
- soundfounder
- Technicolor Hearts
- Yonatan Gat
- Magnet School
- OBN III's
- PEARS
- The Bad Lovers
- Monolord
- Wildhoney
- Otis The Destroyer
- The Well
- Wet Lungs
- Big Bill
- Moonlight Towers
- Slooom
- Booher
- Illustrations
- Body Pressure
- Late Night Basement
- Commoners
- Red Death
- Sailor Poon
- Carl Sagan's Skate Shoes
- Rozwell Kid
- Easy Prey
- Barnaby Saints
- Tele Novella
- Woodgrain
- Feral Future
- Hard Proof
- Hidden Ritual
- Kid Trails
- Dead Tapes
- Fuck Work
- Burnt Skull
- Corduroi & Selva Oscura

=== 2014 ===
==== Music ====
- Judas Priest
- Nas
- Girl Talk
- Neutral Milk Hotel
- Modest Mouse
- King Diamond
- Wiz Khalifa
- alt-J
- Death From Above 1979
- 2 Chainz
- Rocket From The Crypt
- Dinosaur Jr.
- Atmosphere
- First Aid Kit
- The Blood Brothers
- The New Pornographers
- Flying Lotus
- Gorilla Biscuits
- Guided By Voices
- Sky Ferreira
- City and Colour
- Amon Amarth
- Gary Numan
- Failure
- Glassjaw
- Yo La Tengo
- The Presets
- Black Lips
- Dum Dum Girls
- Ginuwine
- Iceage
- Z Trip
- Hot Water Music
- Foxygen
- Run the Jewels
- Sick of It All
- Courtney Barnett
- Cashmere Cat
- Mineral
- Deafheaven
- Freddie Gibbs & Madlib
- METZ
- San Fermin
- Sun Kil Moon
- Lunice
- Pissed Jeans
- Yann Tiersen
- SZA
- Majical Cloudz
- Jello Biafra and the Guantanamo School of Medicine
- Yelle
- Pallbearer
- Angel Olsen
- Iron Reagan
- The Internet
- Knapsack
- Pianos Become the Teeth
- SOHN
- Ryan Hemsworth
- Tinariwen
- J Mascis
- Mas Ysa
- The Bots
- King Tuff
- Say Lou Lou
- Fat White Family
- Chelsea Wolfe
- Gardens & Villa
- Reputante
- Roosevelt
- Radkey
- ASTR
- Spider Bags
- Cities Aviv
- Twin Peaks
- Julianna Barwick
- Wildcat Wildcat
- Jacuzzi
- Scott H. Biram
- The World is a Beautiful Place & I am No Longer Afraid to Die
- Nostalghia
- Thundercat
- This Will Destroy You
- Zorch
- Crooked Bangs
- Blue, The Misfit.
- Dana Falconberry
- Communion
- The Sour Notes
- Breakout
- The Digital Wild
- Good Field
- Intimate Stranger
- Residual Kid

==== Wrestling ====
* Anarchy Championship Wrestling
- Inspire Pro Wrestling

=== 2013 ===
==== Music ====
- MGMT
- M.I.A.
- Slayer
- Chelsea Light Moving
- Misfits
- Snoop Dogg
- Descendents
- Cut Copy
- Jurassic 5
- Flag
- Simian Mobile Disco
- Quicksand
- The Walkmen
- Ice-T
- Bonobo
- Lupe Fiasco
- Killer Mike
- Television
- RJD2
- The Locust
- The Julie Ruin
- The Impossibles
- Judge
- Big K.R.I.T.
- Subhumans
- Big Freedia
- Chromatics
- Gojira
- Tycho
- Geographer
- Glass Candy
- Body Count
- Deerhunter
- August Burns Red
- Thee Oh Sees
- Cloud Nothings
- Action Bronson
- The Dismemberment Plan
- Cro-Mags
- Shlohmo
- Ceremony
- Washed Out
- XXYYXX
- Johnny Marr
- Melt Banana
- Retox
- Little Boots
- Kurt Vile
- Daniel Johnston
- Pelican
- Delorean
- Sparks
- Star Slinger
- Polyphonic Spree
- Title Fight
- Poolside
- Blake Schwarzenbach
- White Lung
- Dessa
- Small Black
- King Khan and the Shrines
- Bill Callahan
- LNS Crew

=== 2012 ===
==== Music ====
- Run–D.M.C.
- X
- Edward Sharpe and the Magnetic Zeroes
- De La Soul
- Santigold
- The Head and the Heart
- Bun B
- Julian Casablancas
- Fucked Up
- Girl Talk
- Explosions in the Sky
- Real Estate
- The Promise Ring
- Turbonegro
- Superchunk
- Rakim
- Titus Andronicus
- Against Me!
- Braid
- Bob Mould
- Tomahawk
- Cursive
- Kreayshawn
- Schoolboy Q
- Refused
- Danny Brown
- Liturgy
- ASAP Rocky
- Japandroids
- Lagwagon
- Surfer Blood
- Public Image Ltd

==== Comedy ====
- David Cross
- Hannibal Buress
- Wyatt Cenac
- Doug Benson
- Eugene Mirman
- Saul Williams
- Jon Benjamin
- Duncan Carson
- Ramin Nazer
- Doug Mellard
- Chris Cubas

=== 2011 ===
==== Music ====
- Public Enemy
- Slayer
- Passion Pit
- Spoon
- Danzig Legacy
- Lykke Li
- Flying Lotus
- Hum
- Childish Gambino
- Black Lips
- Girls
- Clap Your Hands Say Yeah
- Reggie Watts
- Diplo
- Architecture in Helsinki
- Okkervil River
- Neon Indian
- Ra Ra Riot
- Murder City Devils
- Donald Glover
- Tune-Yards
- M83
- The Joy Formidable
- We Were Promised Jetpacks
- Turquoise Jeep
- Joe Lally
- Major Lazer
- Odd Future
- Death Grips
- Ted Leo and the Pharmacists
- Del tha Funkee Homosapien
- Black Joe Lewis
- The Thermals
- Cloud Nothings
- Jim Ward
- Future Islands
- Keep Shelly in Athens
- Budos Band
- Mates of State
- Russian Circles
- Thee Oh Sees
- Ty Segall
- The Damned
- Hot Snakes
- Blonde Redhead
- Boris
- Cannibal Corpse
- Four Tet
- Spank Rock
- Big Freedia
- YACHT
- Rakim
- Cold Cave
- Cave In
- Dan Deacon
- Baths
- Grimes

==== Comedy ====
- Henry Rollins
- Reggie Watts
- Brian Posehn
- Upright Citizens Brigade
- Donald Glover
- Neal Brennan

=== 2010 ===
- Descendents
- Weird Al Yankovic
- MGMT
- Bad Religion
- RJD2
- Mastodon
- Deerhunter
- Yelle
- The Hold Steady
- Dirty Projectors
- Os Mutantes
- Monotonix
- Gwar
- The Vandals
- Suicidal Tendencies
- The Appleseed Cast
- Best Coast
- Wavves
- Kaki King
- Margot & the Nuclear So and So's
- Slick Rick
- Man Man
- Devin the Dude
- Cap'n Jazz
- Ariel Pink
- Polvo
- Dum Dum Girls
- Crocodiles
- Toro y Moi
- Indian Jewelry
- Mother Falcon
- A-Trak
- Big Freedia
- Junius
- Kylesa
- Valient Thorr
- Snapcase
- Eagle Claw
- Dam Funk
- Peelander-Z

==== Comedy ====
- Moshe Kasher

=== 2009 ===
- Death
- Crystal Castles
- Ratatat
- Yeasayer
- The Cool Kids
- Danzig
- Kid Sister
- This Will Destroy You
- Broadcast
- GZA/Genius
- Why?
- Destroyer
- No Age
- Gorilla Biscuits
- The Strange Boys
- Atlas Sound
- Neon Indian
- Fuck Buttons
- The Jesus Lizard
- Brian Posehn
- Les Savy Fav
- Lucero
- Mika Miko
- 7 Seconds
- Mission of Burma

=== 2008 ===
- The National
- Clap Your Hands Say Yeah
- Minus The Bear
- ...And You Will Know Us by the Trail of Dead
- Atmosphere
- Clipse
- Deerhoof
- Islands
- Frightened Rabbit
- The Bouncing Souls
- Bad Brains
- Bishop Allen
- The Spinto Band
- Dr. Octagon
- Dan Deacon
- YACHT
- The Black Angels
- Annuals
- The Octopus Project
- Leftöver Crack
- Adolescents
- Municipal Waste
- The Dead Milkmen
- Swingin' Utters
- Tim and Eric

=== 2007 ===
- MGMT
- Cat Power
- Of Montreal
- Explosions In The Sky
- The Cribs
- The New Pornographers
- Okkervil River
- Mates of State
- Ted Leo and the Pharmacists
- Girl Talk
- GRAND BUFFET
- DJ Jester the Filipino Fist
- Final Fantasy
- Battles
- Diplo
- Sick of It All
- Neurosis
- Headlights
- I Love You But I've Chosen Darkness
- Don Caballero
- HorrorPops
- Madball
- The Sword
- Busdriver
- Lifetime
- White Denim
- The Saints
- Angry Samoans
- Against Me!
- Youth Brigade
- Evangelicals
- Career Criminal

=== 2006 ===
- Spoon
- Circle Jerks
- Prefuse 73
- Peaches
- Lucero
- Negative Approach
- Riverboat Gamblers
- The Black Angels
- Dead Meadow
- The Octopus Project
- Electric Frankenstein
- Lower Class Brats
- Applicators
- Krumbums
- Iron Age
- ADHD
- DJ Mel
- Quintron and Miss Pussycat
- Learning Secrets
- Dirty South Ravers
- The Oranges Band
- Drag the River
- Whitey
- Learning Secrets
- Ceeplus Bad Knives
- Thomas Turner of Ghostland Observatory

== Taco Cannon ==
Premiering at the 2012 Fun Fun Fun Fest in Austin, TX, the Fun Fun Fun Fest Taco Cannon was a modified 12-chamber T-shirt cannon specifically designed to shoot tacos a maximum 200 feet in the air. The Fun Fun Fun Fest Taco Cannon was the first and only taco launching device. The cannon was powered by carbon dioxide and a car battery, and "takes 40 pounds of carbon dioxide to get through three round of Gatling gun-style shots" with "12 barrels in each round, so 36 shots total per round."

== See also ==
- Music of Austin
