= Dianna =

Dianna is a feminine given name. Originally an alternative spelling of the name Diana, meaning "heavenly, divine".

People with this name include:

- Dianna Agron (born 1986), American actress, singer, and dancer
- Dianna Boileau, Canadian early recipient of sex reassignment surgery
- Dianna Booher (born 1948), American author, and communication expert
- Dianna Clark, American sport fisher
- Dianna Cohen, American artist, activist, and CEO
- Dianna Corcoran (born 1979), Australian country music singer-songwriter
- Dianna Cowern (born 1989), American science educator and YouTuber
- Dianna Dilworth (born 1978), American filmmaker and journalist
- Dianna Duran (born 1956), American politician
- Dianna Fuemana, New Zealand Pacific writer, director and professor
- Dianna Fuller Morgan, American businesswoman
- Dianna Graves, American politician
- Dianna Gwilliams (born 1957), American-born official in the Church of England
- Dianna Hutts Aston (born 1964), American writer
- Dianna Ley (born 1984), Australian Paralympic swimmer
- Dianna Melrose (born 1952), Zimbabwe-born British diplomat
- Dianna Molzan, American painter
- Dianna Ortiz (1958–2021), American Catholic nun
- Dianna Russini (born 1983), American sports journalist
- DiAnna Schimek (born 1940), American politician
- Dianna Wolfson, American naval officer
- Dianna Xu, American mathematician and computer scientist
