= List of Cajuns =

This is a list of notable Cajuns, often from the Acadiana or the Greater New Orleans region of French Louisiana, though not limited in geographic origin. To be included in this list, the person must have a Wikipedia article showing they are Cajuns or Cajun descent.

== Academia ==
- Carl A. Brasseaux (born 1951), Cajun historian, writer; worked at University of Louisiana at Lafayette from 1975 until 2010.
- Ryan Brasseaux (born 1976), Cajun music historian; Dean of Davenport College at Yale University since 2011.
- Andrew Jolivette (born 1975), Sociologist, author, Professor of American Indian and Indigenous Studies UC Santa Barbara

== Actors, models, and entertainment ==
- Mary Katherine Campbell (1905-1990), beauty pageants, two-time Miss America pageant winner, 1922 and 1923
- Trishelle Cannatella (born 1979), American actress and model of Cajun ancestry
- Lacey Chabert (born 1982), actress, father is of Cajun descent
- Andrew Dismukes (born 1995), comedian and Saturday Night Live cast member
- Val Dufour (1927-2000), soap opera actor
- Jesse Duplantis (born 1949), Evangelical Charismatic Christian minister
- Lily Gladstone (born 1986), actress, mother is of Cajun descent
- Kyle Hebert (born 1969), actor
- Leigh Hennessy, film stunt performer, former gymnast and trampoline world champion
- Angela Kinsey (born 1971), actress most known for The Office
- Shia LaBeouf (born 1986), actor, father is of Cajun descent
- Ali Landry (born 1973), model, actress, 1996 Miss USA
- Lisa Landry, comedian, actress, writer
- Troy Landry, television personality on Swamp People
- Lash LaRue (1917-1996), actor, western motion picture star of the 1940s and 1950s
- Annie LeBlanc (born 2004), internet personality, YouTuber, actress, singer, and former gymnast.
- Jared Leto (born 1971), actor, musician, songwriter, director, artist; his maternal grandparents Metrejon were both of Cajun descent
- Shannon Leto (born 1970), actor, musician; his maternal grandparents Metrejon were both of Cajun descent
- Tyran Richard (born 1982), model, Playboy Playmate for March 2007.
- Zachary Richard (born 1950), musician, environmentalist, French language preservationist and founder of Action Cadienne
- Ian Somerhalder (born 1978), actor, father is of half Cajun descent
- Shane West (born 1978), American actor from Baton Rouge, Louisiana, best known for starring in A Walk To Remember, mother is of Cajun descent
Cajun actors

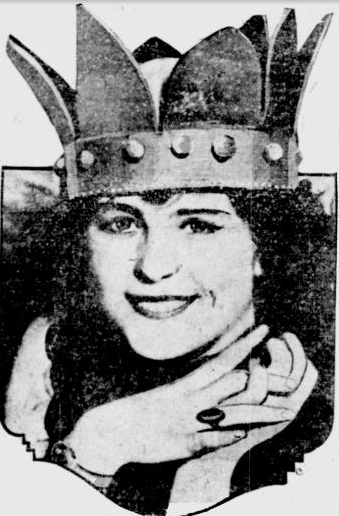

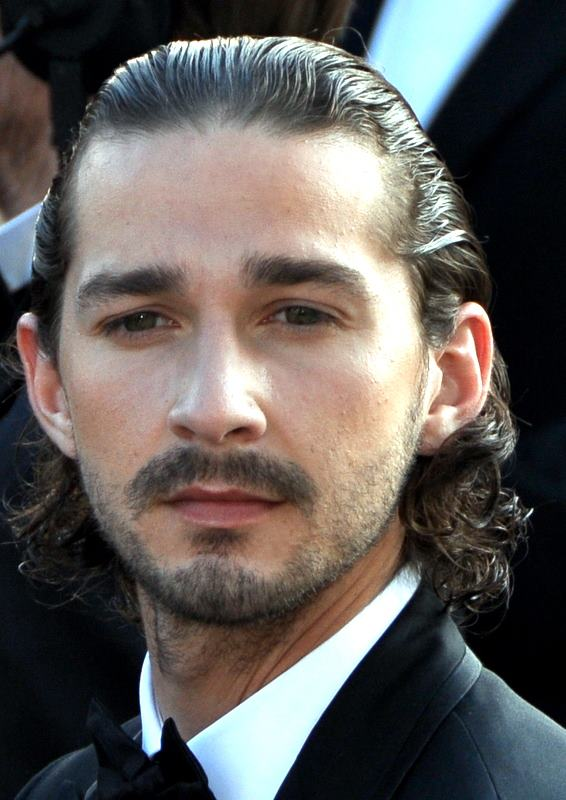

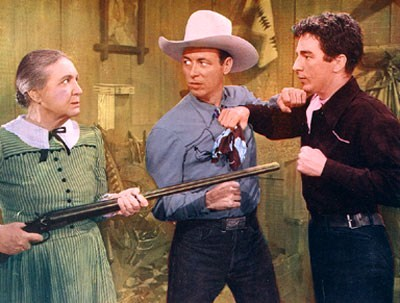

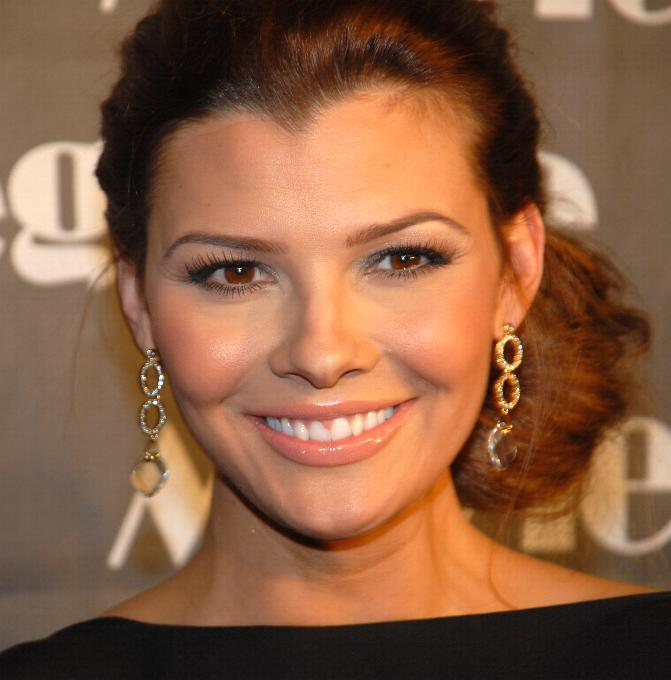

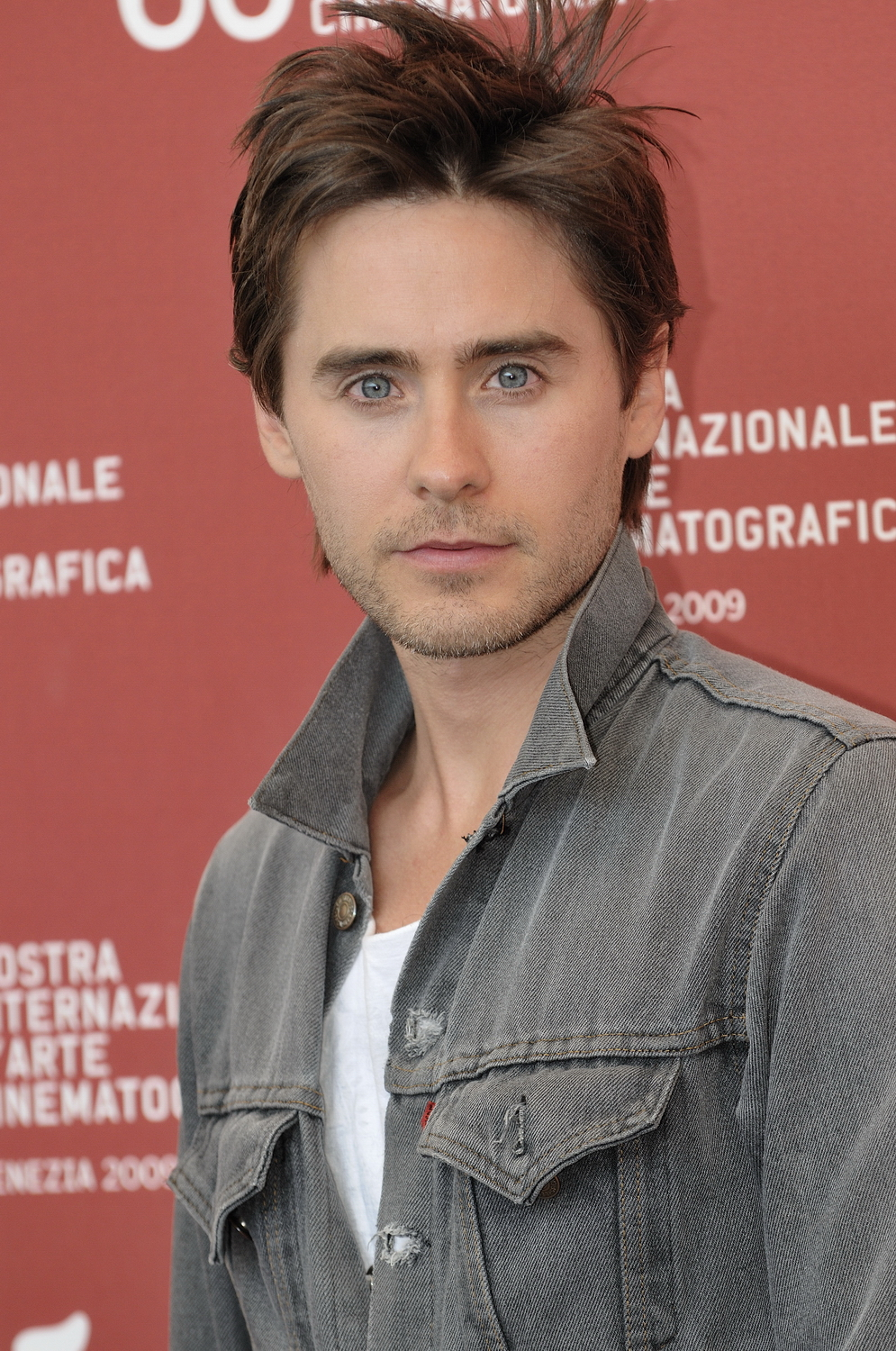

== Art, design ==
- Gladys Clark, Acadian weaver and spinner
- Joe Doucet, contemporary designer
- Elemore Morgan, Jr. (1931-2008), painter
- George Rodrigue (1944-2013), painter
- Floyd Sonnier (1933-2002), pen and ink artist, his work often depicted Cajun culture

== Chefs, restaurateurs ==
- John Folse (born 1946), Cajun chef, owner of several Louisiana restaurants
- Paul Prudhomme (1940-2015), chef of Cajun cuisine
- Justin Wilson (1914-2001), chef, comedian, storyteller

== Literature, writers, poets ==
- Barry Jean Ancelet (born 1951), writer, folklorist, linguist
- James Lee Burke (born 1936), writer
- Mary Alice Fontenot (1910-2003), children's author
- Camille Martin (born 1956), poet
- Matthew Randazzo V (born 1984), American true crime writer and historian known for his work on the American Mafia; born in New Orleans

== Military ==
- Claire Lee Chennault (1893-1958), Texas-born aviator who commanded the American Volunteer Group of the Chinese Air Force nicknamed the "Flying Tigers" during World War II, then served in the US Army Air Force, ultimately promoted to the rank of Major General, commanding the Fourteenth Air Force. After the war, Chennault founded the Civil Air Transport firm which would later be owned by the US Central Intelligence Agency and known as Air America
- Jefferson J. DeBlanc (1921-2007), World War II Marine Corps fighter pilot and ace; shot down nine Japanese aircraft during two tours of duty in the Pacific at Guadalcanal and Okinawa; Medal of Honor recipient; retired as a Colonel after serving as commander, Marine Air Reserve Group 18
- Robert B. Landry (1909-2000), Major General; Air Force aide to President Harry Truman, February 1948 to February 1953; chief of combat operations of the 8th Fighter Command; commanding officer of the 56th Fighter Group; director of fighters, Eighth Air Force; executive officer, 93rd Combat Wing (Heavy); and commanding officer, 493rd Bomb Group, Heavy; deputy commander of the Second Air Force, Strategic Air Command, at Barksdale Air Force Base until Feb. 1, 1955 when he assumed command of the Fourth Air Force at Hamilton Air Force Base, Calif.
- Alfred Mouton (1829-1864), Brigadier General, Confederate States Army during the American Civil War
- Oliver Naquin (1904-1989), Admiral, U.S. Navy (ret.), commander of the submarine USS Squalus during the Battle of Midway, and was present at the Japanese surrender which ended World War II
- Ronald G. Richard (born 1946) retired Marine Corps Major General and former Commanding General of Marine Corps Base Camp Lejeune
- Pierre Gustave Toutant-Beauregard (1818-1893), Brigadier General, Confederate States Army during the American Civil War

== Music ==
- Balfa Brothers, a cajun music band.
  - Dewey Balfa (1927-1992), on fiddle.
- Vin Bruce (1932-2018), singer-songwriter. Born in Cut Off, Louisiana. Was one of the first Cajun musicians to appear on the Louisiana Hayride and Grand Ole Opry. Was known as "the King of Cajun Singers" Also, known for 1961 Jole Blon and 1979 Cajun Country songs.
- Lee Benoit (born 1959), accordion player and singer
- Nathan Abshire (1913-1981), Cajun accordion player
- Al Berard (1960-2014), Cajun fiddler, guitarist, singer-songwriter
- Amie Comeaux (1976-1997), country music singer
- Michael Doucet (born 1951) founder of the Cajun band BeauSoleil
- Beyonce Knowles-Carter (born 1981), direct descendant of Acadian rebellion leader Joseph Broussard
- Edwin Duhon (1910-2006), musician and co-founder of the Hackberry Ramblers
- Cléoma Falcon (1906-1941), Cajun guitarist and vocalist, known for being the wife of Joe Falcon as well as being one of the first people to record Cajun music
- Joe Falcon (1900-1965), American accordionist known for being one of the first people to record Cajun music
- Mary Gauthier (born 1962), folk singer-songwriter
- Hunter Hayes (born 1991), accordion player and singer, both parents of part Cajun descent
- Beau Jocque (1953-1999), singer and accordionist
- Doug Kershaw (born 1936), singer-songwriter, fiddler
- Sammy Kershaw (born 1958), country music singer; candidate for Louisiana Lt. Governor
- Huey P. Meaux (1929-2011), songwriter, music producer, nicknamed "The Crazy Cajun"
- Addison Rae (born 2000), singer, actress, and social media personality
- Amanda Shaw (born 1990), singer, fiddler and actress
- Wayne Toups (born 1958), musician
- Jo-El Sonnier (born 1946), musician
Cajuns in music

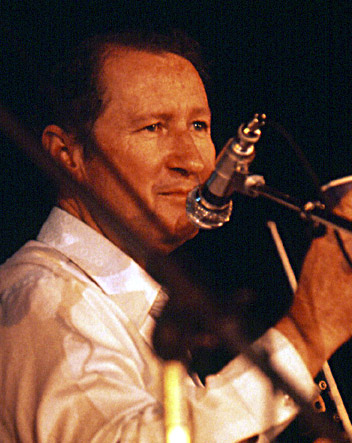

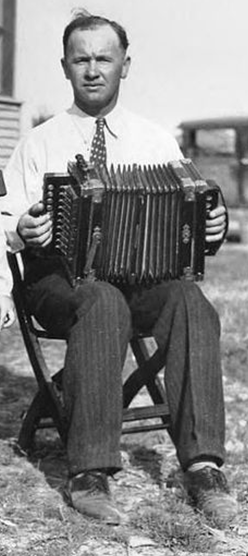

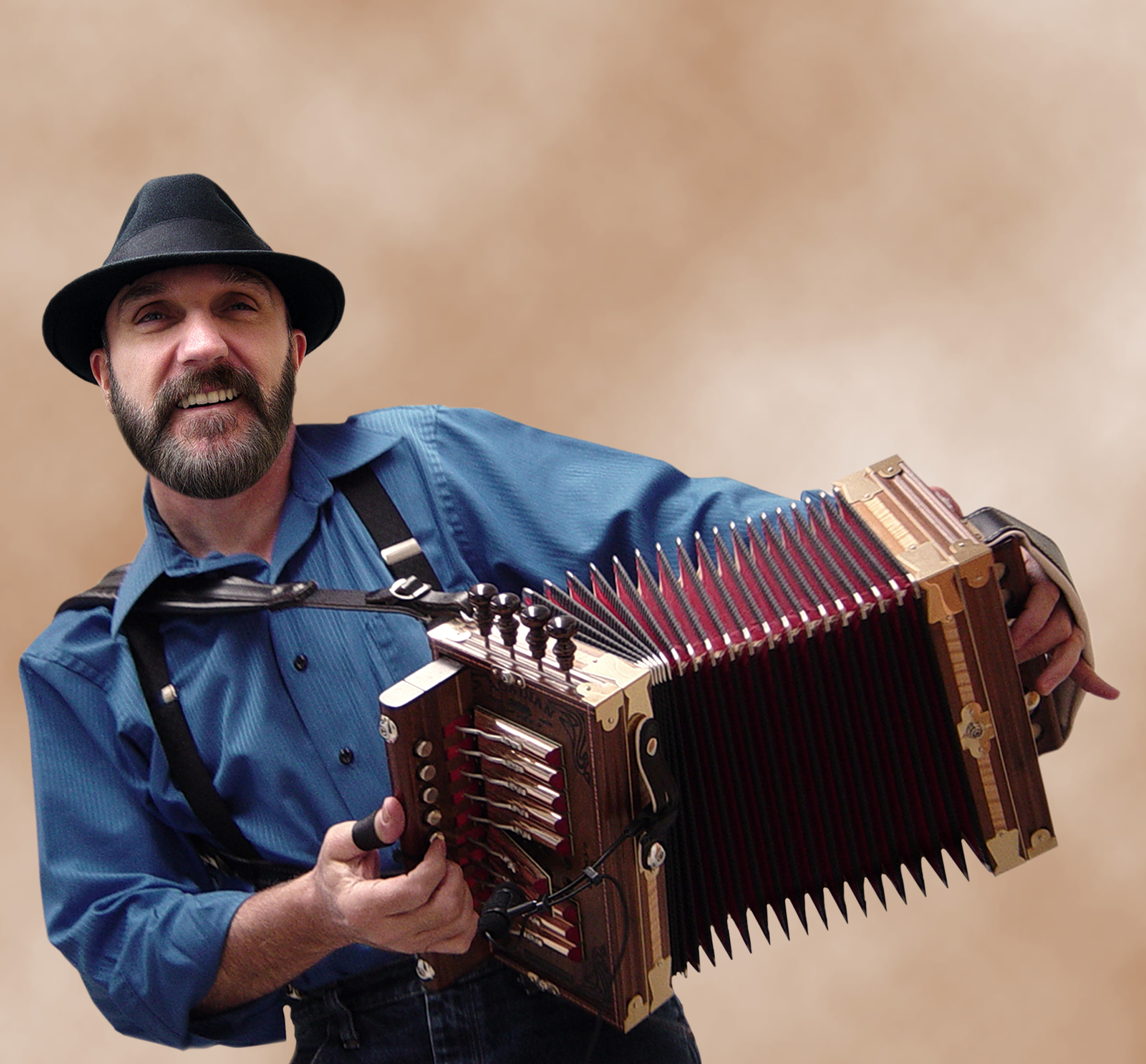

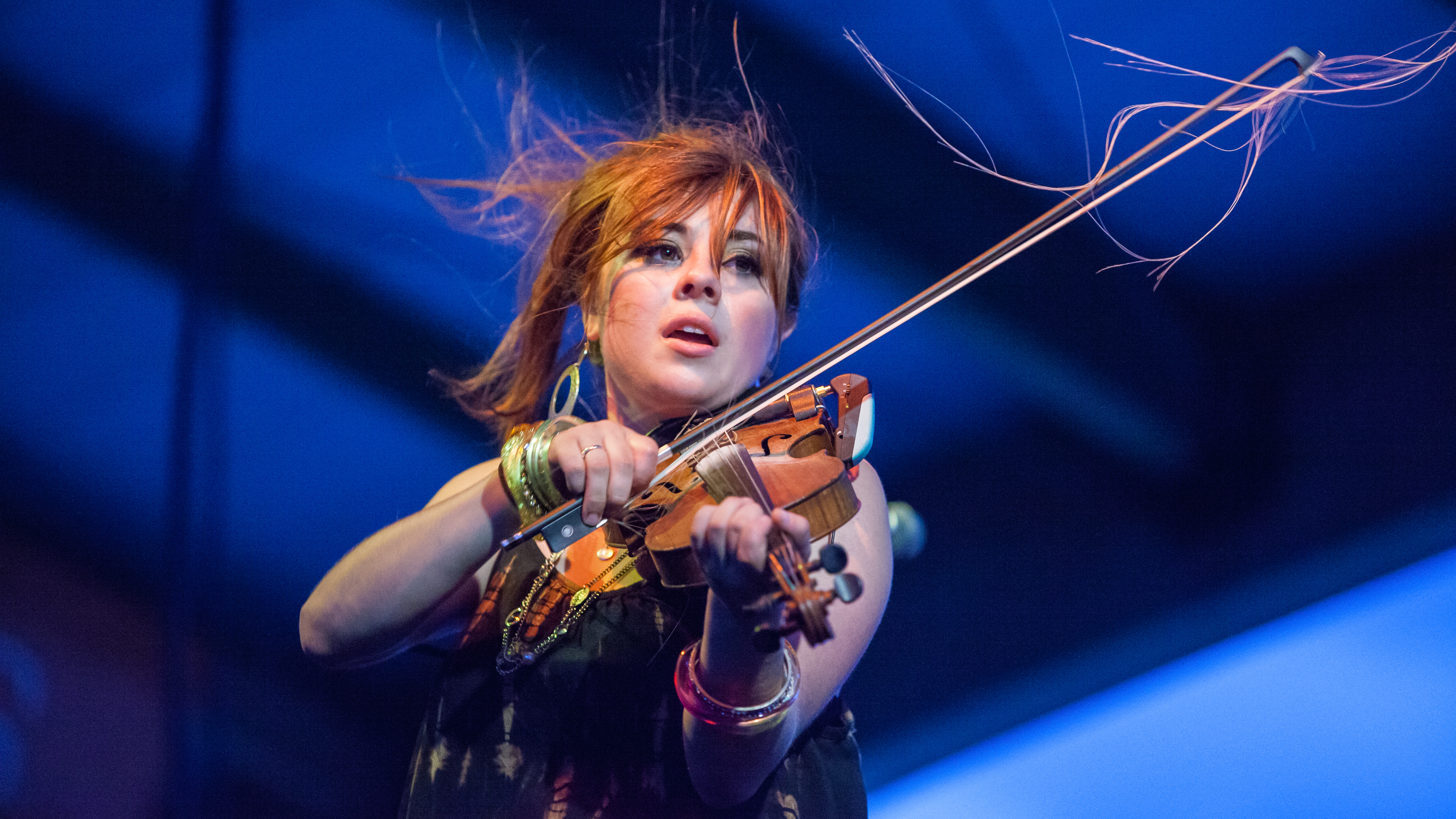

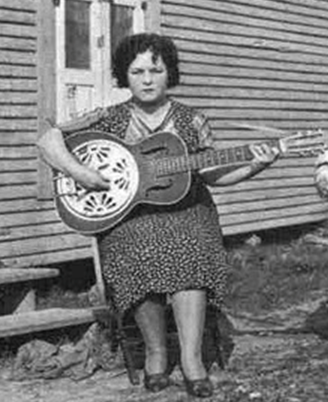

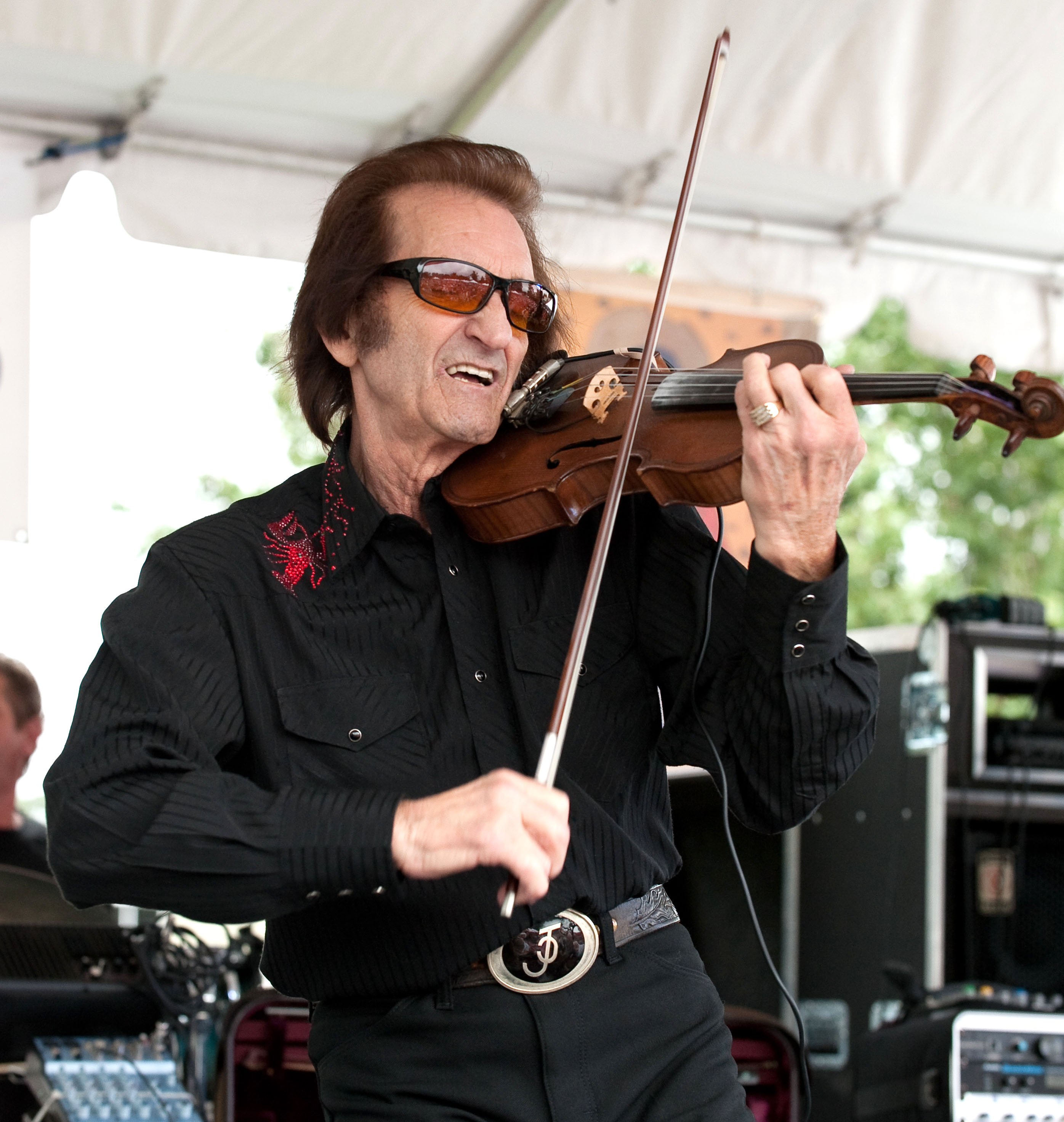

== Politics, law ==
- Kathleen Blanco (1942-2019), former Louisiana Governor
- John Breaux (born 1944), former Louisiana U.S. Senator
- Joseph Broussard (1702-1765), led Cajuns from Acadia into Louisiana
- Jeff Landry (born 1970), 57th governor of Louisiana
- James Carville (born 1944), political strategist
- Paul N. Cyr (1878-1946), Lieutenant Governor in the Huey Pierce Long, Jr. administration
- Reggie Dupre (born 1957), Terrebonne Parish public official
- Edwin Edwards (1927-2021), governor of Louisiana
- Firmin Breaux (1749-1808), founder of the city of Breaux Bridge, Louisiana
- F. Edward Hebert (1901-1979), former Congressman, Chairman of Armed Services Committee
- Charlie Melancon (born 1947), U.S. congressman
- Billy Tauzin (born 1943), politician

== Space Flight ==
- Hayley Arceneaux (born 1991), Chief Medical Officer on the Inspiration4 mission and child osteosarcoma survivor

== Sports ==
- Ronald Ardoin (born 1957), retired horse racing jockey
- Caleb Blanchard (born 1987), bodybuilding champion and fitness model
- Calvin Borel (born 1966), hall of fame jockey
- Don Breaux (born 1940), former NFL quarterback
- Reid Brignac (born 1986), self-proclaimed "Cajun God of Baseball", shortstop for the Tampa Bay Rays, born in St. Amant, Louisiana
- Bubby Brister (born 1962), former NFL quarterback for the Steelers, Eagles, Broncos
- Fred Broussard (born 1933), former NFL and AFL offensive lineman
- Anthony Clement (born 1976), former NFL offensive lineman
- Chase Clement (born 1989), former LSU and NFL tight end
- Roy Corcoran (born 1980), baseball pitcher for the Houston Astros
- Lance Cormier (born 1980), baseball pitcher
- Eddie Delahoussaye (born 1951), hall of fame jockey
- Jake Delhomme (born 1975), former NFL quarterback
- Kent Desormeaux (born 1970), hall of fame jockey
- Michael Desormeaux (born 1985), former NFL and CFL quarterback and current head football coach at the University of Louisiana at Lafayette
- Shane Dronett (1971-2009), professional football player, Cajun paternal grandparents
- Armand Duplantis (born 1999), pole vaulter, born in Lafayette, Louisiana, is of Cajun descent by his father Greg
- Ernie Duplechin (1932-2020), former head football coach and athletic director at McNeese State University
- Mike Fontenot (born 1980), Philadelphia Phillies baseball player
- Hoyle Granger (born 1944), former NFL and AFL running back
- Eric Guerin (1924-1993), hall of fame jockey
- Lance Guidry (born 1971), defensive coordinator at the University of Miami
- Ron Guidry (born 1950), former baseball player
- Bobby Hebert (born 1960), former NFL quarterback
- Griffin Hebert (born 1999), NFL wide receiver
- Jay Hebert (1923-1997), former professional golfer and winner of the 1960 PGA Championship; brother of Lionel Hebert
- Lionel Hebert (1928-2000), former professional golfer and winner of the 1957 PGA Championship; brother of Jay Hebert
- Leigh Hennessy, world champion gymnast
- Tom Landry (1924-2000), coach, Dallas Cowboys
- Stefan LeFors (born 1981), football quarterback
- John LeRoux (born 1976), professional wrestler
- Gil Meche (born 1978), baseball pitcher for the Kansas City Royals
- Ed Orgeron (born 1961), LSU Tigers head football coach
- Xavier Paul (born 1985), Cincinnati Reds outfielder
- Bob Pettit (1932–2026), hall of fame basketball forward
- Andy Pettitte (born 1972), starting pitcher for the New York Yankees
- Dustin Poirier (born 1989), mixed martial artist
- Tony Robichaux (1961-2019), former head baseball coach at McNeese State and Louisiana-Lafayette
- Randy Romero (1957-2019), Hall of Fame horse jockey
- Ryan Theriot (born 1979), infielder for the Chicago Cubs, born in Baton Rouge, Louisiana

== See also ==
- List of Acadians
- List of French Americans
- List of Louisiana Creoles
- List of people related to Cajun music
- French-Canadian Americans
