= Brasseaux =

Brasseaux is a surname. Notable people with the surname include:

- Carl A. Brasseaux (born 1951), American historian and educator
- Ryan Brasseaux (born 1976), American academic, son of Carl
