= Booher =

Booher is a surname. Notable people with the surname include:

- Charles F. Booher, (1848–1921), U.S. Representative from Missouri
- Charles T. Booher (1959–2005), American engineer
- Darwin L. Booher (1942–2025), American politician from Michigan
- Dee Booher (1948–2022), American actress, wrestler, and roller derby skater
- Dianna Booher (born 1948), American author and communications consultant
