= Sound on Sound Fest =

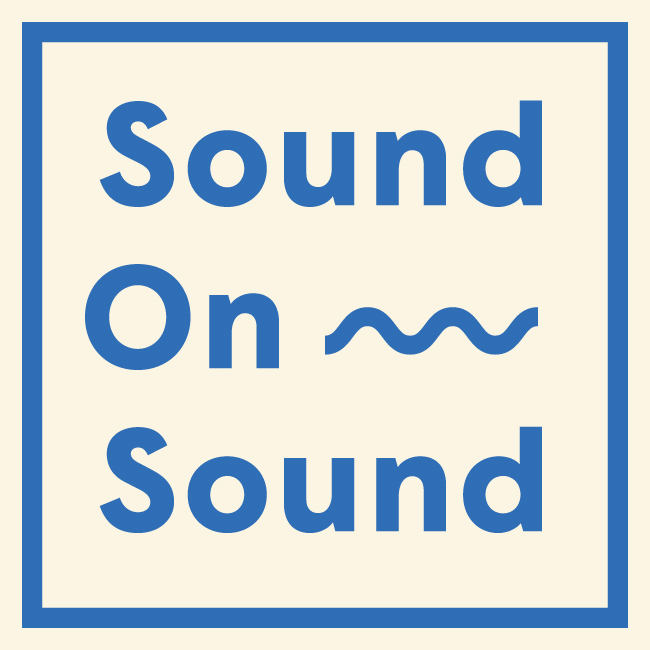
- Genre: Indie rock, punk rock, hardcore punk, hip hop
- Dates: Early November
- Locations: Sherwood Forest Faire, McDade, Texas
- Years active: 2016-2017
- Founders: Margin Walker Presents; Graham Williams
- Website: soundonsoundfest.com

Sound on Sound Fest (often abbreviated as SOS Fest) was a three-day music, comedy, action sports and camping festival held 35 miles east of downtown Austin, Texas, at the Sherwood Forest Faire, home to an annual renaissance fair, and medieval-style village, set on 23 acres and located in the heart of the Lost Pines Forest region of Central Texas.

SOS Fest celebrated its inaugural year November 4–6, 2016 with notable performers such as Beach House, Phantogram, Young Thug, Courtney Barnett, Death Grips, Tim Heidecker and more.

Founded by Graham Williams's Austin-based promotions company Margin Walker Presents and produced by Funhouse Services and Sound on Sound Event Services, SOS Fest was home to three music stages showcasing emerging and established talent from the worlds of indie, punk, hip hop, metal, and dance music, as well as comedy.

Created by Graham Williams and much of the same team behind the long-running Fun Fun Fun Fest, SOS Fest aimed to bring the same Austin-centric culture to the forest by including many local businesses, food trucks, restaurants and nonprofits as official vendors of the fest.

With a fan focus, SOS took the festival beyond the music with a comedy and live-panel discussion stage, a skateboard and BMX halfpipe, a wrestling ring, a disco dungeon, and 15 acres of camping. The festival also incorporated the renaissance theme of Sherwood Forest Faire into the daily fest activities with period actors roaming the grounds, jousting, turkey legs, and SOS Fest's own fire-breathing dragon that lives at the top of the main stage.

SOS Fest was scheduled to return for its second year on November 10–12, 2017 at Sherwood Forest, but was canceled by organizers on October 6.

== Lineup ==
=== 2016 ===
==== Friday ====
- Phantogram
- Descendents
- Thundercat
- Run the Jewels
- Fidlar
- Thee Oh Sees
- Hinds
- Touche Amore
- Death Grips
- Guided By Voices
- Empress Of
- Turnstile
- The Range
- Denzel Curry
- Clipping.
- Beach Slang
- Cursive
- Into It Over It
- Good Riddance
- Shannon and the Clams
- SWMRS
- Planes Mistaken for Stars
- Diet Cig
- Magna Carda
- War on Women
- Calliope Musicals
- Protextor
- Piñata Protest
- Boyfrndz
- Drug Church
- This is Spinal Tap
- Todd Barry
- Johnny Pemberton
- Yung Jake
- One Night Stand Dating Game
- The Needle Drop Podcast
- SOS Live Podcast
- Laugh Dammit

==== Saturday ====
- Purity Ring
- Boys Noize
- Dillinger Escape Plan
- Aesop Rock
- Youth of Today
- Beach House
- Flag
- Girls Against Boys
- Metz
- Jagwar Ma
- Big Boi
- Deerhunter
- Car Seat Headrest
- Diarrhea Planet
- Pouya
- Health
- Small Black
- Alex G
- Dead Milkmen
- Wild Nothing
- Bleached
- American Sharks
- The Relationship
- Orthy
- Radioactivity
- Hardproof
- Tiny Moving Parts
- Us Weekly
- Moving Panoramas
- Anya
- Culture Abuse
- Statesman Shots Podcast
- Tim Heidecker
- Joe Mande
- Air Sex Championships
- Turned Out A Punk
- SOS Live Podcast
- Catherine & Ryan's Wedding
- Fragile Rock

==== Sunday ====
- Explosions in the Sky
- A-Trak
- Carcass
- Courtney Barnett
- Big Freedia
- Baroness
- STRFKR
- Protomartyr
- Young Thug
- Bob Mould
- White Lung
- Thursday
- Baio
- The Monkey Wrench
- Kero Kero Bonito
- Cherubs
- Recover
- Open Mike Eagle
- Old Man Gloom
- Youth Code
- The Frights
- Bully
- Night Drive
- Illustrations
- Leopold & His Fiction
- Boombaptist
- Die Young
- Emily Wolfe
- Psychic Twin
- Sailor Poon
