= Charles Booker =

Charles Booker may refer to:

- Charles Booker (American politician) (born 1984), member of the Kentucky House of Representatives
- Charles Dawson Booker (1897–1918), English World War I fighter ace
- Charles Goodenough Booker (1859–1926), Canadian politician, mayor of Hamilton, Ontario from 1917 to 1920
- Charles Joseph Booker (1865–1925), Australian politician, member of the Queensland Legislative Assembly

== See also ==
- Charles Booher (disambiguation)
- Charles Brooker (1932–2020), Canadian ice hockey player
