= Applicator =

Applicator Applicators may refer to:

- The Applicators, an American pop punk band
- A tool to put tubal ligation clips in place
- Electron beam collimator component in some devices
