= Sonnier =

Sonnier is a surname. Notable people with the surname include:

- Dallas Sonnier (born 1980), American film producer, publisher, and entrepreneur
- Elmo Patrick Sonnier (1950–1984), American murderer and rapist
- Floyd Sonnier (1933–2002), American Cajun artist
- J. Bert Sonnier (born 1938), American thoroughbred trainer
- Jo-El Sonnier (born 1946), American singer-songwriter and accordionist
- Keith Sonnier (1941–2020), American sculptor, performance artist, video and light artist
