= Sherwood Forest Faire =

Annual Renaissance fair in McDade, Texas

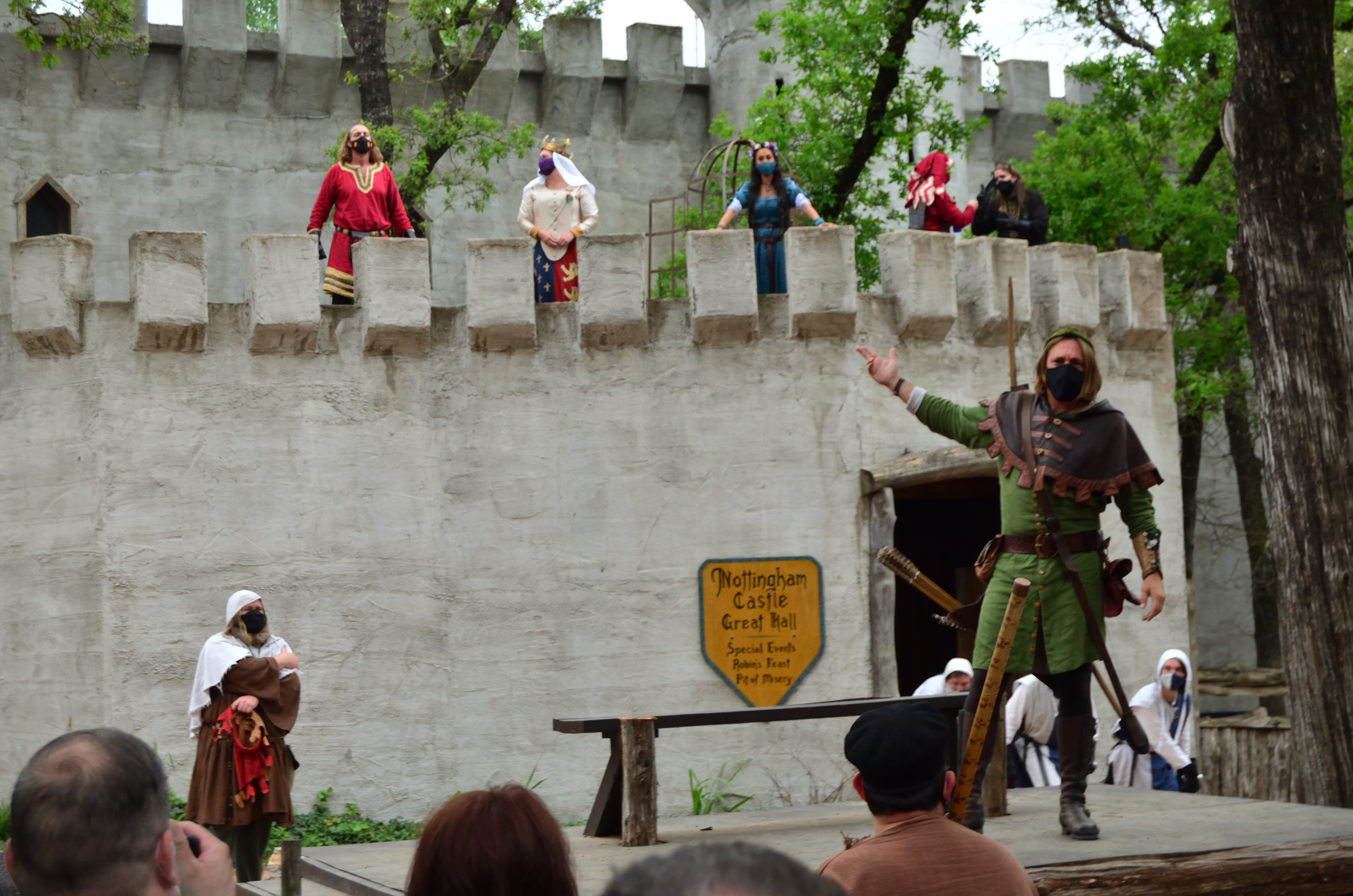
- Performance featuring Robin Hood
- Genre: Renaissance fair
- Dates: Weekends in March and April
- Location: 1883 Old Hwy 20 McDade, Texas 78650
- Inaugurated: 2010
- Area: 23 acres
- Website: www.sherwoodforestfaire.com

Sherwood Forest Faire is an annual Renaissance fair in McDade, Texas.

== History ==
Sherwood Forest Faire, LLC was established in 2008 by George Appling and Eric Todd. The first annual festival took place in 2010 and was set in the year 1189; each subsequent year of the festival is set one year later. The 2020 festival was cancelled due to the COVID-19 pandemic, and fair performers created virtual content to entertain would-be visitors. The festival returned in 2021 but was delayed by one month, taking place during April and May.

== Features ==
As of 2024, the event features 170 artisans and 150 daily live shows, including a falconry demonstration, improv troupes, belly dancers, and musicians. Many of the Sherwood Forest Faire's shows and attractions are inspired by Robin Hood. For example, the Sherwood Forest Players perform theatrical skits throughout the day featuring characters such as Robin Hood, Maid Marian, and the Sheriff of Nottingham. These performances are connected to an overarching storyline that changes each year.

== Other events ==
Because the structures associated with Sherwood Forest Faire are permanent and stay on the property year-round, the grounds are used for other historical and fantasy events in addition to the annual Renaissance fair. The site hosts summer camps for children and adults and an annual Celtic Music Festival & Highland Games festivities in December. Throughout the year, the grounds are the site of Hynafol, a series of immersive live action role playing events organized by The Texas Larp Company culminating in a five-day festival in November.

In 2016, the Sherwood Forest Faire site hosted the Sound on Sound Fest music festival, the successor to Austin's annual Fun Fun Fun Fest. According to festival organizers, the event was scheduled to take place at the site the following year until prominent investor backed out. As of 2024, the music festival has not returned to Sherwood Forest Faire or any other location.

== Gallery ==
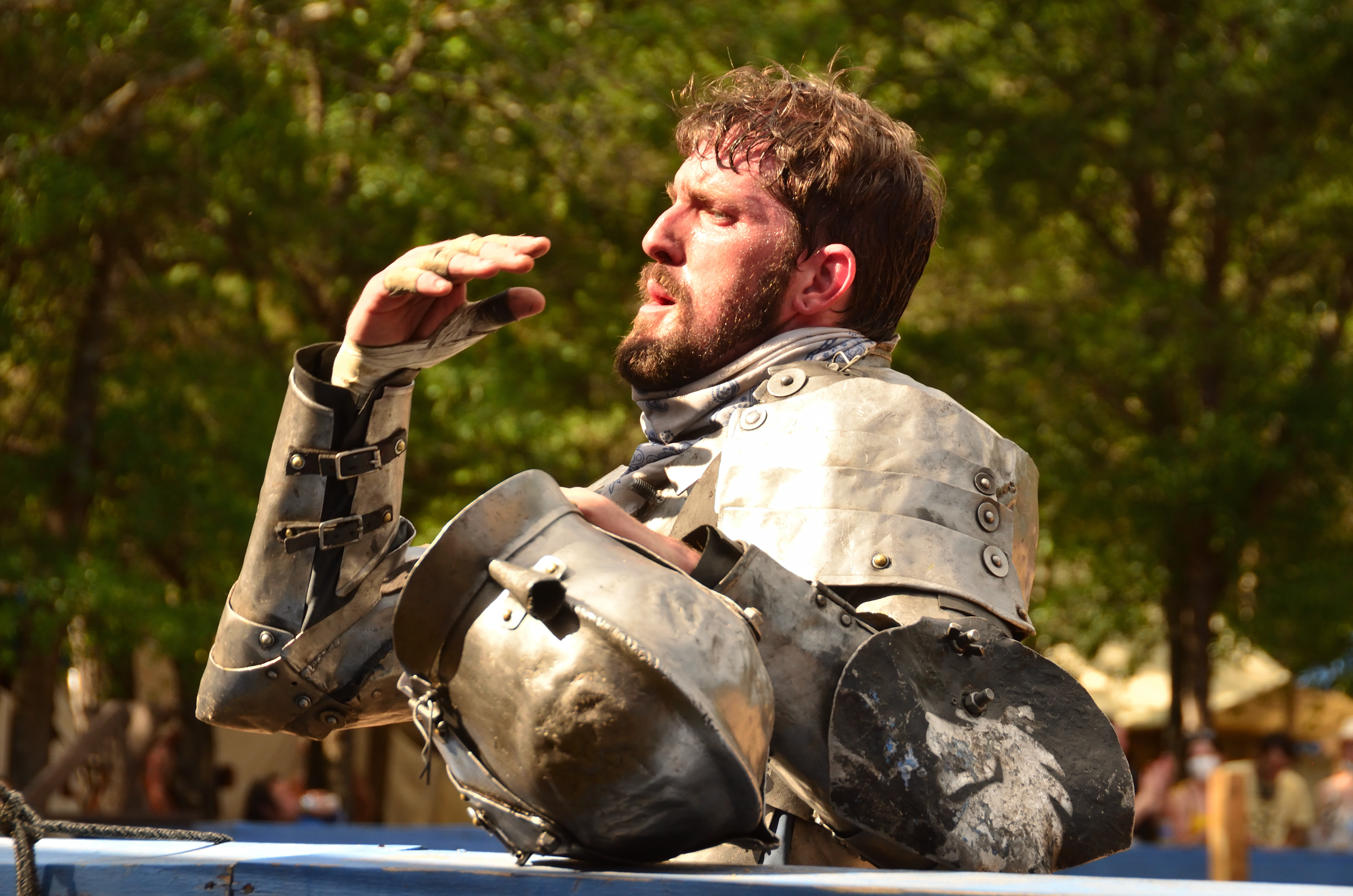
Performer dressed as a knight

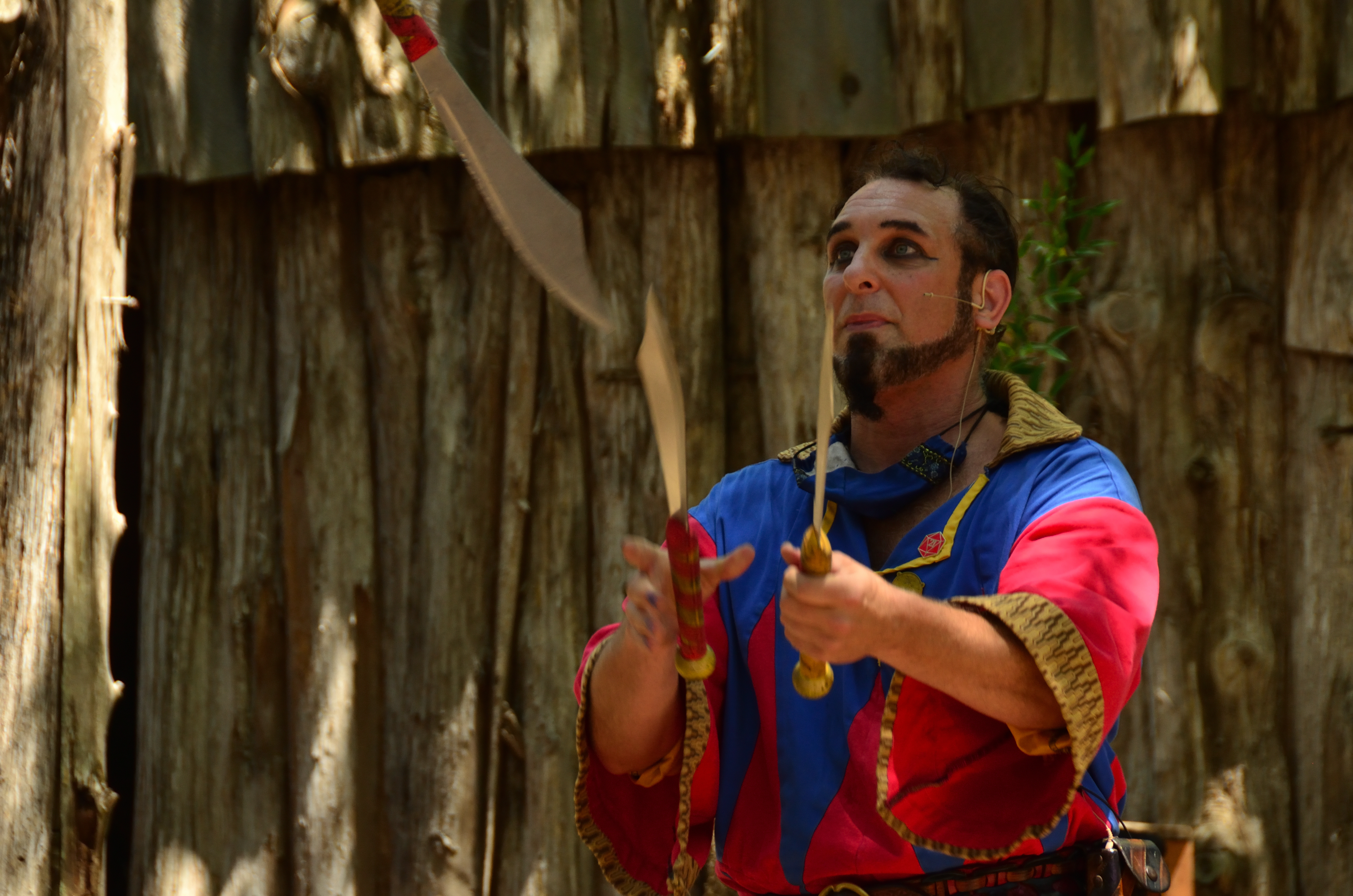
Costumed performer juggling swords

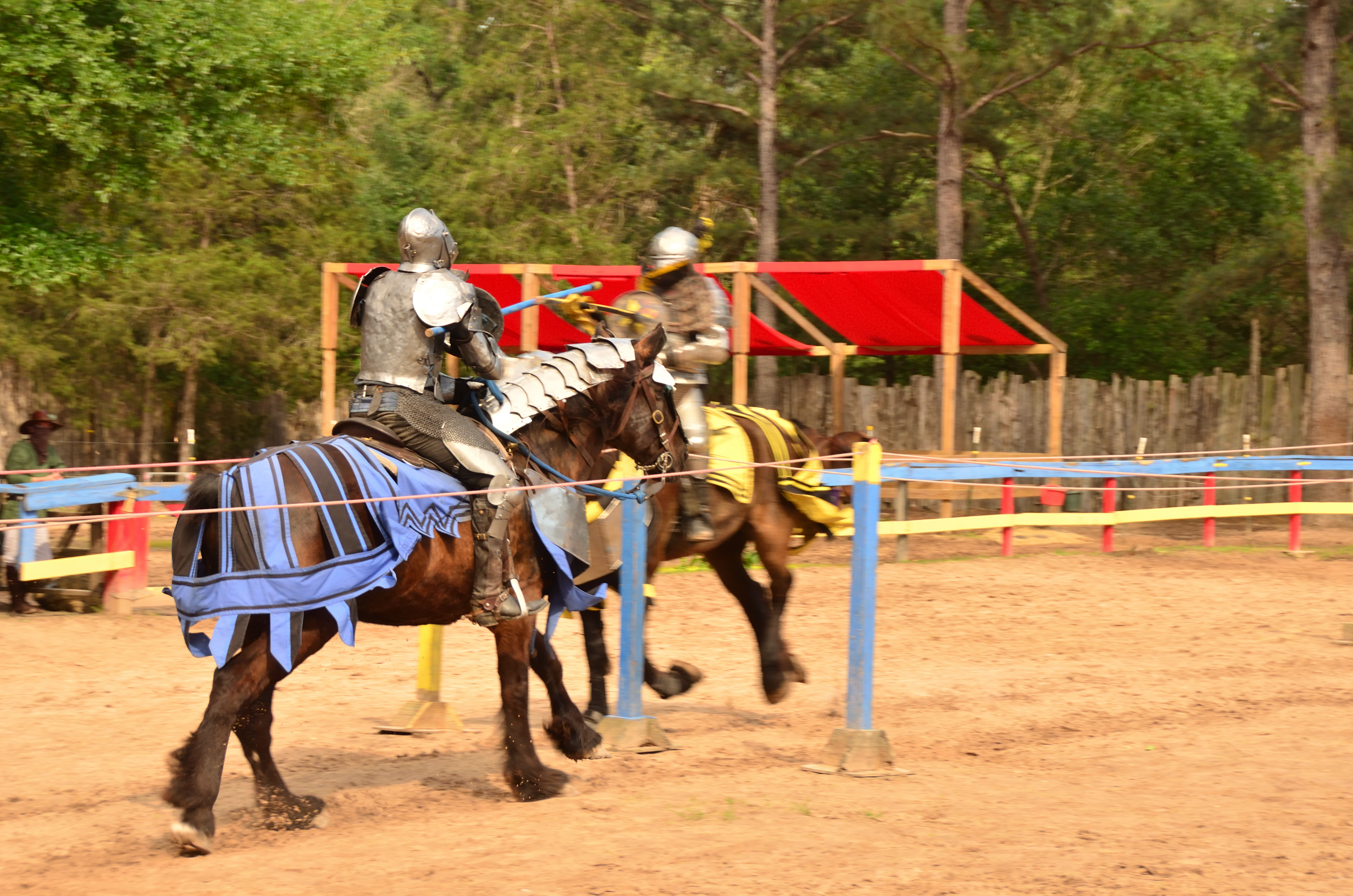
Knights reenacting a joust

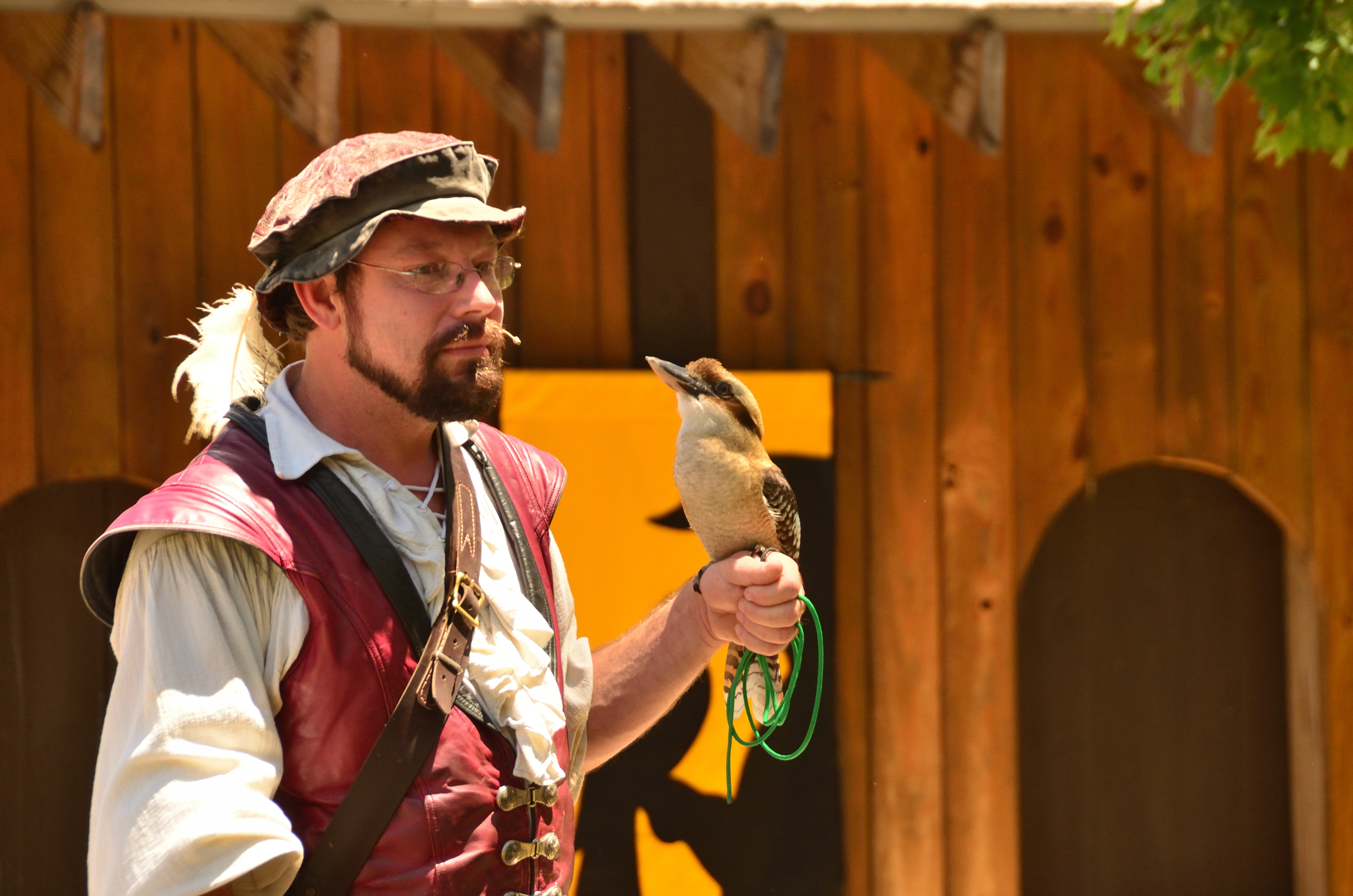
Falconry demonstration

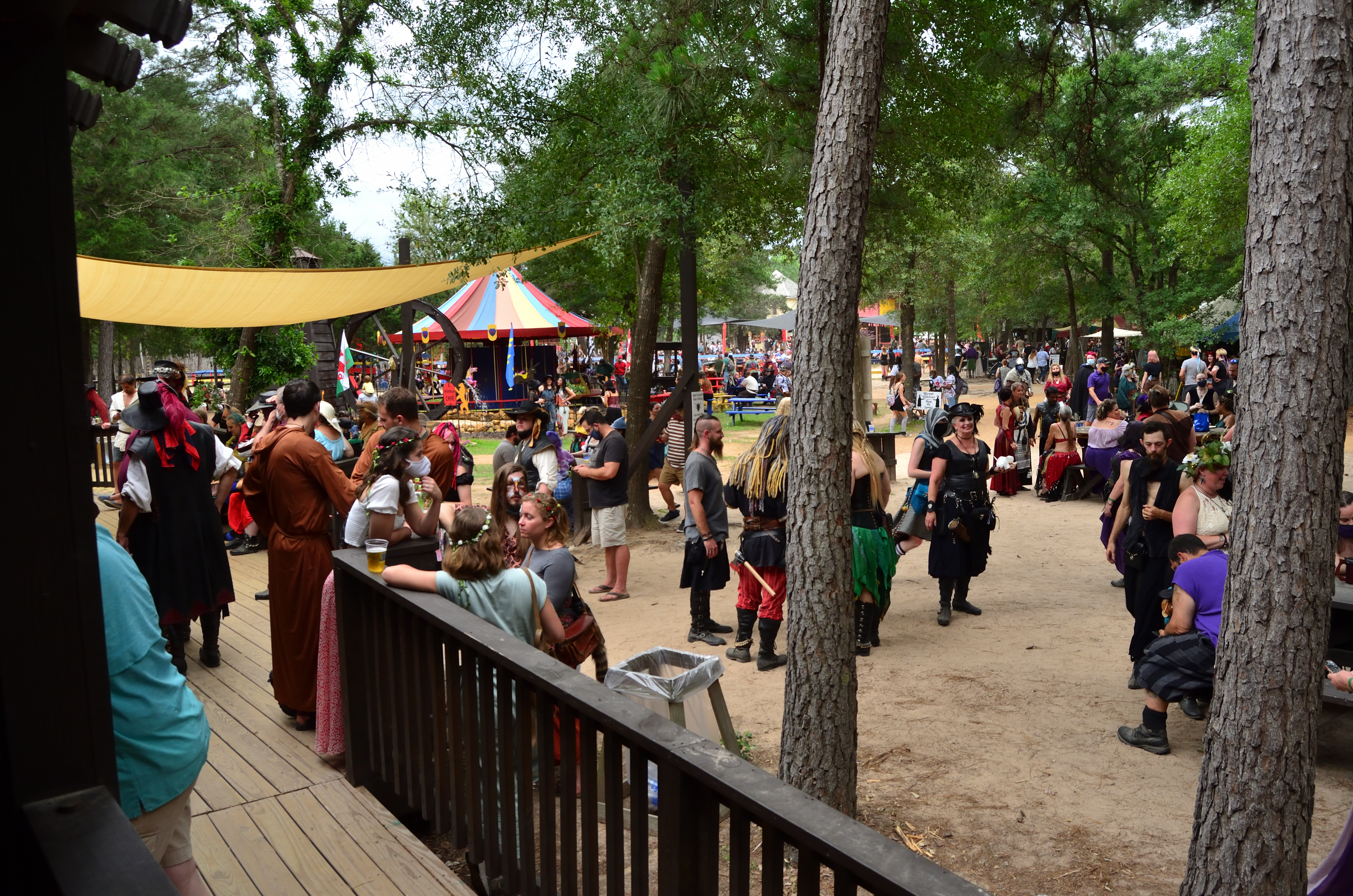
Festival attendees in costume

== See also ==
- List of Renaissance fairs
