= Lisa Landry =

American comedian

Lisa Landry (born August 5) is an American comedian, actress and writer.

== Early life ==
Lisa Landry grew up in Harvey, Louisiana. Her mother served in the United States Navy and was often stationed in other countries leaving Lisa and her little brother for months at a time to be raised by their father and grandparents. Landry is Cajun and dreamed of studying theater in New York and was so dedicated to getting into the American Musical and Dramatic Academy that she flew from New Orleans to Atlanta to audition for their acting program.

== Career ==
Lisa Landry began her stand-up comedy career in the New York City comedy circuit where she honed her comedic skills in some of the very best venues in the country including Comedy Cellar, Comic Strip Live, and Gotham Comedy Club. It was in New York City where she met and married her husband. They divorced. While living in Manhattan, Lisa gave birth to a little boy, whom she named Ari Cajun Shapiro because she knew she'd made a Spicy Jew.

Lisa Landry starred in her own half-hour special Comedy Central Presents: Lisa Landry while pregnant with Ari. Immediately following birthing her special and birthing her child, Lisa appeared on CMT's 20 Greatest Redneck Moments. Which got her featured in TV Guide as a "Top Pick" and also selected by TBS to appear in their "We Know Funny" commercials. Her special was chosen third by a nationwide vote in Comedy Central's "Standup Showdown" and she appeared on CBS's "The Late, Late Show with Craig Ferguson" where she received a standing ovation.

Landry was offered not one, but two residencies in Las Vegas. Landry headlined her own nightly show at The Stratosphere when she was offered her own headline show at Planet Hollywood.

Lisa Landry has appeared on "Law and Order: SVU", "Comics Unleashed", "Stand up in Stiletto's" (she wore cowgirl boots), E!'s "Top 100 Celebrities", "Red Eye (TV series)", "The Bonnie Hunt Show", "The Bob & Tom Show", "The Steve and Preston Show", "Premium Blend", and recently co-hosted "Better Connecticut". Landry was filmed for the "Vegas" episode of the A&E Series produced by Ellen DeGeneres called "Little Funny". The reality show about the eleven-year-old comedian Saffron Herndon was filmed but A&E decided not to air it. Landry was a performer on the Brett Butler's Southern Belles of Comedy DVD in 2012. Landry was also a comedy writer for Us Weekly. Lisa Landry was offered the first-ever talent holding deal with Lifetime Television.

Landry's CD "Put Your Keys in the Keybowl" was selected as one of the Top Ten Best Comedy CDs on iTunes (2008). "Put Your Keys in the Keybowl" was also included that same year (2008) in the Top Ten Best by Punchline Magazine (since rebranded as LaughSpin) describes Landry best: "She's an incredibly skilled comedian, a controlling presence onstage and a master of pacing and delivery." Her follow-up project was the DVD "Brazillionaire". Landry has since released two more albums. Her comedy albums are enjoyed on various platforms throughout the planet including but not limited to iTunes, Amazon, Spotify, Pandora, Today's Comedy, SiriusXM Satellite Radio, and her official website.

Lisa Landry is now the host of her new podcast, WOMENACE to SOCIETY where she conducts socially relevant interviews of artists, activists, anarchists, dreamers, and doers from across America. The podcast can best be described as "Real People. Real Stories. Unreal World. Laughter Heals. Love One Another."

== See also ==
- List of Cajuns
- List of people from Louisiana
- List of stand-up comedians
