= Action Cadienne =

Non-profit organization

- Formation: April 1996
- Type: Non-profit organization
- Region served: Louisiana, United States
- Website: Action Cadienne website

Action Cadienne (literally "Cajun Action"), founded in April 1996, is a non-profit organization in the United States whose purpose is to preserve, promote and defend the French language, francophonie and the Acadian or Cadien (Cajun) culture within the state of Louisiana.

== Manifesto ==
"We believe strongly that our identity as well as our heritage, is fundamentally linked to the French language, and our primary mission is to promote the language itself, and to gain recognition of the linguistic rights of the Cadien people. The French language has been, and continues to be, an essential element of Louisiana culture in spite of its oppression during the last fifty years."

== French immersion ==
Action Cadienne advocates state funded French immersion courses, especially within the Parishes of Acadiana where Cajuns predominate.

"French immersion is the only truly effective means of teaching the language. Immersion programs are not only cost effective, but have proven to be good education: French immersion students have scored in the top 20% on battery exams in general subjects in English! The benefits to the culture generally, and to the tourist economy in particular, are too obvious to enumerate. Suffice it to say that a new generation of Cadien children speaking the language of their ancestors is the hope of the Cadien people and a resource which the people of Louisiana cannot afford to lose."

== See also ==
- List of Cajuns
- French Louisiana
- List of Louisiana parishes by French-speaking population
- French Canadians
- Quebec
- Zachary Richard
- CODOFIL
- French in the United States
- Language revival
- List of Louisiana parishes by French-speaking population
