= Charles Booher =

Charles Booher may refer to:

- Charles F. Booher (1848–1921), U.S. Representative from Missouri
- Charles T. Booher (1959–2005), American engineer
