= Graham Williams (promoter) =

American music promoter (born 1978)

Graham Williams (born January 15, 1978) is a concert promoter based in Austin, Texas. He founded and operated Fun Fun Fun Fest and Sound on Sound Fest until their end, and has run several companies that booked shows in Texas. Currently he is the CEO of Resound Presents.

== Early life ==
Graham Williams was born on January 15, 1978. When he was in sixth grade, his sister took him to a live music show, which got him interested in the scene. He graduated from Austin High School. While attending, he would book shows with bands, getting only enough ticket sales to pay the venue back and save a little.

== Career ==
From 1999 to 2007, he worked at Emo's, first as a security guard, but his responsibilities eventually included booking shows. After overbooking one December night in 2006, shows from Peaches, Circle Jerks, Spoon, and Dead Meadow were scheduled to play without a stage. Failing to send them elsewhere because of holidays, he decided to create his own show using those bands for a one-time, one day festival in Waterloo Park, working with Tim League. Despite the one-off intentions, it became an annual event, and he left his job at Emo's to found a company called Transmission Events to run the festival. By 2010 it expanded to a 3 day festival.

Amid disputes with the city of Austin, as well as other problems, Fun Fun Fun Fest had its last iteration in 2015, Williams having left Transmission in early 2016. He founded a new company, Margin Walker, with much of the same staff. According to Williams' estimate, Margin Walker booked 900 shows in 2019. Margin Walker also put on Sound on Sound Fest in 2016 and 2017. Margin Walker shut down in 2020 while the COVID-19 pandemic ravaged the live music industry. In 2021, Williams founded a new brand called Resound Entertainment and slowly recovered their ground from pandemic losses, booking 500-600 shows as of 2025.

== Personal life ==
Williams is married to Audrie San Miguel, owner of an Austin vintage store. He is the brother of Celeste Quesada, the founder of Cine Las Americas and, through her, the brother-in-law of Adrian Quesada.
