= McDade Independent School District =

School district in Texas, United States

Address
- 156 Marlin Street McDade, Texas, 78650; United States

District information
- Type: Public
- Grades: PreK–12
- NCES District ID: 4829760

Students and staff
- Students: 334
- Teachers: 32.73 (FTE)
- Staff: 33.58 (FTE)
- Student–teacher ratio: 10.2

Other information
- Website: www.mcdadeisd.com

McDade Independent School District is a public school district based in the community of McDade, Texas, USA.

The district has two schools - McDade Elementary - that serves students in grades pre-kindergarten through 5th, Middle School grades 6th through 8th and McDade High School, which is designated for grades 7-12.

In 2009, the school district was rated "academically acceptable" by the Texas Education Agency.

== History ==
The district had its own high school until the 1920s after a fire destroyed its designated building. Until circa 2016 the district sent its high school students to the Elgin Independent School District, and to the Bastrop Independent School District.

The district had 245 students enrolled in fall 2015.

In the summer of 2016 the district had 330 students scheduled to attend beginning in the fall. The high school was scheduled to re-open, for the first time in many years, on August 23, 2016 with grades 7-10. As of 2016 the school uses the athletic property of TRIBE Consolidated Athletics as its home American football stadium since McDade ISD had not yet built its own football facilities. Students may take university-level classes at Temple College. The first principal of McDade High is Paul Smith; As of 2016 he also serves as the high school's athletic director.
