= McDade Pottery =

American ceramics manufacturer

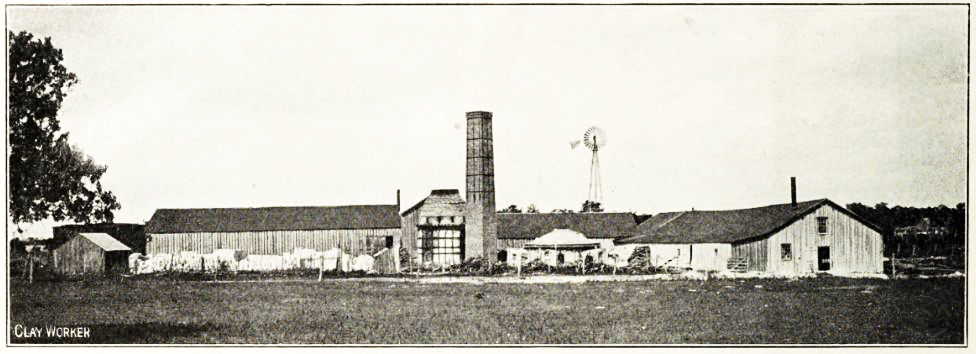
- McDade Pottery in McDade, Texas, 1906
- Industry: Pottery production
- Founded: 1863 in McDade, Texas
- Founder: Robert Lucius (R.L.) Williams
- Defunct: 1942

McDade Pottery was a pottery production company that made utilitarian stoneware in Bastrop County, Texas, beginning in the 19th century.

The pottery operated in the city of McDade, Texas.

== Background ==
The first known pottery in Bastrop County was established by Matthew Duncan, also spelled Dunkin, in 1855 when he bought 10 acres on Alum Creek in the Bastrop Town Tract, now Bastrop State Park, to build a shop. Following Duncan's death (1880), his business, Randolph Manufacturing aka Dunkin Jug Factory, was sold to Milton Stoker. Stoker moved the pottery to Marshy Branch on Yegua Creek, east of McDade, to be near a large source of high quality clay.

Not long after, R.L. Williams left Greensboro, Pennsylvania, where he was born (1859), looking for employment. After a brief stay in Colorado, he found work at Elmendorf Pottery in San Antonio, Texas. On a visit to Austin for the capitol building dedication, he learned of Stoker Pottery. After visiting and demonstrating his skills, Stoker made him a better offer than he had at Elmendorf. Williams started work there in 1888. By 1890, he owned 100% of the business and Stoker moved west.

== McDade Pottery ==
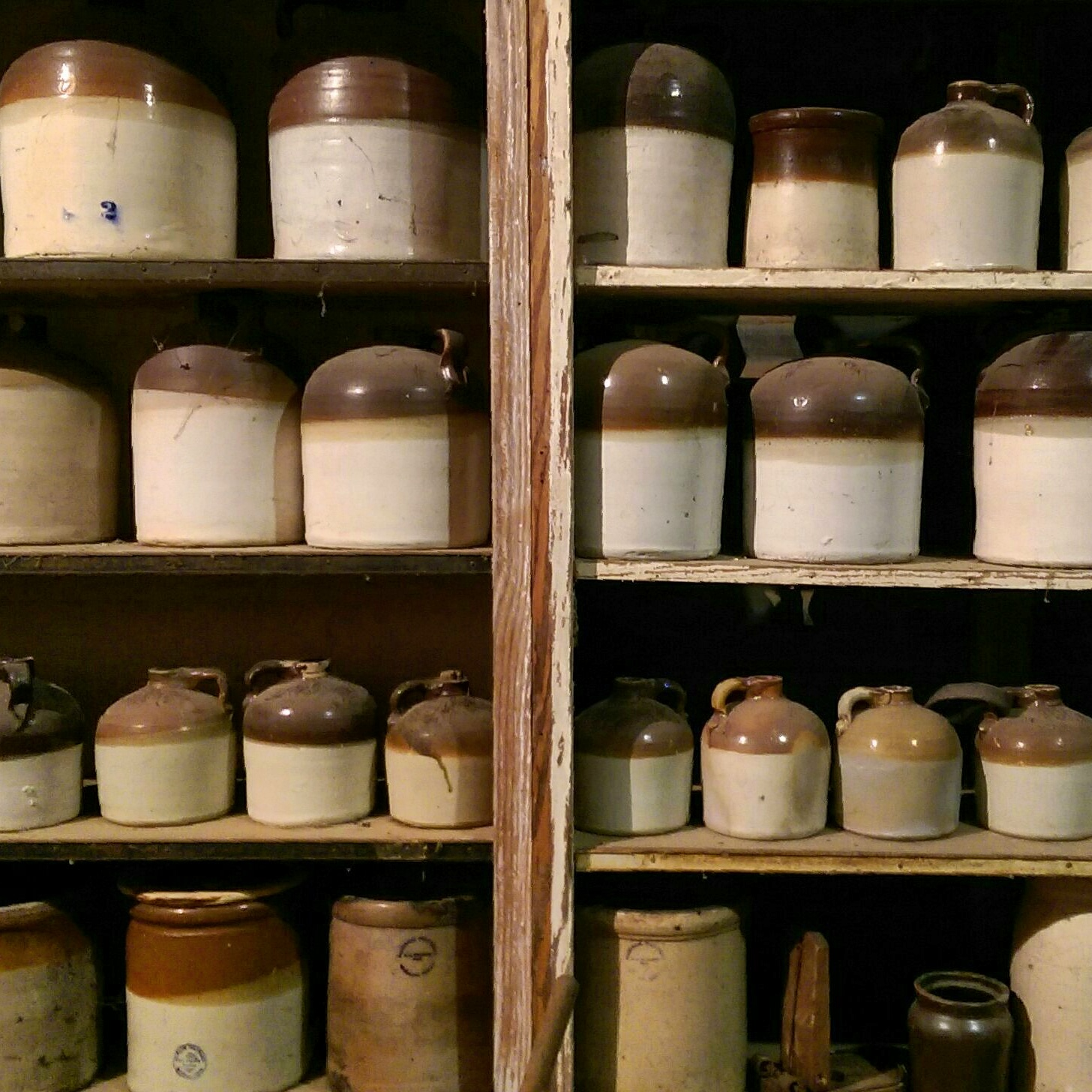
Collection of McDade Pottery crocks and jugs

Williams relocated and expanded the business, renamed McDade Pottery, to a new plant on three acres with two beehive kilns, mule-driven clay-grinding equipment and rail access. The pottery initially produced utilitarian food storage and preparation vessels typical of the era: jugs, churns, crocks, pitchers and bowls. Over the years, ant traps, chicken waterers, ashtrays, novelty items, doorstops and flower pots were added.

At first, the ware was wheel-thrown by individual potters. Williams threw the first piece on January 26, 1893, to celebrate the plant's opening. Initially, Williams also did most of the work: preparing the clay; throwing, glazing and firing pots; and then hawking the vessels at roadside stands, nearby gas stations and even door to door. As the business grew, he started shipping carloads of ware by train to Austin and Houston from the rail spur at the plant, while trucks carried the products into adjoining states and possibly beyond. In 1894, the pottery employed at least 20 people, including family members.

The ceramics were initially salt-glazed. In this method, salt is tossed into the kiln toward the end of the firing cycle, where it vaporizes and settles on the ware, creating a shiny surface with a distinctive "orange peel" texture. Later, Bristol glaze, a feldspathic off-white glaze incorporating zinc oxide, or a combination of Bristol glaze (bottom of ware) and Albany slip, an iron-rich chocolate brown slip-glaze (top of ware), were employed.

In 1909, hard times in McDade forced Williams to engage in bartering to distribute pottery. To facilitate this mode of commerce, he, M. Benson and H.R. Cain established a private firm, McDade Mercantile Co. (The building is now part of the McDade Historical Museum.) The business' goal was to sell merchandise for a span of 50 years. Williams' wife Annis and son Albert Paine managed the store, often trading stoneware for produce, eggs and bacon proffered by the penniless.

== Ceramic press ==
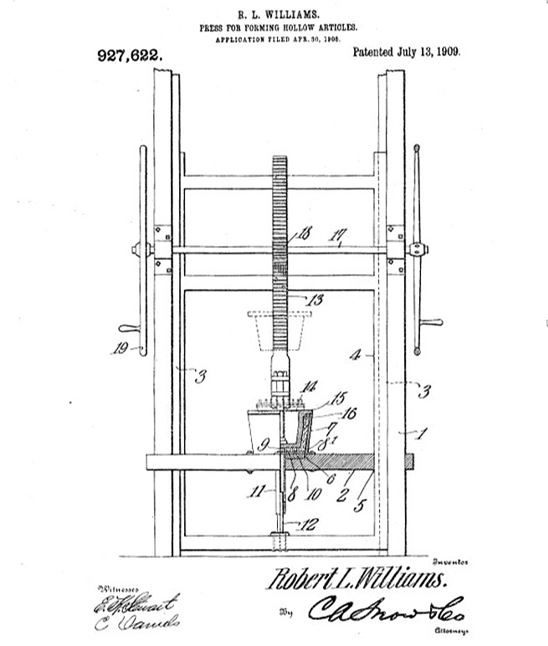
R.L. Williams, U.S. Patent 927,622, Press for forming hollow articles

On July 13, 1909, Williams was granted U.S. Patent 927,622 for a "press to form hollow articles." A seeming predecessor to today's ram press, the apparatus could be fit with variously sized dies to rapidly manufacture flowerpots and other hollow ware.

The invention consisted of a vertical frame with a horizontal table supporting a mold (die). Fed through the frame's crossbars was a rod with attached plunger. In operation, a hand-turned wheel was spun to lower the plunger, pressing a ball of clay into a mold. The plunger stopped short of the mold bottom to form the pot base. A flange at the top of the plunger contacted the mold top to form the upper edge of the ware. When the plunger was raised, the formed clay object could be removed.

The resulting flowerpots, as well as birdbaths, lawn vases and hanging baskets, were shipped by freight car to nurseries and florists throughout Texas, Oklahoma, Arkansas and Louisiana. During the pottery's heyday in the 1920s and 1930s, tens of thousands of molded flowerpots were sold every year.

== The Champion Charcoal Ironing Furnace ==
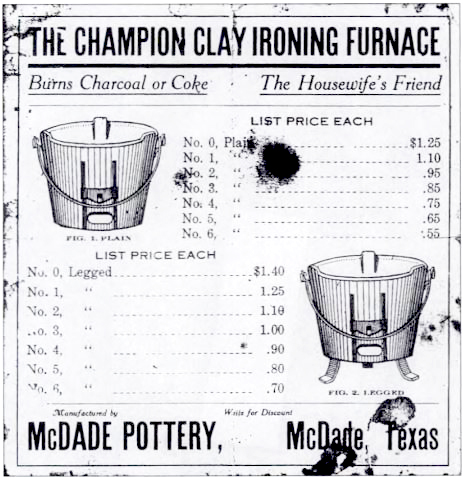
The Champion Clay Ironing Furnace, manufactured by McDade Pottery

The Champion Charcoal Ironing Furnace was an ingenious and popular product manufactured with the patented press. Williams' received a second patent, U.S. 981,731, on June 6, 1911, for a "Furnace-forming die."

Marketed as "The Housewife's Friend," the portable coal- or coke-fired ceramic "stove" was used to heat flat irons, cook food, and to warm the feet of buggy riders and mail carriers on cold days. Since the furnace was portable, it found widespread use during canning season, when it could be moved to the backyard to prepare preserved fruits and vegetables.

The appliance was basically a ceramic bucket, often clad in tin with a looped wire handle, and featured a grate that allowed air flow through a ventilation hole below. It came in seven sizes, with or without legs, and retailed for $0.55 to $1.40, depending on the model.

Customers who bought Champion brand coal received the furnace free of charge. Thousands of furnaces were shipped across Texas and nationwide until the arrival of gas and electric stoves. In 1937 alone, 20,000 were distributed.

== R.L. Williams, community leader ==
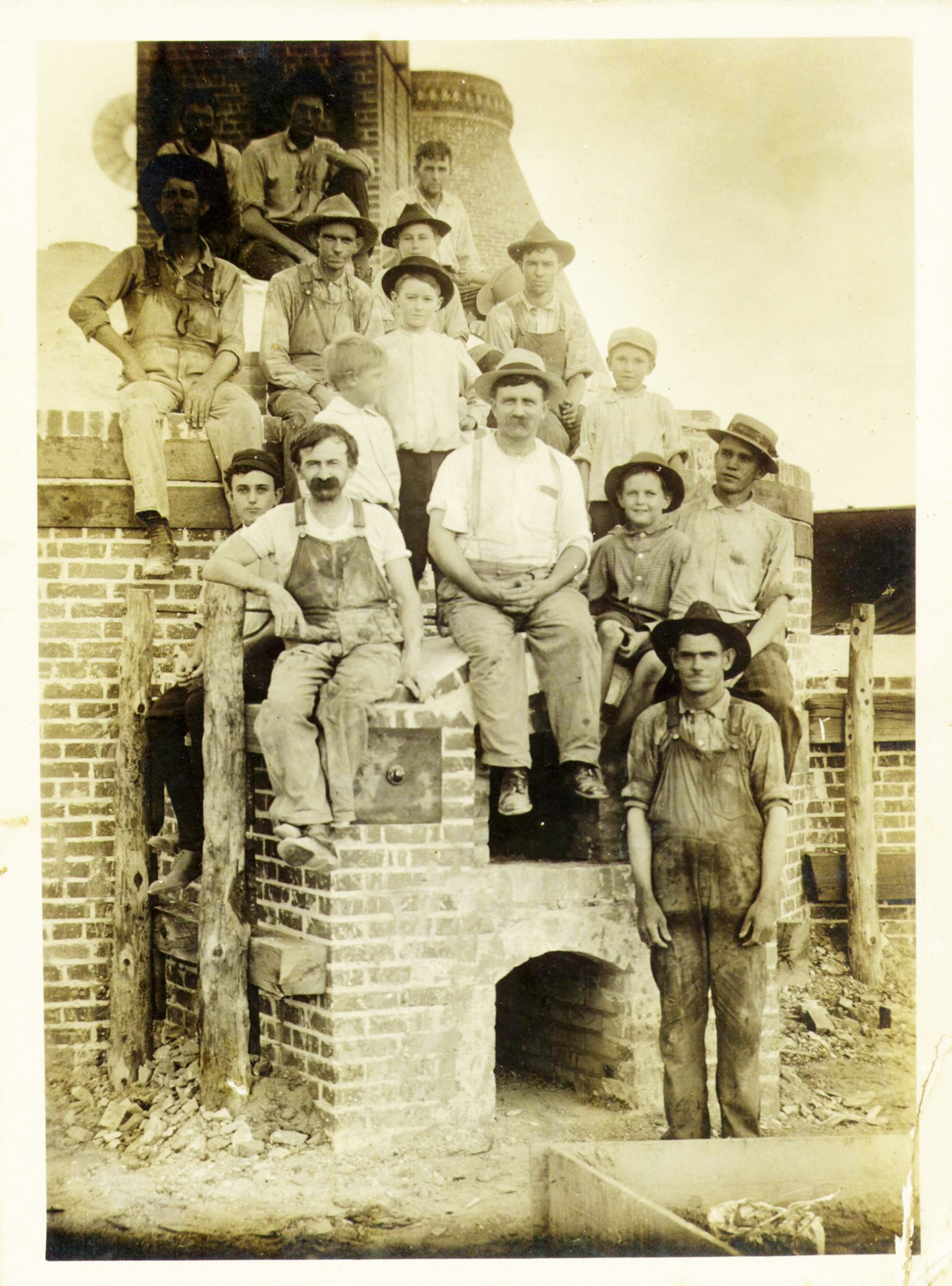
McDade Pottery workers complete the building of kiln number two, R.L. Williams in front

In addition to his success as a businessman and inventor, Williams was a well-respected, productive member of the McDade community. He was unflagging in his efforts to restore the then-lawless town's morality and respectability. In 1869, the soon-to-be community of McDade was chosen as a rail station site. Construction crews poured in and tent cities sprang up, along with makeshift saloons. The enclave, originally dubbed "Tie Town," became a wild and dangerous place. The prosperity brought by completion of the railroad made a boomtown of McDade, while the hilly region nearby served as a perfect hideout for outlaws. Thieves, highwaymen, gang members and cattle rustlers soon created a locality notable for its violence.

In 1894, Williams assisted McDade Baptist Church in purchasing a lot and the building where worshippers gathered and children attended school. He also paid to have the old structure refurbished. A few years later, as leader of the "dries," he was successful in banning the sale of alcohol within McDade precinct. In 1905, he was part of a group of businessmen who convinced the Houston and Texas Central Railway to build an up-to-date depot in town. In 1913, he was name to the board of directors of the new Guaranty State Bank.

== Later operation and legacy ==
R.L. Williams died in 1923. Lacking his father's forceful management style, his son, Albert Paine Williams, continued the business on a reduced scale. In the 1930s, his attempt to add art deco lamp bases to the product lineup was a flop. By then, lightweight cast plastic substitutes were displacing ceramics and reducing demand for the heavier pottery products. The business closed in 1942, when necessary materials and manpower became difficult to obtain with the onset of World War II. The site was dismantled in 1959.

R.L. Williams is buried in the Elgin City Cemetery in Bastrop County.

The McDade Historical Society and Museum was founded in 1963 to preserve the town's significant and colorful past. The museum building, the former Rock Front Saloon, is packed with historical artifacts, including numerous pieces of McDade pottery. Several sizes of butter churns are on display.

Today, McDade pottery is a common collectible. Depending on the item, a piece can sell for hundreds, even thousands, of dollars.
