= Joe Doucet =

American contemporary designer

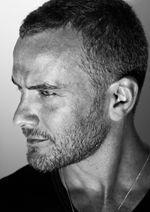
- Joe Doucet
- Born: Houston, Texas, U.S.
- Education: ArtCenter College of Design (1999)
- Occupation: Contemporary designer

Joe Doucet is an American designer. His work has been displayed in the London Design Museum and the Sainte-Etienne International Design Biennale. He was the recipient of a Good Design Award in 2008 and the 2010 World Technology Award for Design. Doucet was also selected the first AvantGuardian for Design by Surface Magazine in 2009. He holds over 30 patents for designs and inventions.

== Early life and education ==
Doucet was born in Houston, Texas. He attended ArtCenter College of Design in Pasadena, California, graduating in 1999 with a degree in Communication design.

== Notable works ==
Among Doucet's notable works are the BlackBox printer for text messages, which reconstructs relationships on cash register receipt paper, and the One Sense Noise-cancelling headphones, inspired by nature's warning signals.

In 2019, Doucet gave a TEDx talk in Bergamo, Italy titled "Questioning the Role of Design".

In late 2021, Doucet introduced the Airiva turbine, a visually appealing modular wind power system designed for urban environments. The modular design allows for scalability and adaptation to various urban scenarios. After two years of development, Airiva estimates each unit can produce 1,100 kilowatt-hours annually, targeting commercial markets initially. Doucet aims for Airiva to integrate into urban landscapes, promoting clean energy adoption.

Doucet, in collaboration with the Times Square Design Lab (TSqDL), also created a crash proof 3D-printed concrete alternative to conventional heavy concrete street furniture like planters, bollards, and barriers.

== Recognition ==
Doucet has won the Smithsonian Cooper Hewitt National Design Award and is also a Dezeen Designer of the Year Nominee.
