= Dianna Wolfson =

American naval officer

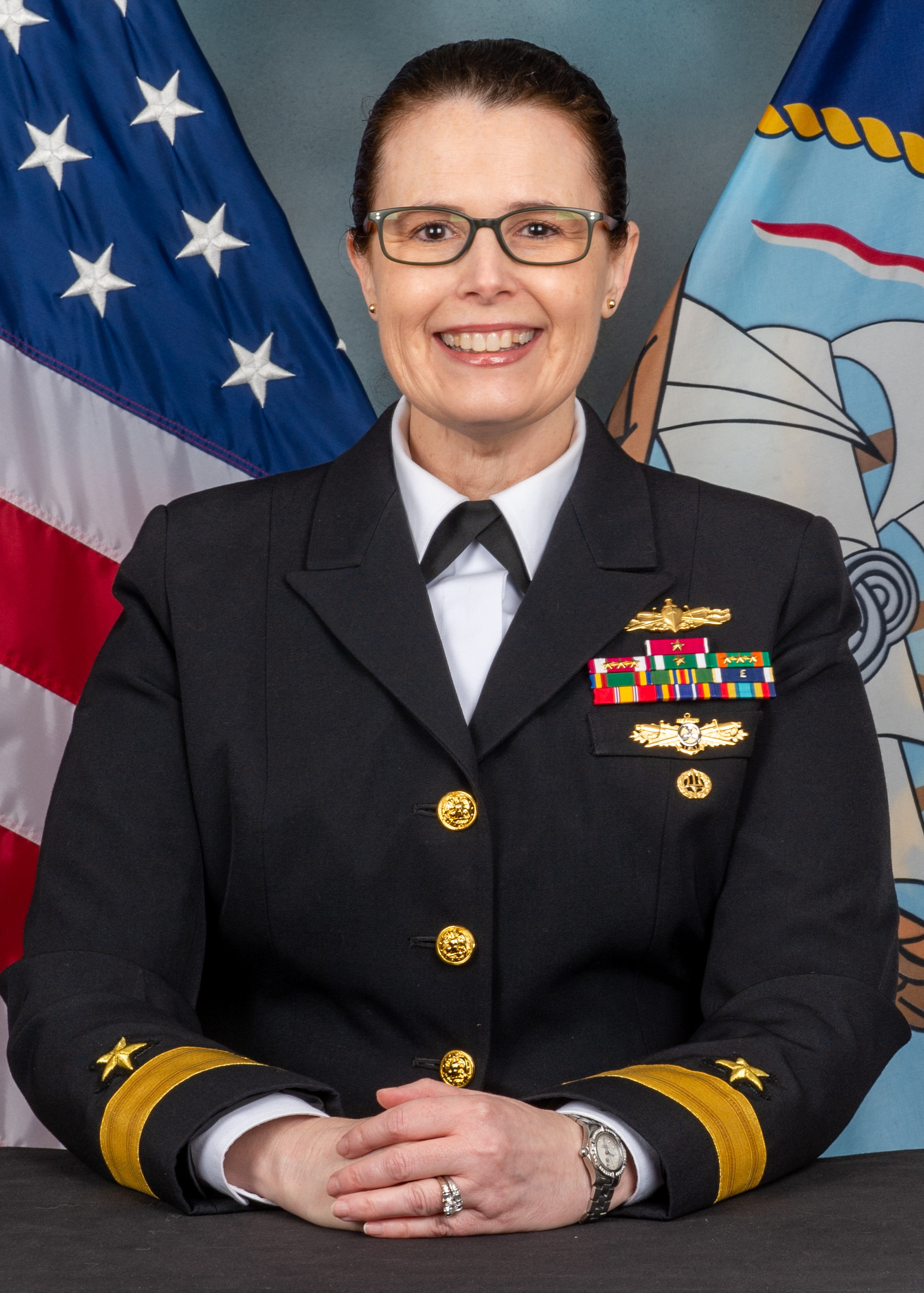
- Education: United States Merchant Marine Academy, Massachusetts Institute of Technology
- Military career
- Branch: United States Navy
- Commands: 110th Commander of Norfolk Naval Shipyard, 50th Commander of Puget Sound Naval Shipyard
- Awards: Legion of Merit, Meritorious Service Medal (four awards), Navy and Marine Corps Commendation Medal (two awards), Navy and Marine Corps Achievement Medal (four awards) and a number of unit awards

Dianna Wolfson is an officer in the United States Navy who is the first woman to lead an American Naval Shipyard, and served from January 2021 to June 2023 as the 110th Commander of the Norfolk Naval Shipyard. From June 2019 to December 2020 she served as the 50th Commander of the Puget Sound Naval Shipyard.

== Naval career ==
Wolfson previously worked in the Reactor Mechanical Division aboard the USS George Washington from 1998 to 2001 before serving as an Assistant Project Superintendent at Portsmouth Naval Shipyard from 2004 to 2007 and the Main Propulsion Assistant on the USS Carl Vinson from 2007 to 2009. Wolfson also served as the Project Superintendent at Norfolk Naval Shipyard for the engineered overhaul of the USS Newport News and was selected in 2017 as Operations Officer at Norfolk Naval Shipyard, where she was responsible for overseeing the overhauls of nuclear powered aircraft carriers, submarines, conventional surface ships, and nuclear moored training ships.

== Education ==
Wolfson graduated from the United States Merchant Marine Academy in 1996 with a Bachelor of Science degree in Marine systems engineering (Magna Cum Laude). She also received a Master of Science degree in Civil and environmental engineering and a Naval Engineer's Degree from the Massachusetts Institute of Technology in 2004.

== Awards and decorations ==
Dianna Wolfson has received the Legion of Merit, the Meritorious Service Medal (four awards), the Navy and Marine Corps Commendation Medal (two awards), the Navy and Marine Corps Achievement Medal (four awards), and a number of unit awards.
