= List of Louisiana parishes by French-speaking population =

French spread in Louisiana. Parishes marked in yellow are those where 4–10% of the 2015 population speak French or Cajun French at home, orange 10–15%, red 15–20%.

The list of Louisiana parishes by French-speaking population was created from the 2000 United States census. The Census Bureau collects data on languages spoken at home by inhabitants of Louisiana five years of age or more. Responses "French" and "Cajun" are included. In 2010, statewide, out of a population 5 years and older of 4,152,122, some 179,750 people reported French as their home language, while 14,365 reported "Cajun". A further 4,465 who reported French Creole, which includes both Louisiana's Kouri-Vini and Haiti's Kreyòl, are not counted below.

The 2015 update comes from American Community Survey data. In 2005 the U.S. Census Bureau retired its census long form, instead using ACS estimates to track language use. For 2015, a total of 107,616 people in Louisiana (5 years old and older) were estimated to speak French, including Cajun French, Patois, and other varieties of French. An additional 7,209 people were estimated to speak French Creole, but are not included in the table below. The 2017–2021 ACS update estimated 57,640 French speakers and 14,020 speakers of "Cajun French and other French languages." As of July 2025, a parish-by-parish breakdown of French speakers over the age of 5 was not available.

== Complete Parish listing ==
The 2000 values were derived from the 2000 U.S. Census. The 2015 estimates are from the 2011–2015 American Community Survey.

| Name of parish | Total population 5 and older 2000 | French-speaking population 5 and older 2000 | Percentage French-speaking 2000 | Total population 5 and older 2015 | French-speaking population 5 and older 2015 | Percentage French-speaking 2015 | Map |
|---|---|---|---|---|---|---|---|
| Acadia (Note: Parishes of Cajun Heartland) | 54,114 | 10,310 | 19.04% | 57,599 | 6,022 | 10.46% | |
| Allen | 23,571 | 1,468 | 6.22% | 23,993 | 936 | 3.90% | |
| Ascension (Note: Other parishes of Acadiana) | 70,093 | 1,944 | 2.76% | 106,272 | 1,201 | 1.13% | |
| Assumption | 21,713 | 3,819 | 17.58% | 21,780 | 2,803 | 12.87% | |
| Avoyelles | 38,468 | 6,789 | 17.64% | 38,590 | 4,024 | 10.43% | |
| Beauregard | 30,559 | 570 | 1.86% | 33,819 | 202 | 0.60% | |
| Bienville | 14,699 | 79 | 0.53% | 13,179 | 32 | 0.24% | |
| Bossier | 90,587 | 474 | 0.51% | 11,4343 | 515 | 0.45% | |
| Caddo | 233,812 | 1,944 | 0.82% | 236,334 | 1,406 | 0.59% | |
| Calcasieu | 169,745 | 10,170 | 5.98% | 182,476 | 5,411 | 2.97% | |
| Caldwell | 9,868 | 79 | 0.80% | 9,532 | 16 | 0.17% | |
| Cameron | 9,279 | 1,075 | 11.57% | 6,365 | 390 | 6.13% | |
| Catahoula | 10,183 | 99 | 0.97% | 9,607 | 14 | 0.15% | |
| Claiborne | 15,794 | 35 | 0.22% | 15,788 | 96 | 0.61% | |
| Concordia | 18,698 | 190 | 1.01% | 19,127 | 67 | 0.35% | |
| De Soto | 23,607 | 230 | 0.97% | 25,255 | 146 | 0.58% | |
| East Baton Rouge | 382,741 | 7,925 | 2.07% | 415,656 | 3,705 | 0.89% | |
| East Carroll | 8,585 | 55 | 0.64% | 7,176 | 8 | 0.11% | |
| East Feliciana | 19,853 | 574 | 2.88% | 18,800 | 89 | 0.47% | |
| Evangeline | 32,454 | 8,345 | 25.71% | 31,387 | 4,925 | 15.69% | |
| Franklin | 19,649 | 79 | 0.40% | 19,101 | 24 | 0.13% | |
| Grant | 17,223 | 230 | 1.32% | 21,031 | 211 | 1.00% | |
| Iberia | 67,374 | 8,089 | 11.99% | 68,599 | 4,944 | 7.21% | |
| Iberville | 31,035 | 1,005 | 3.23% | 31,295 | 739 | 2.36% | |
| Jackson | 14,363 | 148 | 1.03% | 15,157 | 76 | 0.50% | |
| Jefferson | 424,600 | 7,763 | 1.82% | 407,505 | 3,408 | 0.84% | |
| Jefferson Davis | 28,844 | 4,660 | 16.15% | 29,268 | 2,162 | 7.39% | |
| Lafayette | 176,051 | 25,300 | 14.37% | 215,676 | 15,081 | 6.99% | |
| Lafourche | 83,518 | 15,984 | 19.12% | 91,127 | 9,310 | 10.22% | |
| La Salle | 13,281 | 167 | 1.25% | 13,976 | 43 | 0.31% | |
| Lincoln | 39,573 | 510 | 1.28% | 44,573 | 126 | 0.28% | |
| Livingston | 84,694 | 1,344 | 1.58% | 124,592 | 1,086 | 0.87% | |
| Madison | 12,555 | 25 | 0.19% | 10,999 | 18 | 0.16% | |
| Morehouse | 28,735 | 75 | 0.26% | 25,042 | 41 | 0.16% | |
| Natchitoches | 36,082 | 339 | 0.93% | 36,803 | 147 | 0.40% | |
| Orleans | 450,894 | 5,805 | 1.28% | 353,307 | 3,963 | 1.12% | |
| Ouachita | 136,264 | 1,030 | 0.75% | 144,757 | 302 | 0.21% | |
| Plaquemines | 24,581 | 855 | 3.47% | 21,772 | 183 | 0.84% | |
| Pointe Coupée | 21,139 | 1,035 | 4.89% | 21,075 | 377 | 1.79% | |
| Rapides | 116,866 | 2,189 | 1.86% | 123,203 | 1,391 | 1.13% | |
| Red River | 8,854 | 20 | 0.22% | 8,211 | 40 | 0.49% | |
| Richland | 19,319 | 100 | 0.51% | 19,388 | 35 | 0.18% | |
| Sabine | 21,830 | 190 | 0.86% | 22,647 | 110 | 0.49% | |
| St. Bernard | 62,812 | 915 | 1.44% | 39,468 | 150 | 0.38% | |
| St. Charles | 44,152 | 1,189 | 2.69% | 49,355 | 301 | 0.61% | |
| St. Helena | 9,690 | 30 | 0.30% | 10,164 | 132 | 1.30% | |
| St. James | 19,684 | 980 | 4.97% | 20,296 | 456 | 2.25% | |
| St. John the Baptist | 39,220 | 735 | 1.86% | 41,177 | 266 | 0.65% | |
| St. Landry | 80,668 | 13,475 | 16.70% | 77,090 | 5,875 | 7.62% | |
| St. Martin | 44,779 | 12,290 | 27.44% | 49,516 | 6,887 | 13.91% | |
| St. Mary | 49,345 | 2,685 | 5.43% | 49,827 | 1,402 | 2.81% | |
| St. Tammany | 177,092 | 2,160 | 1.21% | 228,469 | 1,696 | 0.74% | |
| Tangipahoa | 93,002 | 1,084 | 1.16% | 116,590 | 554 | 0.48% | |
| Tensas | 6,144 | 35 | 0.56% | 4,591 | 31 | 0.68% | |
| Terrebonne | 96,309 | 10,275 | 10.66% | 104,610 | 4,845 | 4.63% | |
| Union | 21,129 | 95 | 0.44% | 21,199 | 70 | 0.33% | |
| Vermilion | 49,842 | 12,410 | 24.89% | 54,931 | 8,026 | 14.61% | |
| Vernon | 47,048 | 350 | 0.74% | 47,661 | 237 | 0.50% | |
| Washington | 40,738 | 364 | 0.89% | 43,596 | 369 | 0.85% | |
| Webster | 39,110 | 243 | 0.62% | 38,047 | 95 | 0.25% | |
| West Baton Rouge | 20,012 | 675 | 3.36% | 22,947 | 209 | 0.91% | |
| West Carroll | 11,507 | 83 | 0.72% | 10,764 | 24 | 0.22% | |
| West Feliciana | 14,338 | 159 | 1.10% | 14,790 | 142 | 0.96% | |
| Winn | 15,783 | 64 | 0.40% | 14,017 | 24 | 0.17% | |
| Louisiana total | 4,152,122 | 194,115 | 4.66% | 3,426,483 | 107,616 | 2.49% | |

== See also ==
- French language in the Americas
