= Magna Carda =

- Origin: Austin, Texas, United States
- Genres: Hip hop, neo soul, R&B
- Instruments: Vocals, guitar, drums, keyboards, bass, Akai MPC
- Years active: 2011–present
- Members: Megz Kelli; Dougie Do

Magna Carda is an American hip hop outfit from Austin, Texas. The group is notable for performing with live instrumentation, and has been called "Austin's answer to The Roots" by Mashable.

== Career ==
Magna Carda was formed in 2011 at St. Edward's University by keyboardist/producer Dougie Do and rapper Megz Kelli. As the group has released previous projects, in January 2014, Magna Carda released their first major mixtape, titled Van Geaux. The group rose to prominence in the Austin music scene after performing at the inaugural X Games in Austin and after being featured in a BuzzFeed article, entitled "40 Songs Proving That Austin, Texas is the Capital of Dope Jams", along with NPR's "Heavy Rotation."

== Discography ==
- Creature Creative (2012)
- Shoe String Theory (2013)
- Van Geaux (2014)
- Van Geaux Remix (2014)
- Like It Is (2014)
- CirQlation (2016)
- Somewhere Between EP (2017)
- Coffee Table Talk Vol. 1 (2017)
- LADEE EP (2019)
- Coffee Table Talk Vol.2 (2020)
- To The Good People (2021)
- Mercedez Babies (2025)
- inninoutcheamind (2026)
