= Dianna Fuller Morgan =

- Education: University of Florida; Rollins College
- Known for: work as the Senior Vice President of Public Affairs and Human Resources, Walt Disney World

Dianna Fuller Morgan currently serves on the board of directors of Chesapeake Utilities Inc., Marriott Vacations Worldwide Corporation and Hersha Hospitality Trust. She previously served on the boards of CNL Hotels and Resorts, CNL Bankshares and CNL Healthcare Properties. In addition, she previously served as chair of the board of directors of Orlando Health. Morgan also served as past chair of the national board for the Children's Miracle Network and as chair of the board for the University of Florida Board of Trustees. Morgan retired in 2001 from a long career with the Walt Disney World where she served as Senior Vice President of Public Affairs and Human Resources.

== Education ==
- Dianna Morgan attended the University of Florida, and graduated from Rollins College with a degree in Organizational Communication.
