= Dianna Clark =

American sport fisher

Dianna Clark is an American sport fisher. She resides in Bumpus Mills, Tennessee.

== Early life ==
When Clark was a child, her family instilled a love of fishing in her along with an appreciation for nature. Clark grew up in Texas as a teenager, and spent much of her recreational time the summer at "farm ponds", where she would spend her time fishing. After retiring from the United States Army, she moved to Tennessee.

== Fishing career ==
As of 2007, Dianna Clark is the top-ranked professional female bass angler. She is the inaugural Toyota Women's Bassmaster Tour (WBT) Angler of the Year, having won the award in 2006. At the WBT, Clark began the season by placing 32nd in the event at Neely Henry Lake in Alabama. She placed first, seventh, and first in her next three events—on Lewisville Lake in Texas, Lake Norman in North Carolina, and Lake Dardanelle in Texas, respectively. She finished the season with 1,393 points, three more points than Tammy Richardson, the second-place angler.
