= Ryan Brasseaux =

American academic (born 1976)

Ryan André Brasseaux (born 1976) is an American scholar of vernacular American music and an education administrator. He formerly served as the Dean of Davenport College at Yale University since 2011. He is an expert on the history of Cajun music, and a frequent collaborator with the 2-time Grammy Award-winning Lost Bayou Ramblers.

== Early life and education ==
Ryan André Brasseaux was born in 1976; his father is Cajun historian Carl A. Brasseaux.

He did undergraduate work in anthropology at the University of Louisiana at Lafayette and earned an M.A. degree from Louisiana State University. He received a M.A. degree and M. Phil. degree in 2008 and his Ph.D. in 2011 from Yale University. He was awarded a Beinecke Research Fellowship, the Lamar Research Scholar, Kinney/Tesoro Fellowships from the Howard R. Lamar Center for the Study of Frontiers and Borders, and a Prize Teaching Fellowship for excellence in undergraduate instruction and mentorship.

== Work ==
In 2007, Brasseaux helped found Public Humanities at Yale University, a graduate student initiative that evolved into an ongoing lecture series and a Masters of Arts program.

Brasseaux has presented his work across the United States, including invited lectures in New York City, Yale University, to the Fulbright Institute, and as the keynote speaker at Nashville's International Country Music Conference. He has also lectured extensively, accompanied by Lost Bayou Ramblers, on the origins and evolution of Cajun music.

In the wake of Hurricane Katrina in 2005, Brasseaux worked as research associate for the nationally syndicated public radio program American Routes (KRVS 88.7 FM) hosted by Nick Spitzer.

== Publications ==
He is the author of Cajun Breakdown: The Emergence of an American-Made Music (Oxford University Press, 2009), co-editor of Accordions, Fiddles, Two Step & Swing: A Cajun Music Reader (2006), and co-author of Stir the Pot: The History of Cajun Cuisine (2005).

- French North America in the Shadows of Conquest (Routledge, 2020).
- Cajun Breakdown: The Emergence of an American-Made Music (Oxford University Press, 2009)
- Accordions, Fiddles, Two Step and Swing: A Cajun Music Reader (Center for Louisiana Studies, University of Louisiana at Lafayette, 2006). With Kevin S. Fontenot.
- Bienvenu, Marcelle; Brasseaux, Carl A.; Brasseaux, Ryan A. (2005). Stir the Pot: A History of Cajun Cuisine. Hippocrene Books. ISBN 9780781811200.

== Personal life ==
Brasseaux is married to Jessika (née Ducharme), and they have two children.

== See also ==
- List of people related to Cajun music
- List of Cajuns
