= Charles T. Booher =

American engineer

Charles T. Booher (July 30, 1959 – January 14, 2005), was an American engineer.

In November 2003, he was indicted by the United States for threatening to injure and kill employees of a Canadian company, DM Contact Management Ltd., who he believed were responsible for sending him large amounts of spam, and causing pop-up ads every few minutes on his work computer, many touting penis enlargement, and refusing to stop. He was released on $75,000 bond, and faced a possible sentence of 5 years in prison and a $250,000 fine.

On January 14, 2005, he committed suicide by asphyxiation with helium.
