= The Applicators =

American pop punk band

- Origin: Austin, Texas
- Genres: Pop punk
- Years active: 1999–present
- Labels: King Fing'r, Hairball 8 , cornerstone ras, Cellofame records, B-Unique UK
- Website: theapplicators.com

The Applicators are an American pop punk band formed January 1999 in Austin, Texas. The all-female lineup includes lead vocalist Sabrina Worthington, guitarist Erica Holland, bassist Kristina Willhite, guitarist Erica Flores and drummer Katy Corser . The Applicators have toured nationally with Circle Jerks, Buzzcocks, Horrorpops, The Vibrators, One Man Army, Epoxies, Bad Religion and many more. Bad Religion guitarist Greg Hetson produced their debut album after seeing one of their gigs in Texas while on tour. Their music is influenced by classic punk bands such as The Misfits and The Cramps, as well as Motörhead.

== Discography ==
=== Albums ===
- What's Your Excuse (Cornerstone R.A.S.) (2001)
- I Know The Truth (The Applicators) (2005)
- My Weapon (King FING'r) (2006)
- Scandal (2015)
- Running (2021) (Cellofame Records0 (2022)
- MY WEAPON 20th Anniversary (Cellofame Records) (2026)

=== Singles and EPs ===
- 17 Again 7-inch EP (Purocrema) (2002)
- Applicators EP (B-Unique/7176) (2004)

=== Compilation appearances ===
- AMP Records Has A Hard-On For Tromquille.com 3XCD (AMP, 2001) - "P.C. Kids"
- 2002 Sampler: I Have Potential (Cornerstone R.A.S., 2002) - "I Want To Live", "I Don't Bleed"
- KVRX Local Live 7: "Better Than Friends" (KVRX, 2003) - "U Got It All"
- The Greater Southbridge Soundtrack (Tight Spot, 2004) - "Action Anthem"
- Look At All The Love We Found: A Tribute To Sublime (Cornerstone R.A.S., 2005) - "New Realization"
- Vans Off The Wall Vol. VIII (Vans, 2005) - "My Weapon"
- Loud Fast Rules: Volume #5 (Loud Fast Rules, 2006) - "Shove U Out"
- Voices In The Wilderness (DIY and Proud) - "I Don't Bleed"
- "DollFest Out of the Dollhouse Vol.1" - (Cellofame, 2025) -"Dance on your Grave"
