= Carl A. Brasseaux =

American historian and educator

Carl Anthony Brasseaux
- Born: August 19, 1951 (age 75); Opelousas, Louisiana, U.S.
- Other name: Antoine Bourque
- Children: Ryan André Brasseaux

Academic background
- Education: University of Southwestern Louisiana; Paris Diderot University

Academic work
- Discipline: Historian
- Sub-discipline: History of French Colonial North America, francophone Louisiana history
- Institutions: University of Louisiana at Lafayette

Carl Anthony Brasseaux (pseudonym: Antoine Bourque; born August 19, 1951) is an American historian and educator. He specialized in French Colonial North America, particularly of Louisiana and the Cajun people. He helped to pioneer the field of Cajun history, and his published works on this topic represent the first serious, in-depth examination of the history of the ethnic group.

He taught at University of Louisiana at Lafayette, from 1975 until 2010.

== Early life and education ==
Brasseaux was born on August 19, 1951, in Opelousas, the seat of St. Landry Parish, in southern Louisiana. He is Cajun and grew up in the town of Sunset, Louisiana.

He received both his Bachelor of Arts and Master of Arts degrees from the University of Louisiana at Lafayette (then named the University of Southwestern Louisiana). He obtained his doctorate in North American studies at the Paris Diderot University.

== Career ==
Brasseaux served at the University of Louisiana at Lafayette from 1975 until 2010; where his roles at the university included the assistant director of Center for Cultural and Eco-Tourism, from 1975 to 2001, and as director from 2001 to 2010; as the curator of colonial records collection from 1980 to 2010; an adjunct assistant professor from 1987 to 1990; assistant professor from 1990 to 1998; and a professor of history from 1998 to 2010.

At the Center for Louisiana Studies, Brasseaux was involved with Louisiana Digital Folklore Archive. This large collection includes the Center for Acadian and Creole Folklore, which is regarded as the largest compilation of media resources pertaining to these two south Louisiana ethnic groups.

== Awards and honors ==
In 1991, the French government awarded Brasseaux the title of Chevalier in the Ordre des Palmes Académiques, an honor reserved for those whose scholarly pursuits are deemed to contribute significantly to French culture.

Brasseaux received the 2003 Louisiana Writer Award for his enduring contribution to the "literary intellectual heritage of Louisiana." The award was presented to him by then Lieutenant Governor Kathleen Blanco, on November 8, 2003, at a ceremony held at the 2nd annual Louisiana Book Festival in Baton Rouge.

== Bibliography ==
Brasseaux has published more than 30 books, many of which are history-related, including those listed below. He has also written fiction under the pseudonym Antoine Bourque.

- Brasseaux, Carl A. (1987). The Founding of New Acadia: The Beginnings of Acadian Life in Louisiana, 1765–1803. Baton Rouge, Louisiana: Louisiana State University (LSU) Press. ISBN 9780807141632.
- Bourque, Antoine (1988). Trois Saisons: contes, nouvelles et fables de Louisiane. L. Courteau. ISBN 9780940984394.
- Brasseaux, Carl A. (1991). "Scattered to the Wind": Dispersal and Wanderings of the Acadians, 1755–1809. Lafayette, Louisiana: University of Southwestern Louisiana. ISBN 9780940984707.
- Brasseaux, Carl A. (1992). Acadian to Cajun: Transformation of a People, 1803–1877. Jackson, Miss.: University Press of Mississippi. ISBN 978-0878055838.
- Brasseaux, Carl A.; Fontenot, Keith; Oubre, Claude F. (1994). Creoles of Color in the Bayou Country. Clifton Carmen (contribution). Jackson, Miss.: University Press of Mississippi. ISBN 9780878057146.
- Brasseaux, Carl A. (2005). French, Cajun, Creole, Houma: A Primer on Francophone Louisiana. Baton Rouge, Louisiana: Louisiana State University (LSU) Press. ISBN 9780807130360.
- Bienvenu, Marcelle; Brasseaux, Carl A.; Brasseaux, Ryan A. (2005). Stir the Pot: A History of Cajun Cuisine. Hippocrene Books. ISBN 9780781811200.

== See also ==
- Center for Louisiana Studies
