= Saffron Herndon =

Comedy career
- Years active: 2013–present
- Medium: Stand-up
- Genres: Observational comedy, black comedy, sarcasm
- Subjects: Everyday life, adolescence, generation gap

Saffron Herndon is an American comedian who rose to fame in September 2015 after images embedded with her stand-up material went viral on Reddit when she was ten years old.

== Reception ==
The Huffington Post described her as having "a better command of the stage and material than humans three times her age".

== Media ==
On October 2, 2015, Saffron made her television debut performing on The Today Show. In September, 2016 A&E ordered a 10-episode documentary series about Saffron entitled Little Funny. All primary filming was completed in the summer of 2017, but A&E subsequently canceled the program before it aired.

Saffron was on an episode of Podcast But Outside
