= Dianna Booher =

American author and communication expert

- Born: Hillsboro, Texas
- Education: Master of Arts, English
- Alma mater: University of Houston
- Occupations: Author; Consultant; Keynote speaker
- Website: booherresearch.com

Dianna Booher is an American author and communication expert. She is also the chief executive of Booher Research Institute, a Colleyville, Texas-based company that offers communication consulting, executive coaching (public speaking, executive presence, enterprise-wide communication messaging), and publishing strategies for Fortune 500 organizations and nonprofit organizations.

She is also the founder of Booher Consultants, a communication training firm, that has worked for Fortune 500 organizations and governmental agencies since 1980. Booher Consultants was acquired by Communispond on August 1, 2017.

== Early life and education ==
Dianna Daniels Booher was born in Hillsboro, Texas, as the daughter of a postal supervisor Alton B. and Opal Daniels. She graduated cum laude from North Texas State University in 1970 with a Bachelor of Arts and earned a Master of Arts degree in English literature from University of Houston in 1979. In 1967 she married Daniel T. Booher, a minister of music. They had two children: Jeffrey Thomas and Lisa Christine.

== Publications ==
Booher has written 47 books on business and personal development topics, all published by major U.S. publishers and their various imprints: Simon and Schuster, Penguin Random House, McGraw-Hill, and HarperCollins. Reviewing Your Signature Work, Publishers Weekly criticized its use of a "hackneyed analogy" between life and basketball, but said it offers "good advice". Fort Worth Star-Telegram called E-Writing "user-friendly" in a favorable review.

Her 2015 book, What More Can I Say? Why Communication Fails and What to Do About It, is discussed in articles in Forbes, FastCompany.com, TLNT.com, and Huffington Post.

Her 2017 book Communicate Like a Leader: Connecting Strategically to Coach, Inspire, and Get Things Done was mentioned favorably in INC, Entrepreneur.com, and Forbes.

== Selected bibliography ==
- Communicate Like a Leader: Connecting Strategically to Coach, Inspire, and Get Things Done (Berrett-Koehler)
- What MORE Can I Say? Why Communication Fails and What to Do About It (Penguin Random House/Perigee)
- Communicate With Confidence: How to Say It Right the First Time and Every Time (Revised and Expanded Edition) (McGraw-Hill)
- Creating Personal Presence: How to Look, Talk, Think, and Act Like a Leader (Berrett-Koehler)
- The Voice of Authority: 10 Communication Strategies Every Leader Needs to Know (McGraw-Hill)
- Booher’s Rules of Business Grammar: 101 Fast and Easy Ways to Correct the Most Common Errors (McGraw-Hill)
- Your Signature Work: Creating Excellence and Influencing Others at Work (Tyndale)
- Speak With Confidence: Powerful Presentations That Inform, Inspire, and Persuade (McGraw-Hill)
- E-Writing: 21st Century Tools for Effective Communication (Simon and Schuster/Pocket Books)
