= Floyd Sonnier =

Floyd Sonnier (1933 – April 6, 2002), was an American artist and illustrator. He was a lifelong resident of Louisiana's Acadiana region. An internationally acclaimed pen-and-ink artist, he specialized in drawings depicting Cajun culture, lifestyle and family, particularly scenes from the first half of the 20th century. He was nicknamed "Beau Cajun".

== Early life and education ==
Floyd Sonnier was born in 1933, the oldest of six children; to David and Virgie Thibodeaux Sonnier in a small share-cropper's house in an area called "La Pointe Noire", southwest of Church Point in Acadia Parish.

Floyd was educated at Our Lady of the Sacred Heart Catholic School and Church Point High. In 1961, Sonnier graduated in commercial art from the University of Louisiana at Lafayette (then called the University of Southwestern Louisiana). In the mid-fifties he served two years with the United States Army, of which one year was spent in Europe.

== Career ==
In November 1975, Floyd Sonnier introduced his pen-and-ink drawings to the public for the first time. This exhibit in Lafayette was so well accepted that it launched his career as a fine artist into national and international fame enjoyed by him today. In 1978 and with the full support of his wife, Verlie, and their four children, Floyd quit his job as manager of the weekly Diocesan Catholic newspaper to become a full-time pen-and-ink artist.

In 1980, he opened Floyd Sonnier's Beau Cajun Art Gallery and Studio in Scott, Louisiana. In 1992, Floyd was awarded the prestigious Scott Business Association "Unique Business Service of the Year" award.

In a career spanning twenty-seven years Floyd Sonnier produced over four hundred major pen-and-ink drawings, mostly depicting Cajun culture, lifestyle and family. Some one-hundred-seventy of these drawings were produced into limited-edition fine art prints and posters all signed and numbered by Floyd. To date a little over one hundred of these editions are sold out. He produced and published the first, in 1978, official poster for the popular Festivals Acadiens of Lafayette and has designed and produced a poster and t-shirts for this festival until 2001. He had designed and produced official posters and t-shirts for the Cajun French Music Association Festivals for the last seven years preceding his death in 2002. In addition to this he has designed and produced official posters for numerous festivals and celebrations.

Floyd Sonnier has had exhibitions throughout Louisiana, in Texas, Oklahoma, Alabama, Nebraska, Vermont and California. He has had four major exhibits in France and numerous trips to French Canada.

== Publications ==
He published I Remember Well / Je Me Souvien Biens, a hard cover book collection of 38 bi-lingual (French and English) stories written by Sonnier depicting his life as a child, growing up in a French-speaking Cajun family and dreaming of becoming an artist. A second book, From Small Bits of Charcoal: The Life & Works of a Cajun Artist was nearly completed by Sonnier and later published by his wife after his death.

He has illustrated eight cookbooks.

One of his projects included a commission to do an illustration for a historical book that was published by LSU Press on the murder by and subsequent public hanging of two young Frenchmen accused of the crime in the town of Scott.

For twenty-five years, Floyd produced his very popular bi-lingual Cajun calendars. Over one-quarter million of this fourteen-month calendar were distributed all over the United States, Canada, France, England and many other parts of the world.
