= McDade, Texas =

Census-designated place in Bastrop County, Texas, United States

- Census-designated place
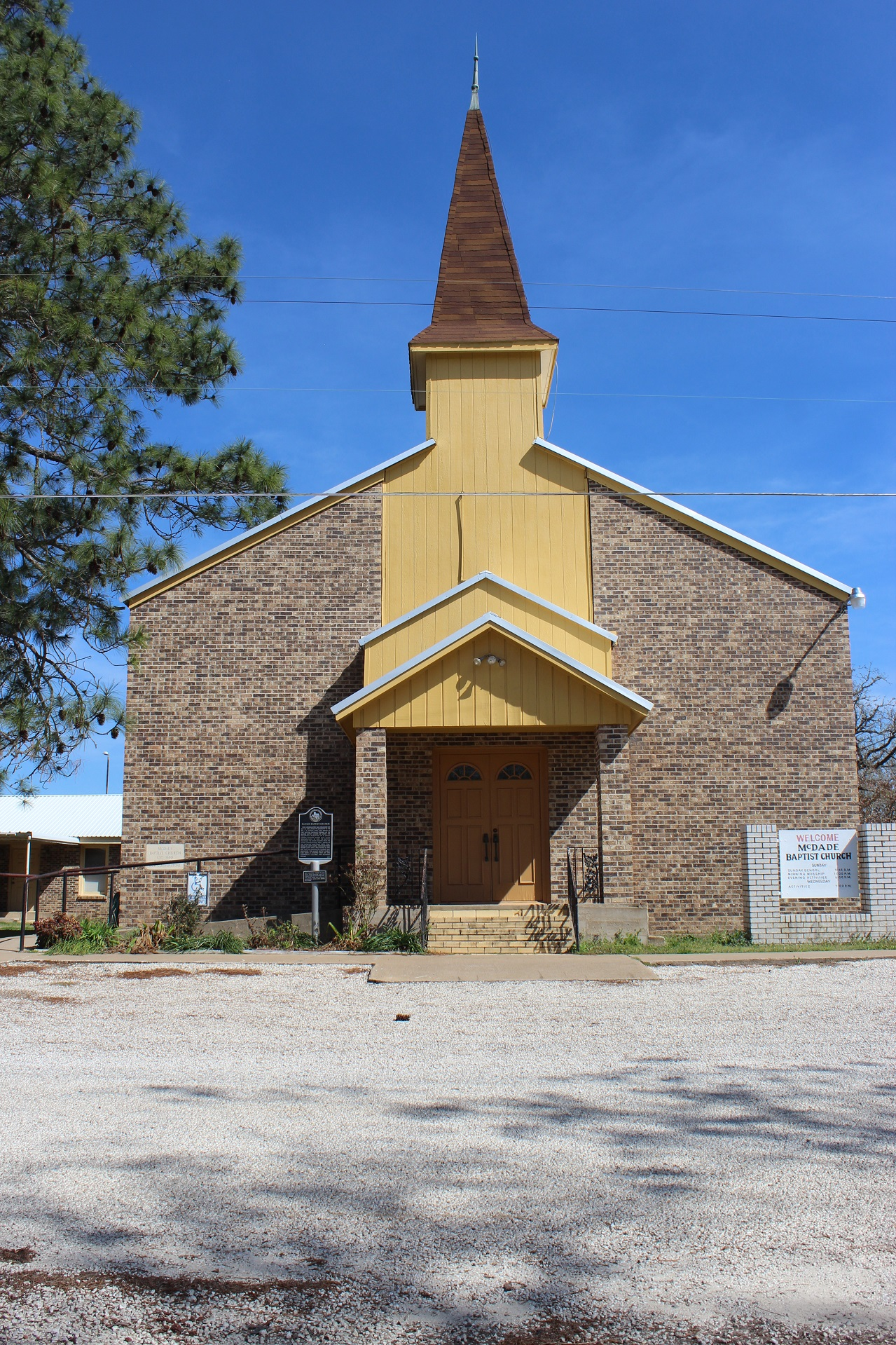
- McDade Baptist Church, February 2015

- Location within the state of Texas Location within the United States
- Coordinates: 30°16′58″N 97°15′05″W
- Country: United States
- State: Texas
- County: Bastrop

Area
  - Total: 4.0 sq mi (10 km^{2})
  - Land: 4.0 sq mi (10 km^{2})
  - Water: 0.0 sq mi (0 km^{2})
- Elevation: 515 ft (157 m)

Population (2020)
  - Total: 720
  - Density: 180/sq mi (69/km^{2})
- Time zone: UTC-6 (Central (CST))
  - Summer (DST): UTC-5 (CDT)
- ZIP code: 78650
- FIPS code: 48-45564
- GNIS feature ID: 2586957

McDade is a census-designated place (CDP) in northern Bastrop County, Texas, United States, located along U.S. Route 290. As of the 2020 census, it had a population of 720. It is 9 miles (14 km) east of Elgin and 34 miles (55 km) east of Austin. It is 21 miles (34 km) west of Giddings.

== History ==
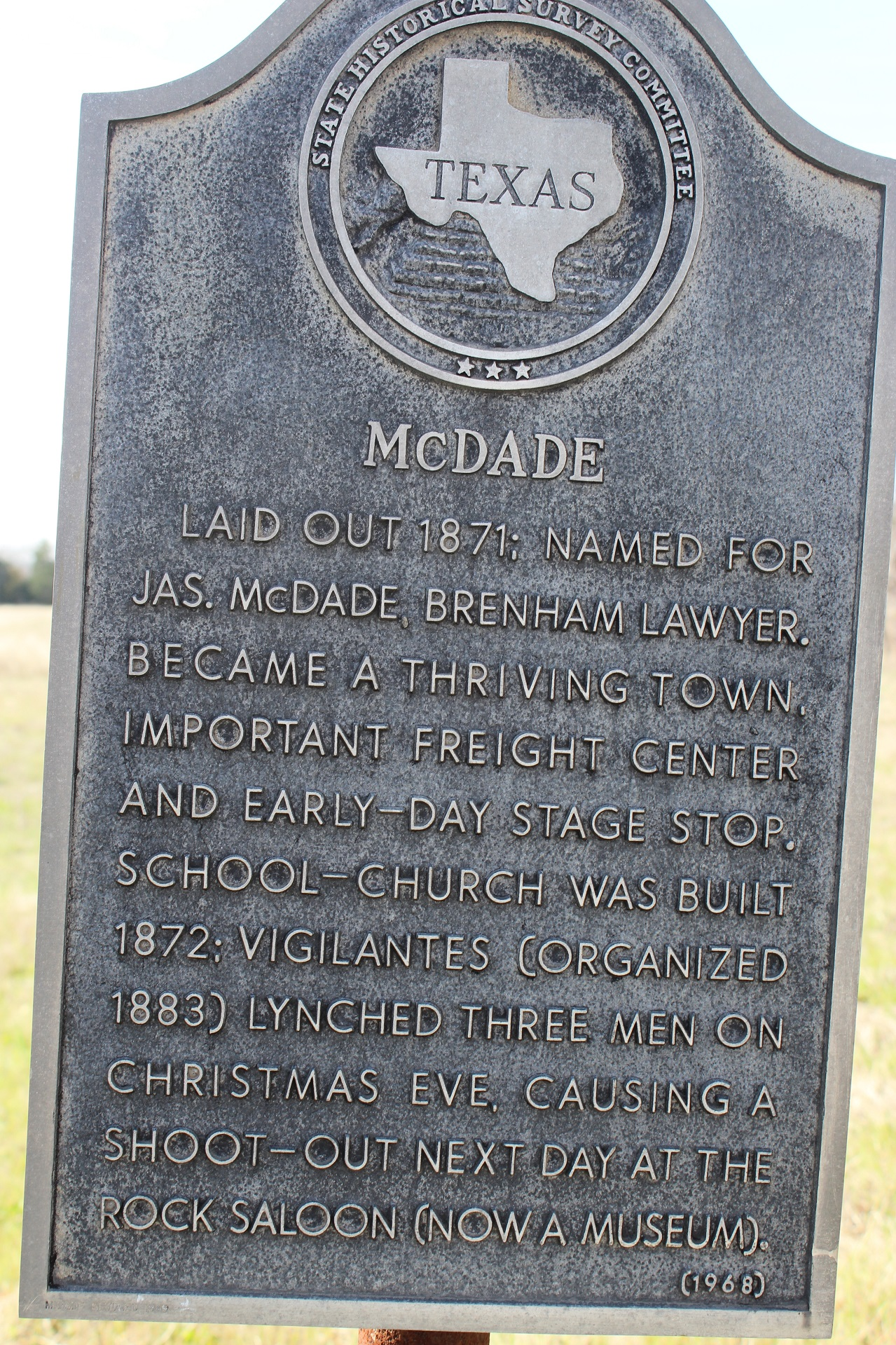
Mcdade historical marker, February 2015

This was a new CDP for the 2010 census.

The community is named for James W. McDade, a major stockholder in the Houston and Texas Central Railroad in 1869.

The McDade Independent School District serves area students.

McDade was, for several years, the childhood home of 1950s television and recording star Gale Storm, as her mother owned a millinery shop in McDade.

McDade Pottery, which operated from 1863 to 1942, is the most successful business ever to exist in the town.

== Geography ==
According to the United States Census Bureau, the CDP has a total area of 4.0 square miles (10 km^{2}), all land.

== Demographics ==
Historical population
Census	Pop.	Note	%±
2010	685		—
2020	720		5.1%
U.S. Decennial Census; 1850–1900 1910; 1920 1930 1940; 1950 1960 1970; 1980 1990 2000; 2010 2020

McDade first appeared as a census designated place in the 2010 U.S. census.

McDade CDP, Texas – Racial and ethnic composition Note: the US Census treats Hispanic/Latino as an ethnic category. This table excludes Latinos from the racial categories and assigns them to a separate category. Hispanics/Latinos may be of any race.
Race / Ethnicity (NH = Non-Hispanic)	Pop 2010	Pop 2020	% 2010	% 2020
White alone (NH)	472	394	68.91%	54.72%
Black or African American alone (NH)	6	4	0.88%	0.56%
Native American or Alaska Native alone (NH)	6	2	0.88%	0.28%
Asian alone (NH)	4	0	0.58%	0.00%
Pacific Islander alone (NH)	0	0	0.00%	0.00%
Other race alone (NH)	0	2	0.00%	0.28%
Mixed race or Multiracial (NH)	3	28	0.44%	3.89%
Hispanic or Latino (any race)	194	290	28.32%	40.28%
Total	685	720	100.00%	100.00%

As of the 2020 United States census, there were 720 people, 368 households, and 268 families residing in the CDP.

== See also ==
- List of census-designated places in Texas
