= Nicolas Chauvin de La Frénière =

Nicolas Chauvin de La Frénière, the younger, (died 26 October 1769) was a son of Nicolas Chauvin, Sieur de La Frenière, the elder, who was born 1675 in Montréal, and died in 1748 in New Orleans, Orleans Parish, Louisiana.

The younger La Frénière was an Attorney General of French Louisiana. He was one of the ringleaders of the Louisiana Rebellion of 1768, the others being Joseph Milhet, Jean-Baptiste Noyan, Pierre Caresse and Pierre Marquis. The rebellion succeeded in driving Antonio de Ulloa, the Spanish Governor of Louisiana out of New Orleans. However the ringleaders, including de La Frénière, were later arrested and subsequently executed on 26 October 1769 by firing squad.

According to the A History of Louisiana (1909):

It was found that there was no hangman in the colony, so the condemned prisoners were ordered to be shot. When the day of execution came, hundreds of people left the city. Those who could not leave went into their houses, closed the doors and windows and waited in an agony of sickening dread to hear the fatal shots. Only the tramping of soldiers broke the deathlike stillness which brooded over the crushed and helpless city. At three o’clock on a perfect October afternoon in 1769, the condemned men were led to the Spanish barracks. Lafreniere, it is said, gave the order to fire. A volley of muskets broke out on the still air, and five patriots went to their death, — the first Louisianians to give their blood for the cause of freedom.

Lafreniere Park is named in his memory.
