= Agus (footballer) =

Spanish footballer (born 1985)

Personal information
- Full name: Agustín García Íñiguez
- Date of birth: 3 May 1985 (age 41)
- Place of birth: Bonete, Spain
- Height: 1.88 m (6 ft 2 in)
- Position: Centre-back

Youth career
- Albacete

Senior career*
Years	Team	Apps	(Gls)
2004–2005	Albacete B	32	(0)
2005	Albacete	7	(0)
2005–2009	Real Madrid B	91	(3)
2007–2008	→ Celta (loan)	29	(1)
2009–2011	Córdoba	56	(3)
2011–2012	Alcorcón	40	(2)
2012–2013	Orduspor	24	(0)
2013–2015	Mallorca	45	(2)
2015–2016	Albacete	9	(0)
2016–2017	Houston Dynamo	8	(0)
2017	→ RGV Toros (loan)	1	(0)
2017–2018	Esbjerg	35	(0)
2019	Nea Salamina	7	(0)
2019–2020	ATK	14	(0)
Total		398	(11)

International career
2005	Spain U20	1	(0)
- * Club domestic league appearances and goals

Agustín García Íñiguez (born 3 May 1985), commonly known as Agus, is a Spanish former professional footballer who played as a central defender.

== Club career ==
Agus was born in Bonete, Province of Albacete. After appearing in seven La Liga games for eventually relegated Albacete Balompié in the 2004–05 season, he was bought by Real Madrid for €600,000 and immediately sent to its B team.

As Castilla were relegated from the Segunda División in 2006–07, Agus, alongside coach Míchel's son Adrián, were loaned to another side in that level, RC Celta de Vigo, with different individual fates. The former returned to Real's reserves for the 2008–09 campaign.

In the subsequent summer, Agus signed a three-year contract with Córdoba CF, with his previous club holding 50% of his rights. In the following years, safe for one season in the Turkish Süper Lig with Orduspor, he continued competing in his country's second tier, representing AD Alcorcón, RCD Mallorca and Albacete.

On 27 January 2016, Agus signed with Houston Dynamo of Major League Soccer. Released on 9 June 2017, the 32-year-old moved to the Danish 1st Division one month later and joined Esbjerg fB on a two-year deal.

Agus signed for ATK of the Indian Super League on 26 July 2019, from Nea Salamina Famagusta FC. In July 2020, having won the championship for his only career honour, he retired aged 35.

== International career ==
Agus represented Spain at the 2005 FIFA World Youth Championship. His sole appearance for the quarter-finalists was the 3–0 win over Honduras in the group stage.

== Career statistics ==
As of match played on 26 November 2017

Club	Season	League			Cup		Other		Total	
Club	Season	Division	Apps	Goals	Apps	Goals	Apps	Goals	Apps	Goals
Albacete	2004–05	La Liga	7	0	0	0	—		7	0
Real Madrid B	2005–06	Segunda División	18	0	—		—		18	0
Real Madrid B	2006–07	Segunda División	39	0	—		—		39	0
Real Madrid B	2007–08	Segunda División B	1	0	—		—		1	0
Real Madrid B	2008–09	Segunda División B	33	3	—		—		33	3
Real Madrid B	Total		91	3	—		—		91	3
Celta (loan)	2007–08	Segunda División	29	1	1	0	—		30	1
Córdoba	2009–10	Segunda División	38	2	1	0	—		39	2
Córdoba	2010–11	Segunda División	18	1	6	0	—		24	1
Córdoba	Total		56	3	7	0	—		63	3
Alcorcón	2011–12	Segunda División	40	2	2	0	4 (Note: Appearances in La Liga play-offs)	0	46	2
Orduspor	2012–13	Süper Lig	24	0	0	0	—		24	0
Mallorca	2013–14	Segunda División	24	1	1	0	—		25	1
Mallorca	2014–15	Segunda División	21	1	1	0	—		22	1
Mallorca	2015–16	Segunda División	0	0	0	0	—		0	0
Mallorca	Total		55	2	2	0	—		57	2
Albacete	2015–16	Segunda División	9	0	1	0	—		10	0
Houston Dynamo	2016	Major League Soccer	8	0	3	0	—		11	0
RGV Toros (loan)	2017	United Soccer League	1	0	0	0	—		1	0
Esbjerg	2017–18	Danish 1st Division	13	0	0	0	—		13	0
Career total			323	11	16	0	4	0	343	11

== Honours ==
ATK

- Indian Super League: 2019–20
