= Louisiana Rebellion of 1768 =

Failed revolt against incoming Spanish rule

- Part of the aftermath of the Seven Years' War
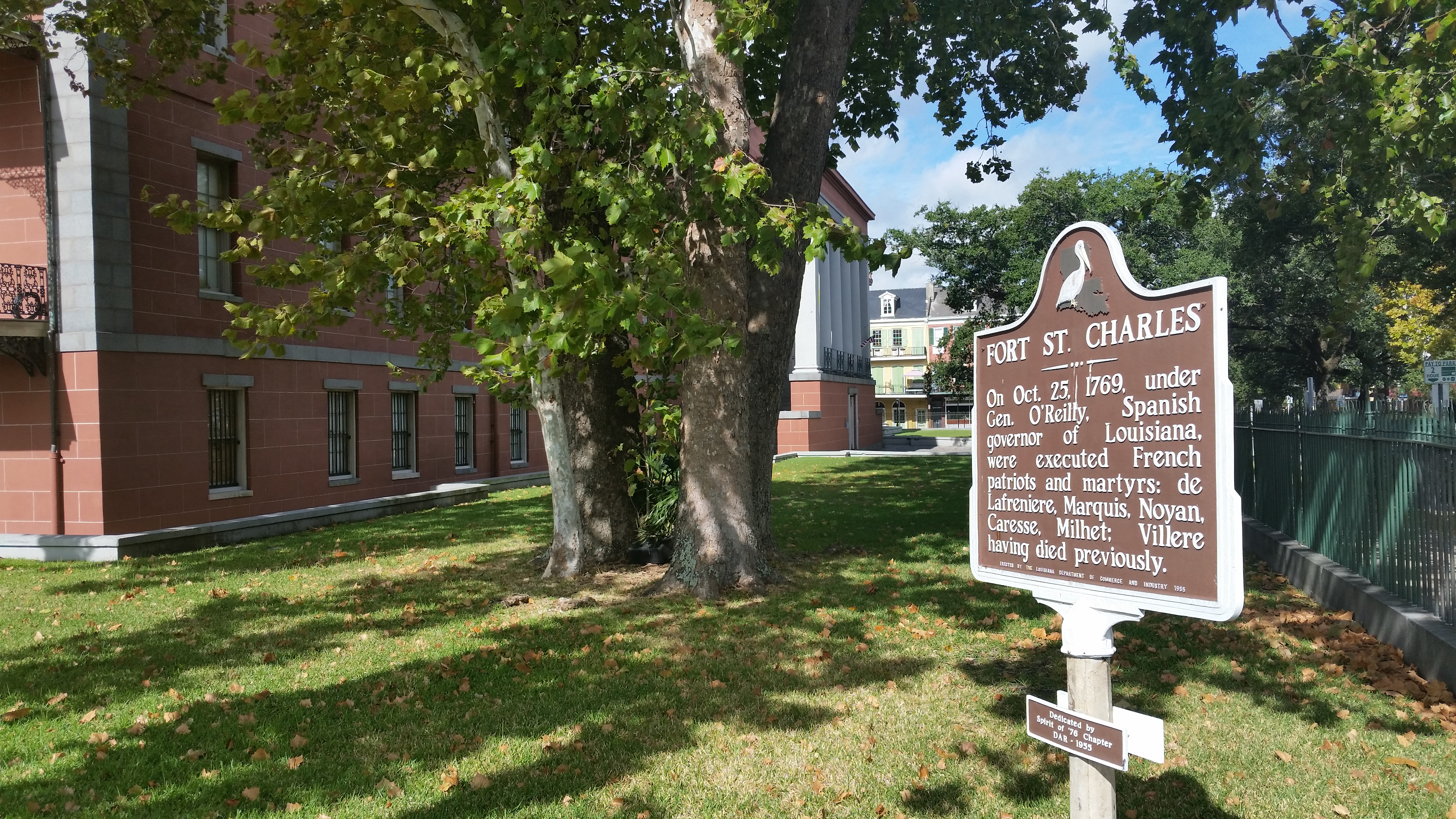
- State historical marker in front of the New Orleans Mint
Date	1768–1769
Location	Louisiana
Result	Spanish victory

Belligerents
Spain	Creole settlers

Commanders and leaders
(Spanish Empire) Antonio de Ulloa (Spanish Empire) Alejandro O'Reilly	Nicolas de La Frénière (executed); Joseph Milhet (executed)

Strength
2,100; 23 warships	Unknown

Casualties and losses
Unknown	Unknown

The Rebellion of 1768, also known as the Revolt of 1768 or the Creole Revolt, was an unsuccessful attempt by the Louisiana French Creole elite of New Orleans, along with nearby German settlers, to reverse the transfer of the French Louisiana to Spain, as had been stipulated in the 1762 Treaty of Fontainebleau.

The rebellion forced the Spanish Governor, Antonio de Ulloa, to leave New Orleans and return to Spain, but his replacement, General Alejandro O'Reilly, was able to crush the rebellion, execute five of its ringleaders, and firmly establish Spanish control over the territory.

== Background ==
In the Treaty of Paris at the conclusion of the global Seven Years' War, known in America as the French and Indian Wars, France lost all of its territories on the North America continent including Canada, Illinois Country and Louisiana. It got to keep its French West Indies islands in the Caribbean and also the islands of Saint Pierre and Miquelon. Great Britain acquired Canada and all the land on the east bank of the Mississippi River and its tributaries. As compensation from losses elsewhere, France handed over control of New Orleans and all the land on the west bank of the Mississippi River and its tributaries to their Spanish allies. Implementation of the turnover was slow in North America with the French continuing to expand its villages including founding St. Louis. In April 1764 the first Spanish governor, Jean-Jacques Blaise d'Abbadie, a French official who was administering Louisiana for the Spanish, took office and heard complaints from among the natives. D'Abbadie died from illness on February 4, 1765. The senior military officer in the colony Captain Charles Philippe Aubry, a French officer, assumed control and continued to administer the colony for Spain. After a mass meeting in January 1765, Jean Milhet, a rich and influential New Orleans merchant, was sent to France to appeal directly to Louis XV to rescind the decision to transfer Louisiana to the Spanish crown, but the King would not grant him an audience.

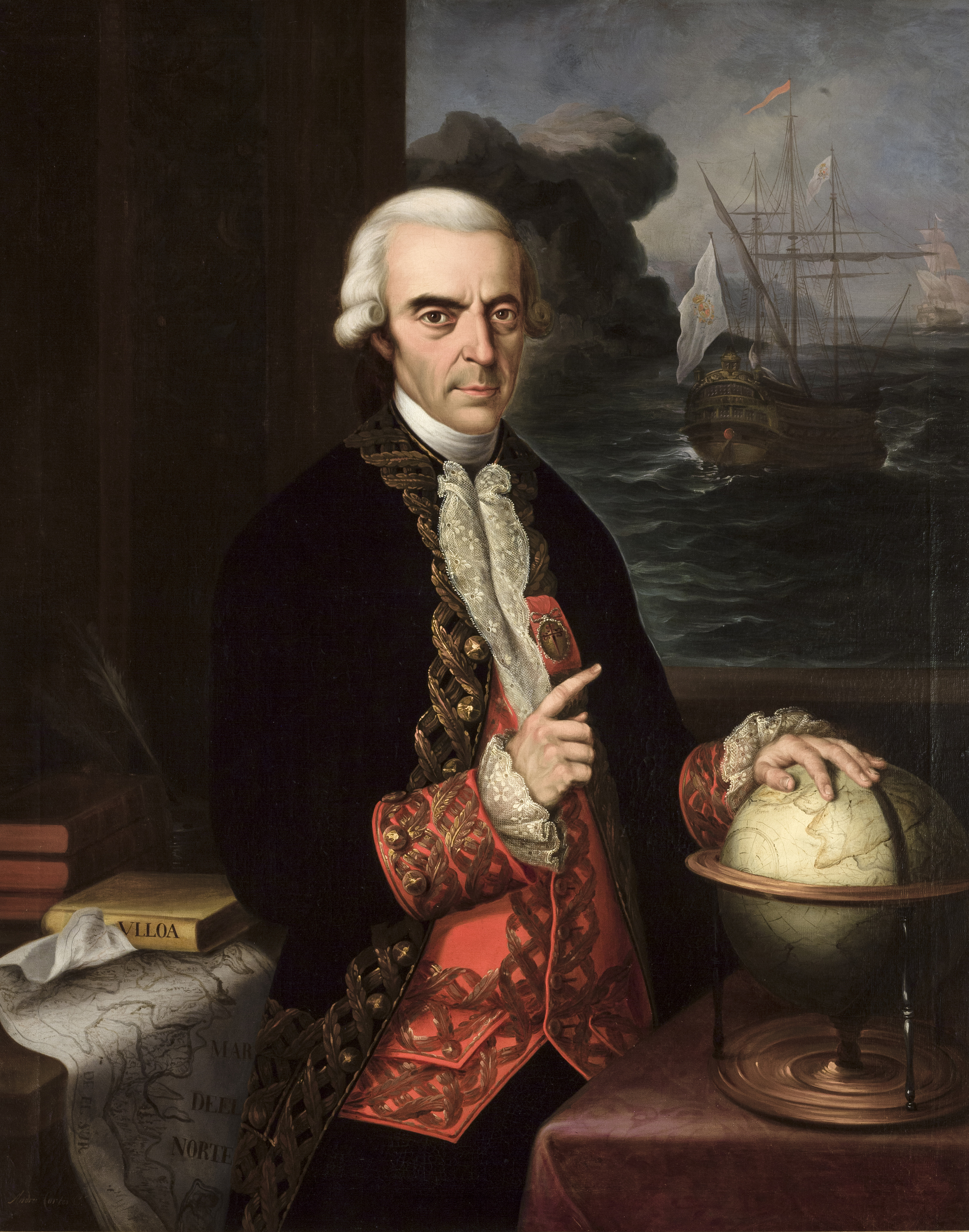
Antonio de Ulloa, whose governorship of Louisiana preceded the rebellion

On March 5, 1766, Antonio de Ulloa, the new Spanish governor, arrived, but brought with him only 90 soldiers and a small group of bureaucrats. Spain had expected French soldiers to join the Spanish army with the transfer of control of Louisiana, but few did. Having insufficient military support if there were to be an insurrection, he did not present his credentials and did not formally accept the handing over of the territory, not even raising the Spanish flag over the Place d'Armes. Instead, he decided to run the colony through Aubrey, the interim French governor. Ulloa finally took formal possession of the colony in late January 1767, in an impromptu ceremony held at La Balize, Louisiana; however, he changed his mind the next day when it came time to sign the act of transfer, saying he would wait to do so when he had sufficient military support on hand. The elite of New Orleans were displeased at Ulloa's actions, especially as the transfer ceremony did not take place in New Orleans, the colony's capital, with what they saw as the necessary pomp. They were also confused that the French fleur-de-lis flag still flew over the city while the Spanish flag flew over La Balize.

Ulloa's superiors in Havana virtually ignored his many requests, including to replace the colony's French currency with pesos and the dispatch of more soldiers. Although fluent in French, Ulloa disliked New Orleans society, which he considered to be full of boors who drank too much and were profligate with their money. A Renaissance man, scholar, and naturalist who also studied cartography, astronomy, and engineering, Ullola preferred to spend his time at La Balize, nearer to the mouth of the Mississippi River, where he could live a simpler life studying the area's flora and fauna and corresponding with scientists and scholars from all over the world. In the summer of 1768, Ulloa announced plans to crack down on Louisiana's considerable smuggling operations by reducing the mouth of the Mississippi to a single channel to improve security; officially he spent his time at La Balize supervising the engineering of the project. At the same time, he also announced that Louisiana would no longer trade with other nations, including France and any of its colonies, consistent with policy in other Spanish possessions. Among the other trade policies enacted at the time were a ban on the importation of French wine and a requirement that Spanish sailors make up the majority of all ships' crews.

== Rebellion ==
In the spring or early summer of 1768, Denis-Nicolas Foucault, who was Louisiana's commaissaire-ordonnateur — the chief financial officer of the colony — under the French, and had continued the position under the Spanish during the transition, and Nicolas Chauvin de La Frénière, who was the Louisiana attorney general under the French and also continuing under the Spanish, hatched a plot to force the governor out. Most of the complaints of the plotters, who included many of the colony's merchants and other elites, concerned restrictions on trade and other economic issues. The conspirators included many relatives, descendants, and in-laws of Jean-Baptiste Le Moyne, Sieur de Bienville, the father of New Orleans, and many of the insurrectionists were members of, or connected with, the Superior Council, created by the French as the colony's chief judicial institution, which gradually — because of lax control of the colony by Paris — had become as much a legislative entity as a legal one.

Joseph Milhet (the brother of Jean Milhet) was sent to villages west of the Mississippi to stir insurrection. Joseph Villeré went to communities northwest of New Orleans. Pierre Marquis was declared leader of the Louisiana militia. In the process, the conspirators arrested the French military officer Gilbert Antoine de St. Maxent on charges of collaborating with the enemy when Governor Ulloa sent him to the German Coast to reassure the settlers there. Balthasar Masan went to the British colony of West Florida to request aid, but its colonial government rejected Masan's requests. On October 28, as riots broke out in New Orleans, Aubry escorted the governor and his pregnant wife to the Volante, the flagship packet boat on which he had arrived in the colony. The Superior Council voted that the governor must leave within three days. He complied, leaving on November 1 in a French vessel, as the Volante was undergoing repairs.

With the Spanish governor out of Louisiana, St. Maxent was also released. The Superior Council drew up the Memorial of the Planters and Merchants of Louisiana on the Revolt of October 29, 1768, a defense of their actions based on Ulloa's supposed tyrannical rule and the commerce-destroying policies of the Spanish crown. It was intended for consumption both in New Orleans and in France, but they delayed in sending a delegation carrying it across the Atlantic. They did not arrive in Paris until 1769, by which time the version of events as described by Ulloa — who sent his accounting to Madrid as soon after setting foot in Cuba from New Orleans — and Aubrey — who sent his mémoire to Paris at about the same time — had become the accepted history. While the Parisian people supported the Superior Council's actions, the French court did not. Many officials refused to see the delegates from Louisiana at all, and none of them ever returned to the colony.

== Spanish response ==
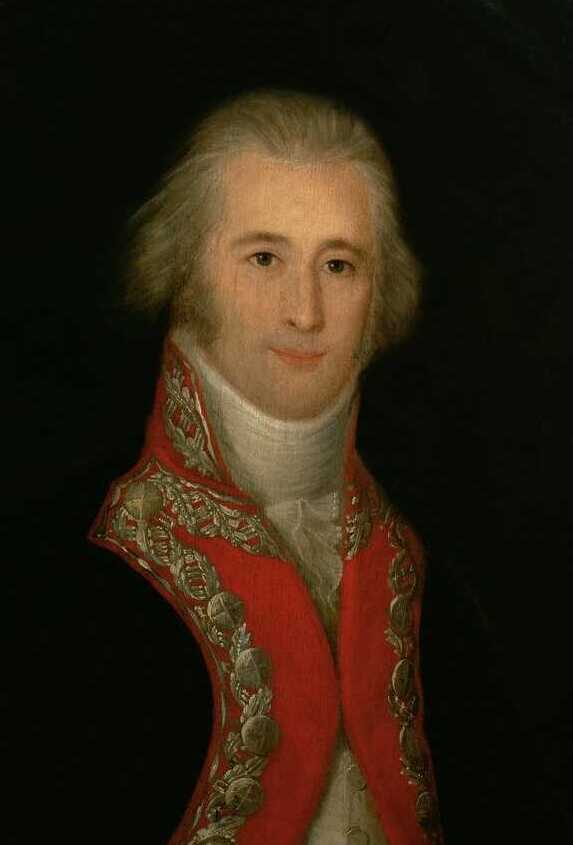
Alejandro O'Reilly, who led the expedition which restored Spanish rule in Louisiana

On July 6, 1769, Lieutenant-general Alejandro O'Reilly set sail to Louisiana with 23 ships, loaded with 46 cannons, 150,000 pesos, and almost 2,100 soldiers, both black and white, whom he had recruited in Cuba. The flotilla was headed by Ulloa's Volante, which now served as O'Reilly's flagship. They reached La Balize on July 21. There, O'Reilly landed Francisco Bouligny, his French-speaking aide-de-camp, who carried a letter for Governor Aubrey. Bouligny headed upstream to New Orleans, arriving there on the evening of July 24. He was met by a somber crowd, who had been alerted to his imminent arrival by a fast boat sent by the garrison at La Balize. The following morning, Aubrey assembled the people of the city, formally announcing the arrival of a Spanish armada of ships commanded by General O'Reilly, whose reputation was well known to them.

On July 27, O'Reilly had a "cordial" meeting on Volante at La Balize with three leaders of the conspiracy, La Frénière, Pierre Marquis and Joseph Milhet. La Frénière declared their profound respect for the Spanish king and noted that no blood had been shed in the rebellion. He blamed Ulloa's "subversion of the privileges assures by the act of cession" for making the rebellion necessary. O'Reilly's reply was succinct: "Gentlemen, it is not possible for me to judge things without first finding out about the prior circumstances." He pledged that he would hold a thorough investigation, and that "seditious people" would be brought to justice. O'Reilly's flotilla arrived in New Orleans after several weeks sailing upstream. O'Reilly disembarked on August 18, having previously met with Aubrey to tell him that he wished to hold the ceremony of taking formal possession of Louisiana as soon as he arrived. A cannon shot announced the beginning of the spectacle, which included the disembarking of all of O'Reilly's troops, which included 90 horsemen. Spanish officials who had remained in New Orleans when Ulloa left joined O'Reilly's entourage. Aubrey read out the transfer orders from the kings of France and Spain, and laid the keys to the city's gates at O'Reilly's feet. The French flag was formally lowered and the Spanish flag raised, and artillery and musket fire rang out, while French and Spanish soldiers cried "Long live the Kings!." The ceremony concluded with a Te Deum in the cathedral.

== Aftermath ==
The next morning, August 19, O'Reilly requested of Aubrey a full account of the rebellion, providing the names of the ring-leaders and their deeds, and the authors of the 'Memorial of the Planters and Merchants'. This Aubrey gave to O'Reilly on the following day. On the morning of the 21st, after reading Aubrey's document, O'Reilly informed him that he planned to arrest and try the leaders, nine of whom were invited to his quarters under various pretexts. O"Reilly accused them of treason, and told them they were arrested. They gave up their swords and were escorted away. Because of the many family and commercial connections between the conspirators and the rest of New Orleans' elites and merchants, there was much trepidation among concerning what would happen to them. O'Reilly put them at ease by telling them that he wanted to administer "precise justice", and that they had nothing to fear. He posted an amnesty proclamation on the 22nd, and another on the 24th telling free inhabitants to come to his residence on the 26th to swear loyalty to the Spanish crown.

The trial itself began shortly after the conspirators were arrested, and did not conclude until October 24. Its form was the Spanish proceso, in which depositions of witnesses were followed by interrogation of the accused. Each one had an advocate appointed for them, even Joseph Villeré, who had died, because a finding of guilty could affect the disposition of his estate. A painstaking royal prosecutor and a university-trained advocate who had come with O'Reilly from Havana conducted the proceedings. O'Reilly's aide-de-camp, Bouligny, was the official translator. The defendants argued that they could not be tried under Spanish law, because Ulloa had never formally received possession of the colony, an argument which they lost. The result of the trial was finding of sedition and treason for all the defendants.

O'Reilly handed down his sentence a few days after the end of the trial. Five of the accused — La Frénière, Marquis, Joseph Milhet, Pierre Caresse, and Jean-Baptiste de Noyan — were sentenced to death on October 25 and were executed by firing squad on October 26; this would also have been Villeré's fate if he had not died. The five are depicted on a frieze on the front of the Louisiana State Capital exterior. Foucault, who was a French official, was sent back to France, where he was interrogated and then given an indefinite prison sentence, of which he served two years. Five other plotters were sent to prison in Cuba, one for life, two for 10 years, and the rest for 6 years. They were released after two years. All of the property of the condemned men — except for their dowries — was confiscated. Twenty-one other conspirators were banished from Louisiana, although one, an aging man, was allowed to live out the rest of his life in New Orleans.

One month after the executions, O'Reilly promulgated new laws for the colony, known as "O'Reilly's Code" or "Code O'Reilly". It combined the Laws of the Indies with O'Reilly's understanding of the Castilian-derived laws of Spain — the Siete Partidas or "Seven-Part Code" — but left in place colloquial French legal procedures which were consonant with Spanish law. The administrative and judicial systems were overhauled, and the courts were decentralized, putting local justices in place and abolishing the Superior Council, the members of which were largely responsible for the rebellion. It was replaced by the Cabildo, a council which was used throughout Spanish America.

The territory remained in Spanish hands until 1800, when on paper it was returned to France following the Third Treaty of San Ildefonso. However, Spanish officials continued to administer the colony. In April 1803, Napoleon sold La Louisiane to the United States in the Louisiana Purchase, in exchange for money and the cancellation of French debts. Late in 1803 and in the spring of 1804, both of these transfers were formalized back-to-back, with the French flag being raised temporarily in New Orleans and again later in St. Louis. Then the French flag was lowered and the American flag raised. The 1804 ceremony in St. Louis, was called Three Flags Day. Elements of French law still remain in the state of Louisiana.

== See also ==
- French Louisiana
- Louisiana (New France)
- Louisiana (New Spain)
- France in the Seven Years' War
