= Lafreniere Park =

Park in Metairie, Louisiana, United States

Coordinates: 30°0′6″N 90°12′47″W

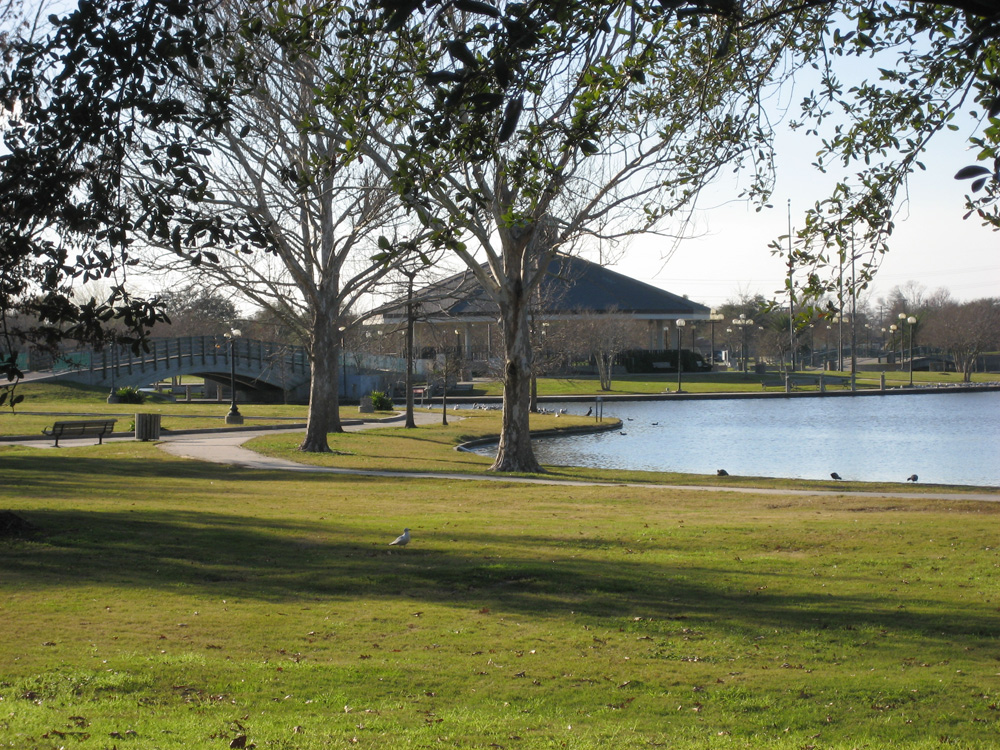
- Interactive map of Lafreniere Park
- Location: Metairie, Louisiana
- Area: 155 acres (0.242 sq mi)
- Opened: 1982
- Etymology: Nicolas Chauvin de La Frénière
- Website: www.lafrenierepark.org

Lafreniere Park is the largest park in Metairie, Louisiana. The park is funded by local residents surrounding the park, and a few dollars are added onto their water bill every month.

== History ==
Nicolas Chauvin de la Frenière (senior) received a 5,000 acre (20 km^{2}) land grant from Jean-Baptiste Le Moyne, Sieur de Bienville, which he used to settle with his family. The plantation was then passed on to Nicolas Chauvin de Lafreniere, Jr. who later became Louisiana's Attorney General. Nicolas Chauvin de Lafreniere, Jr. organized a revolt against Spanish rule in 1768. He was subsequently executed for his part in the conspiracy on October 25, 1769. The land was confiscated by Alejandro O'Reilly afterwards. On part of this 5,000 acre (20 km^{2}) land grant, the Jefferson Downs Racetrack was eventually built. The Racetrack remained in operation until 1965 when Hurricane Betsy devastated the area. Upon destruction of the track, it was rebuilt near Lake Pontchartrain in Kenner, Louisiana. This left the old site vacant, and the idea of a park for Jefferson Parish was born. Construction started in 1977, and the park was substantially finished and dedicated in 1982.

=== Development Timeline ===
Date	Action
February 10, 1973	Voters approve bond issue for the acquisition of the old Jefferson Downs Race Track
August 23, 1973	Jefferson Parish acquires an undivided one-half interest in the Downs property with option to acquire balance within an eighteen-month period
September 27, 1973	Council Ordinance #11376 establishes the Lafreniere Park Advisory Board
June 11, 1974	Jefferson Parish acquires balance of the Downs property
January 2, 1975	Adoption of the Lafreniere Park Master Plan
September 16, 1977	Groundbreaking ceremony for the development of Lafreniere Park
November 6, 1982	Dedication of Lafreniere Park

== Wildlife ==
The park features extensive array of wildlife, including a wide variety of birds, squirrels. turtles, alligators, rabbits, raccoons, opossums and coypu (or Nutria). Commonly seen species are White Ibis, (Canadian, African, and Chinese) Geese, Black Swan, Black-bellied Whistling Duck, and Great Egret. They are easy to photograph from a distance of about 20 to 30 feet. One side of the park contains a marshland with a wooden walkway cutting through it, allowing travelers to get up close with the wildlife.

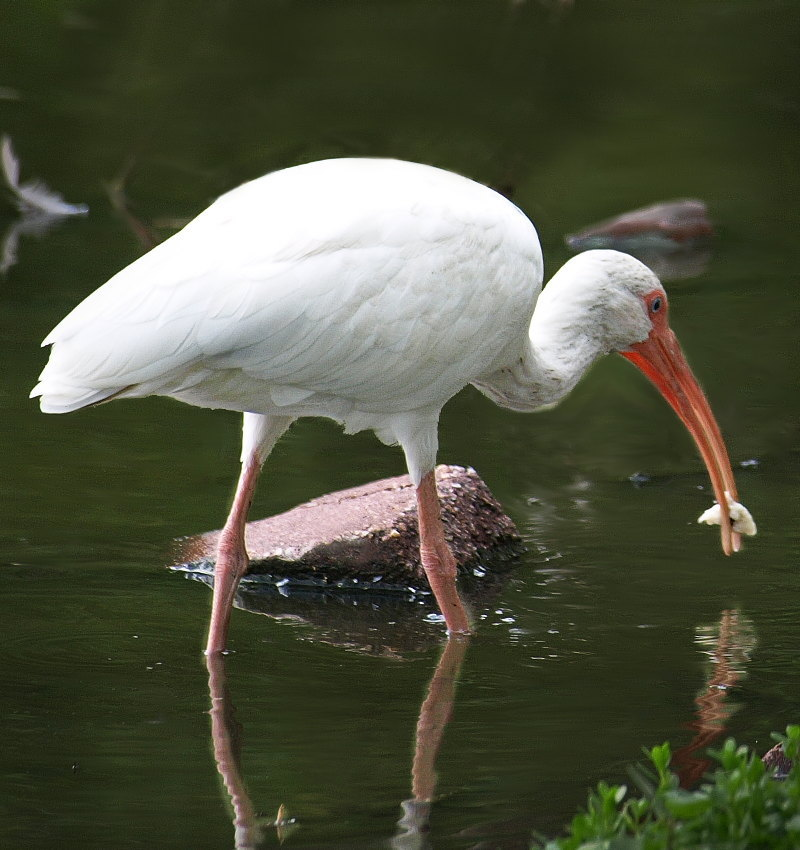
White Ibis foraging in the bayou at Lafreniere Park

== Layout ==
Two large playgrounds provide a fenced-in area for small children to play, complete with benches and covered tables for their parents. The park is also home to a carousel.

In the middle of the park is a man-made lagoon, with three islands. Pavilion Island is near the center, and contains a large pavilion. Marsh Island is home to much of the park's wildlife and features a boardwalk. Large man-made hills blanket some fields, while leaving others open for various activities, such as disc golf. The largest of these hills, located on the north side of the park near the concert pavilion, is colloquially referred to by locals as Coon Hill, due to the large population of raccoons present in the park. A two-mile walking and jogging track encircles the park, with three stretching gyms located at intervals around it.

A 5-acre dog park is located in the northeast of the park, with separate fenced areas for small and large dogs.

== Sports ==
Lafreniere Park contains five fields for soccer, two fields for baseball, softball fields and other multi-purpose fields. One side of the park was converted into a frisbee golf course. The park has hosted the Allstate Sugar Bowl High School Lacrosse Classic. It has also hosted rugby and field hockey events. The park is used for cross country meets. The Loyola Wolf Pack men's and women's cross country teams host home meets in the park. Lafreniere is also a popular place for joggers because of the two mile walking track, which is strictly a pedestrian track. Although the track is for joggers, the park also recognizes the needs for skaters and bikers (referring to bicyclists). Many steps and concrete rails are scattered throughout the park, making these spots ideal places for skateboarders. Large, usually empty parking lots are converted into skating areas for inline skaters (also known as roller skating). For bikers and light traffic, the park contains a large road mirroring the inside of the walking track, which is kept smooth and level.

== Christmas in the Park ==
The park is decorated every December with elaborate light displays, which can be viewed on foot or (for a fee) by vehicle. During the event, children's craft activities are provided near the Pavilion Island parking lots, and local school bands perform on stage.

== Gallery ==
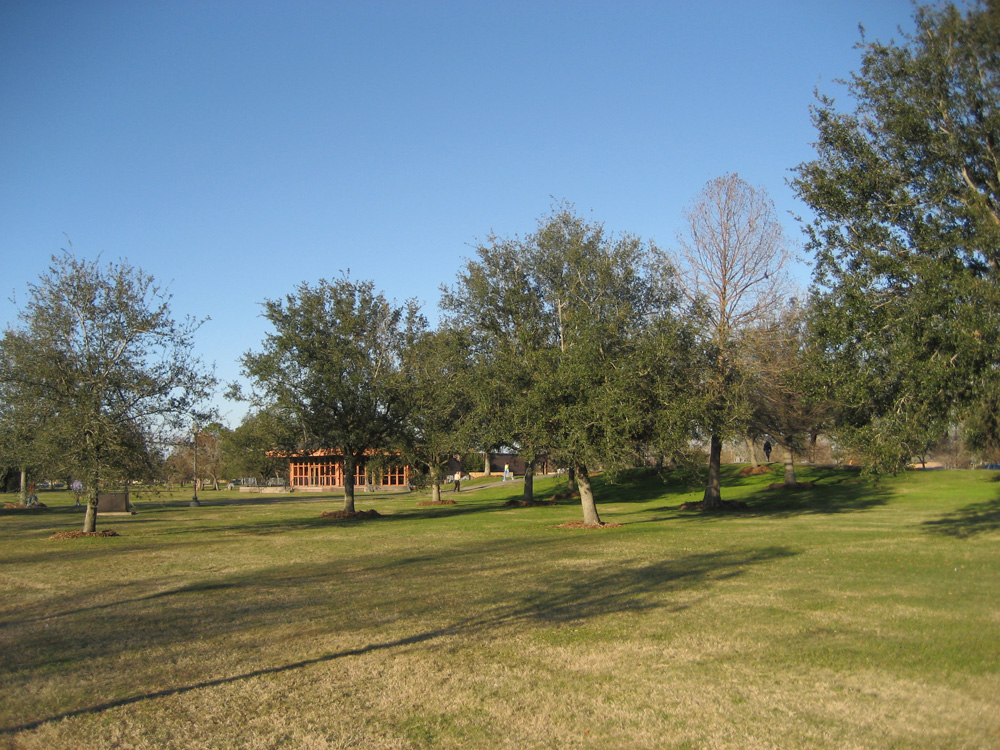

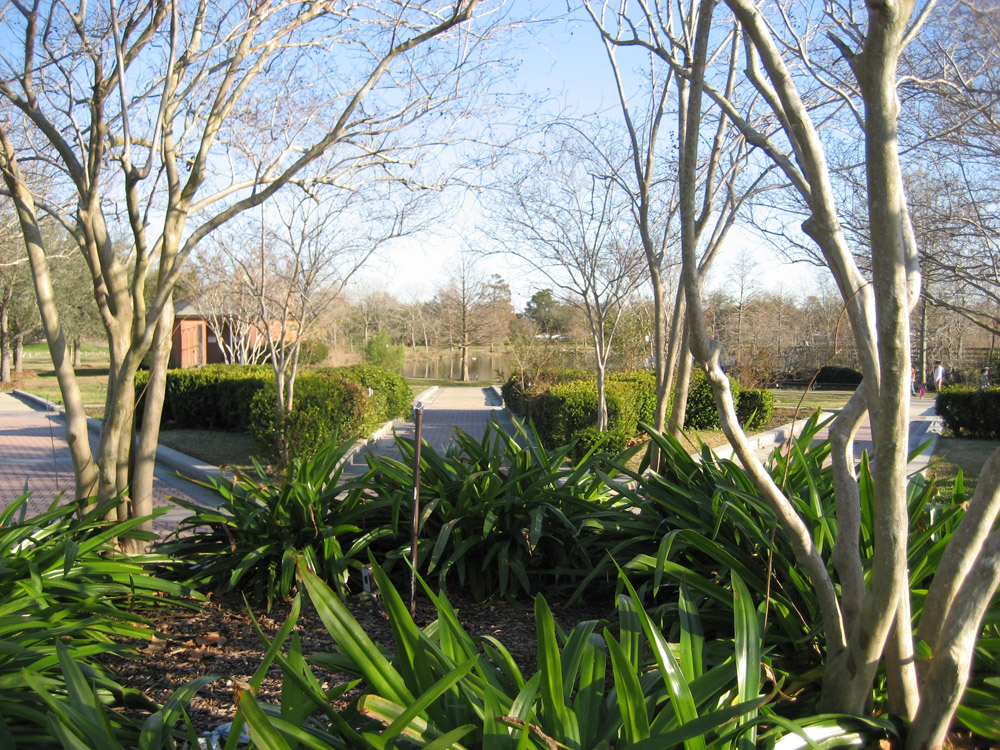

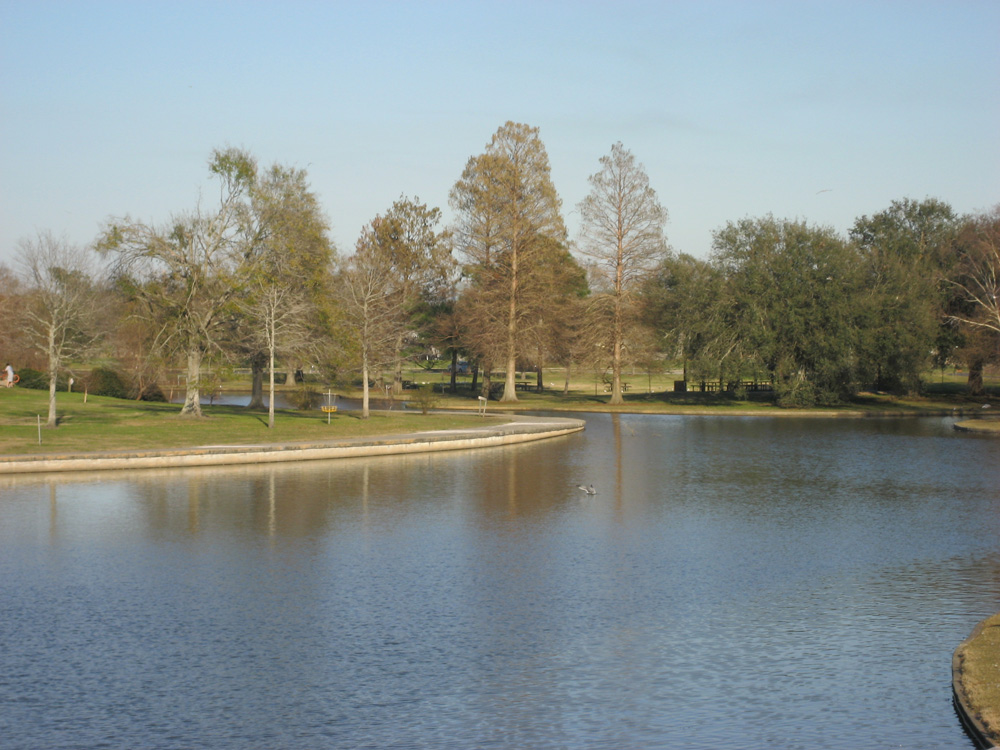

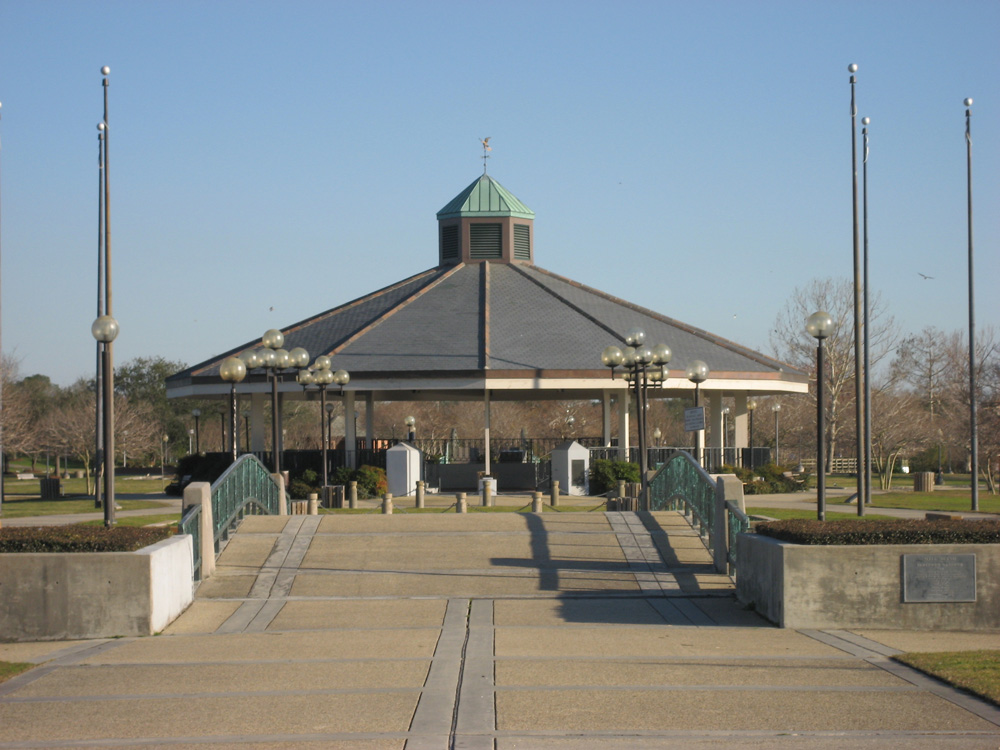

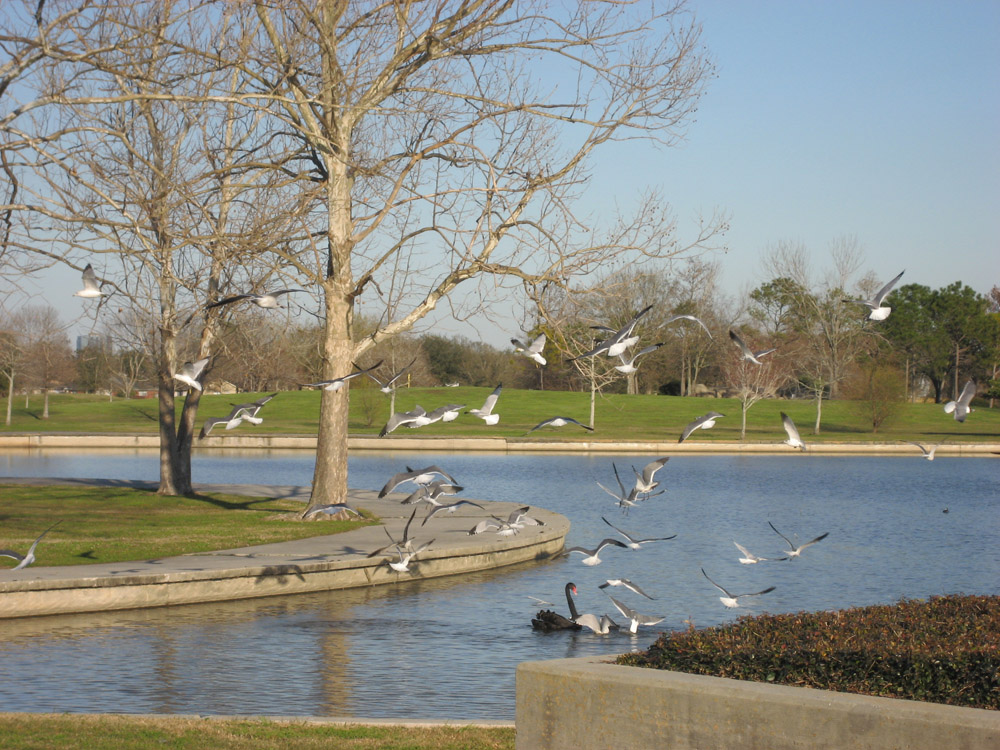

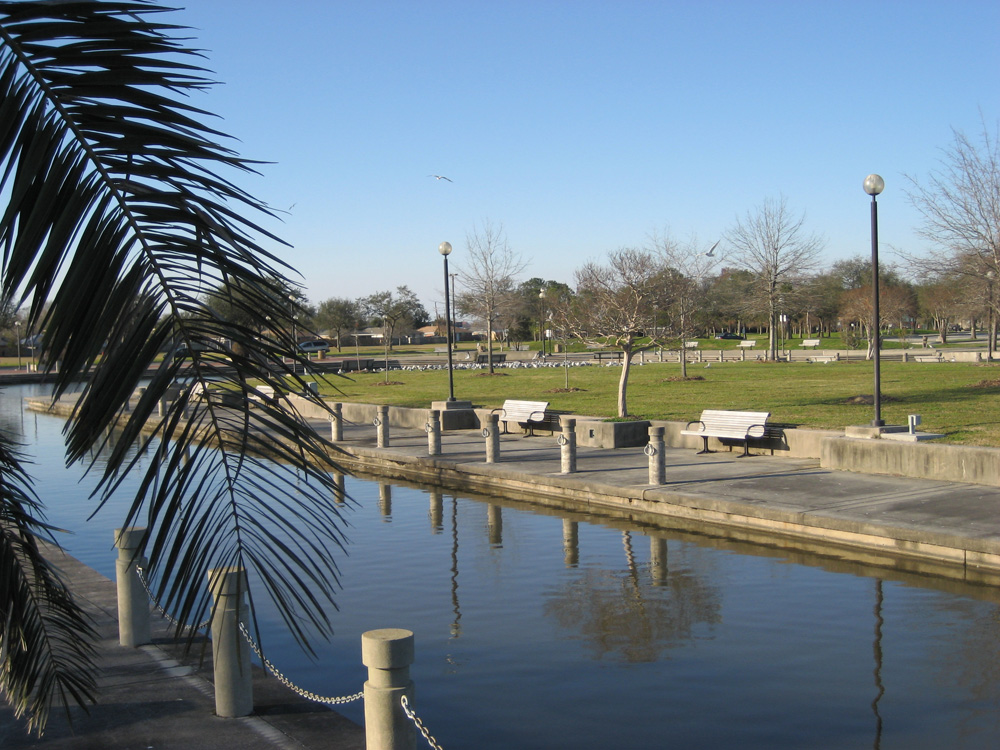

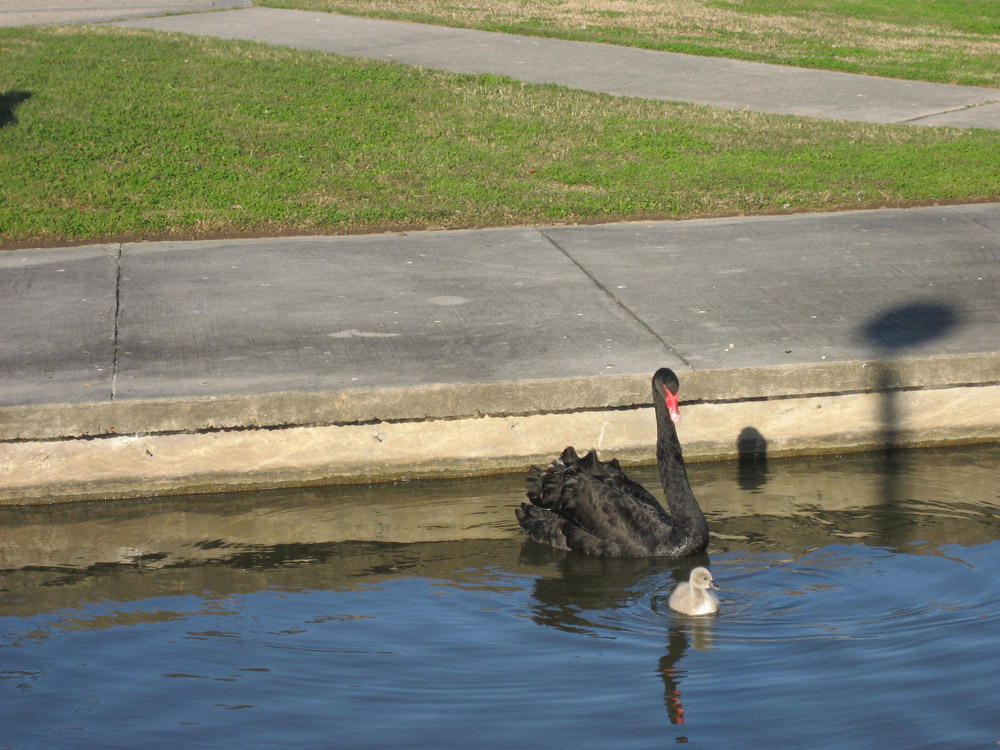

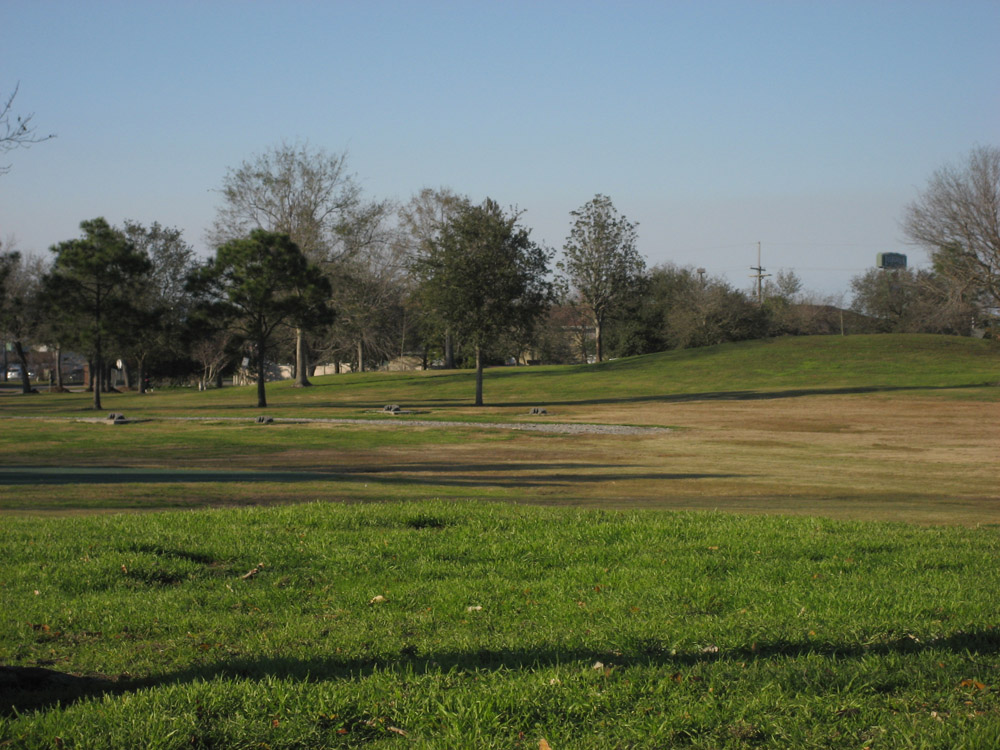

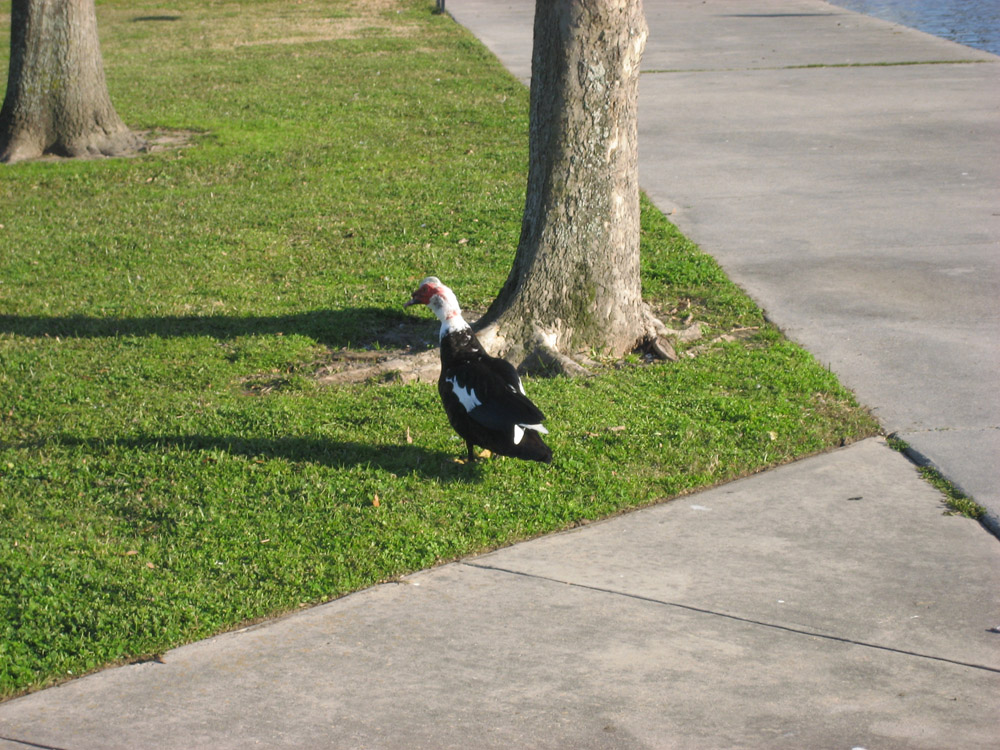

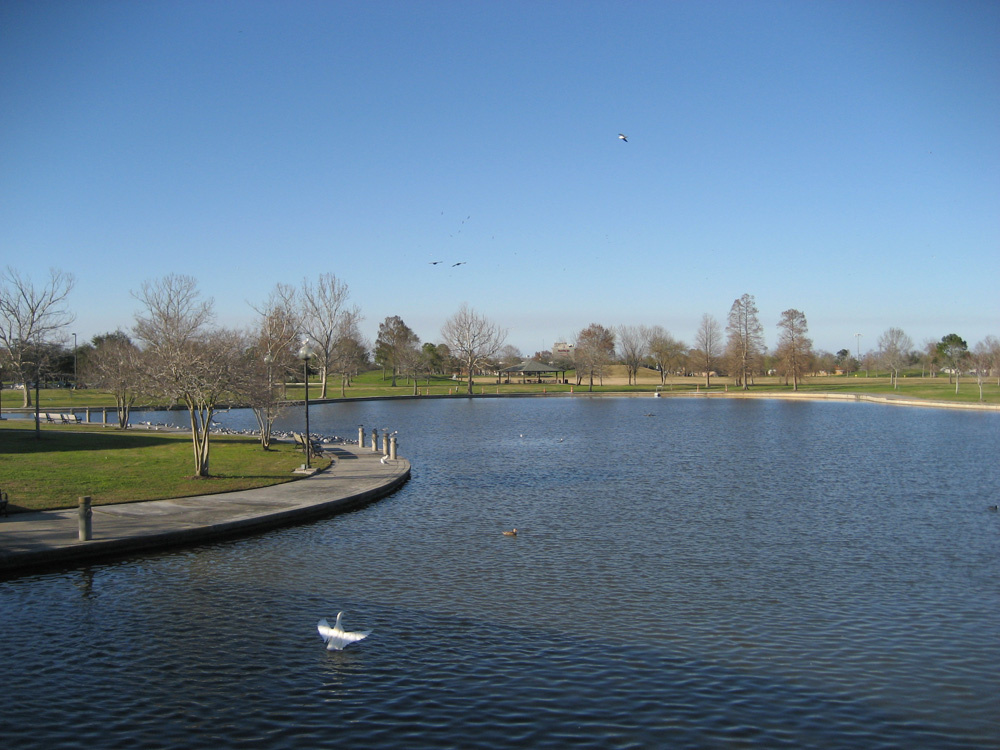
