= Charles Philippe Aubry =

French soldier

Charles-Philippe Aubry
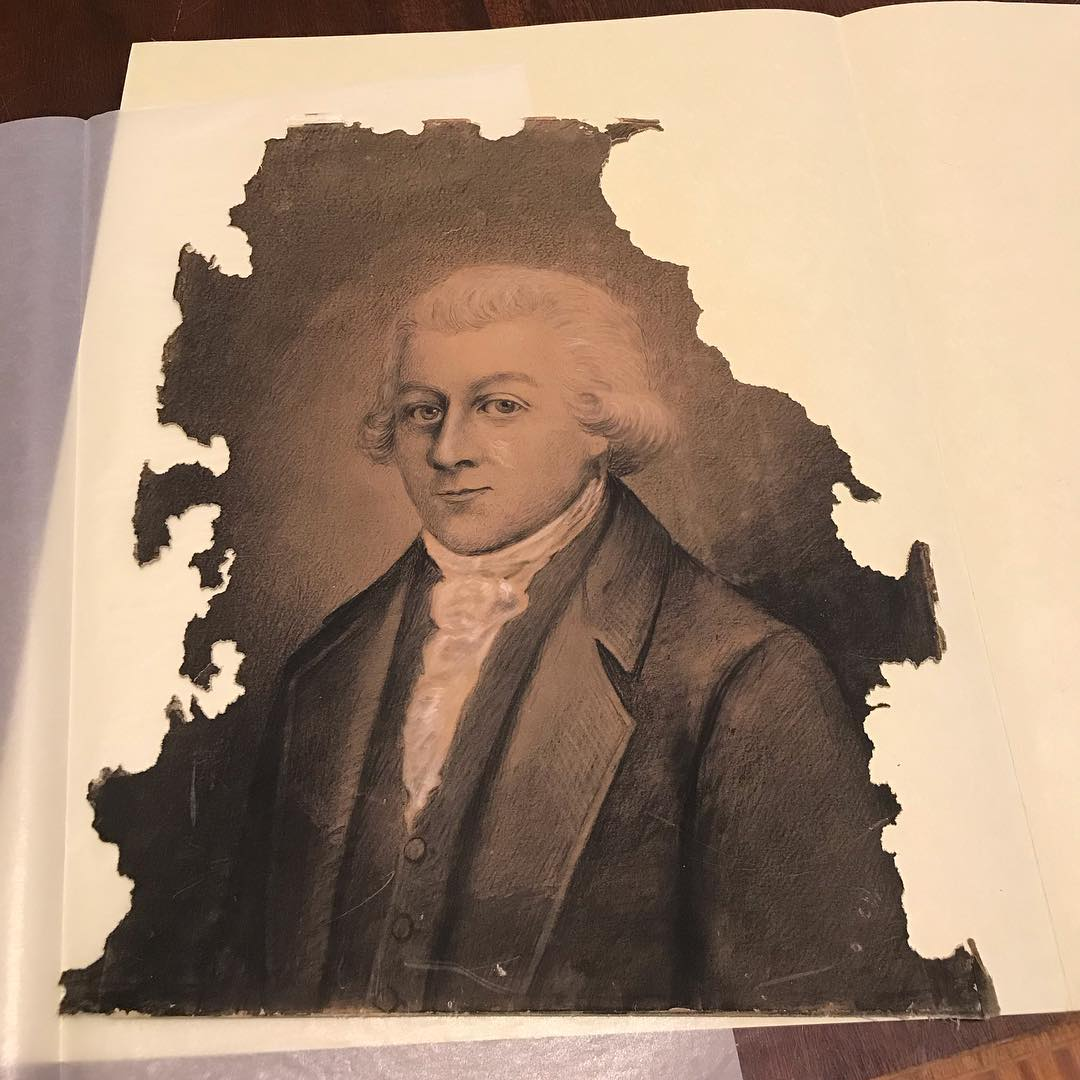
- Posthumous portrait by Isnard Osicran, (c. 1905)

13th French Governor of Louisiana
- In office 1765–1768
- Monarch: Louis XV
- Preceded by: Jean-Jacques Blaise d'Abbadie
- Succeeded by: Antonio de Ulloa; As Governor of Spanish Louisiana

2nd Spanish Governor of Louisiana
- In office 1768–1769
- Monarch: Charles III
- Preceded by: Antonio de Ulloa
- Succeeded by: Alejandro O'Reilly

Personal details
- Born: circa 1720 France
- Died: February 17, 1770 at sea near Garonne, France

Military service
- Allegiance: Kingdom of France
- Years of service: 1742–1770
- Rank: Captain
- Battles/wars: War of the Austrian Succession; French and Indian War; Louisiana Rebellion
- Awards: Order of Saint Louis; Chevalier

Charles-Philippe Aubry or Aubri (died February 17, 1770) was a French soldier and colonial administrator, who served as governor of Louisiana twice.

== Career ==
Aubry began his military career in 1742, when he was commissioned as a second lieutenant in the Lyonnais Infantry Regiment. After serving in the War of the Austrian Succession as an officer of grenadiers, Aubry left France to take a commission as a captain of colonial troops in Louisiana. During the French and Indian War, he was the commander of the French forces at the Battle of Fort Ligonier. He was later captured and imprisoned by the British after the French defeat at the Battle of La Belle-Famille. After his release, he was made a Chevalier de St. Louis and military commander of Louisiana.

Aubry succeeded Jean-Jacques Blaise d'Abbadie as colonial governor of Louisiana in 1765 after d'Abbadie died in office. During his term, he met with members of the exiled Acadian community under Beausoleil and encouraged them to settle in the Attakapas Territory, where there were abundant grasslands available for development of a local cattle industry. Aubry was followed as governor by the Spaniard Antonio de Ulloa, and served as acting governor again after the latter's expulsion in the Louisiana Rebellion of 1768. After the arrival of a replacement Spanish governor Alejandro O'Reilly, Aubry reportedly provided him with the names of some of the conspirators in the rebellion. Soon afterwards, Aubry left for France on the Père de Famille, but died in a shipwreck within sight of the French coast.

In 1920, the city of New Orleans named a street after him (Aubry Street), one block from D'Abadie Street.

| Preceded by Jean-Jacques Blaise d'Abbadie | Colonial Governor of Louisiana; 1765–1766 (acting) | Succeeded by Antonio de Ulloa |
| Preceded by Antonio de Ulloa | Colonial Governor of Louisiana; 1768–1769 (acting) | Succeeded by Alejandro O'Reilly |
