= Antonio de Ulloa =

Spanish Navy officer, scientist, and colonial administrator (1716–1795)

The Most Excellent Vice admiral Antonio de Ulloa FRS FRSA KOS
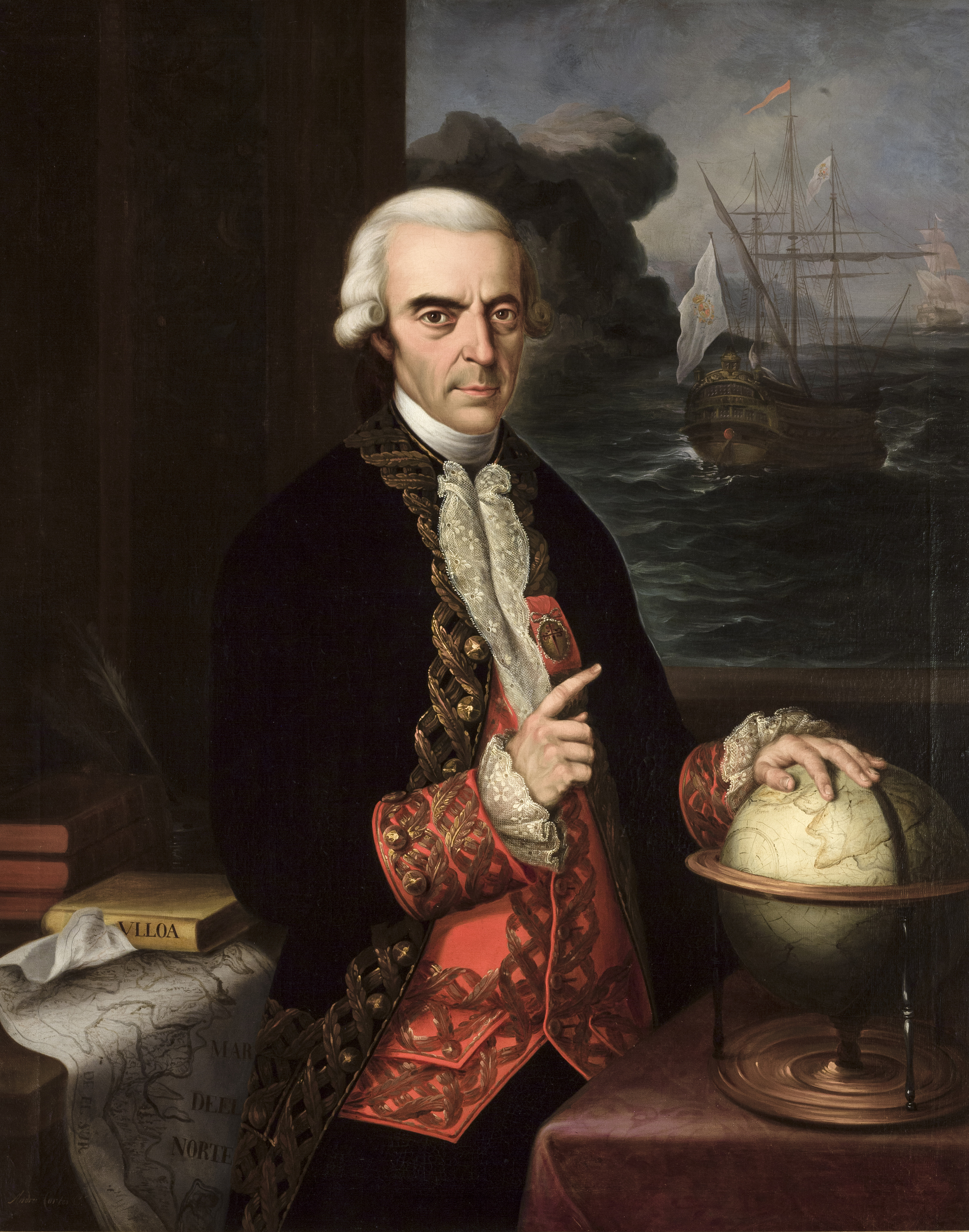
- Portrait by Andrés Cortés, 1856
- Born: 12 January 1716; Seville, Kingdom of Spain
- Died: 3 July 1795 (aged 79); Isla de León, Kingdom of Spain
- Education: Real Compañía de Guardias Marinas (Spanish Naval Academy)
- Known for: Figure of the Earth, Platinum, Ulloa's halo
- Spouse: Francisca Remírez de Laredo y Encalada
- Scientific career
- Fields: Geodesy, astronomy, metallurgy, natural history

1st Spanish Governor of Louisiana
- In office 5 March 1766 – 16 November 1768
- Monarch: Charles III
- First Secretary of State: Jerónimo Grimaldi
- Secretary of State for the Indies: Julián de Arriaga y Ribera
- Viceroy of New Spain: Joaquín de Montserrat; Carlos Francisco de Croix
- Captain General of Cuba: Pascual Jiménez de Cisneros; Antonio María de Bucareli
- Preceded by: Charles Philippe Aubry as French Colonial Governor
- Succeeded by: Charles Philippe Aubry (Acting)

Military service
- Allegiance: Spain
- Branch/service: (Spain) Spanish Navy
- Years of service: 1730–1795
- Rank: Vice admiral
- Battles/wars: War of Polish Succession; War of Jenkins' Ear; American Revolutionary War

Antonio de Ulloa y de la Torre-Guiral (12 January 1716 – 3 July 1795) was a Spanish Navy officer. He spent much of his career in the Americas, where he carried out important scientific work that earned him a reputation as one of the major figures of the Enlightenment in Spain. As a military officer, Ulloa achieved the rank of vice admiral. He also served the Spanish Empire as an administrator in the Viceroyalty of Peru and as governor of Spanish Louisiana.

At the age of nineteen, Ulloa joined the French Geodesic Mission to the Equator, which established that the shape of the Earth is an oblate spheroid, flattened at the poles, as predicted by Isaac Newton. The mission took more than eight years to complete, during which time Ulloa, in close collaboration with his fellow naval officer Jorge Juan, made many astronomical, natural, and social observations in South America. Ulloa and Juan also helped to organize the defense of the Peruvian coast against the English squadron of Commodore Anson, after the outbreak of the War of Jenkins' Ear in 1739.

The reports of Ulloa's scientific findings during his time in South America earned him an international reputation. Notably, Ulloa published the first detailed observations of platinum, later identified as a new chemical element. Ulloa returned to Europe in 1745. He was elected as a fellow of the Royal Society of London in 1746, and as a foreign member of the Royal Swedish Academy of Sciences in 1751.

From 1758 to 1764, Ulloa served as governor of Huancavelica, in Peru, and as superintendent of the mercury mines of the region. There, he fought unsuccessfully against the corruption of the local administration. Following the Seven Years' War, Ulloa became the first governor of Spanish Louisiana in 1766. His rule was strongly resisted by the French Creoles of New Orleans, who expelled him from the city during the Rebellion of 1768. Despite some controversies, Ulloa continued to serve in the Spanish Navy and ended his career as its chief of operations.

== Life ==
=== Family background and education ===
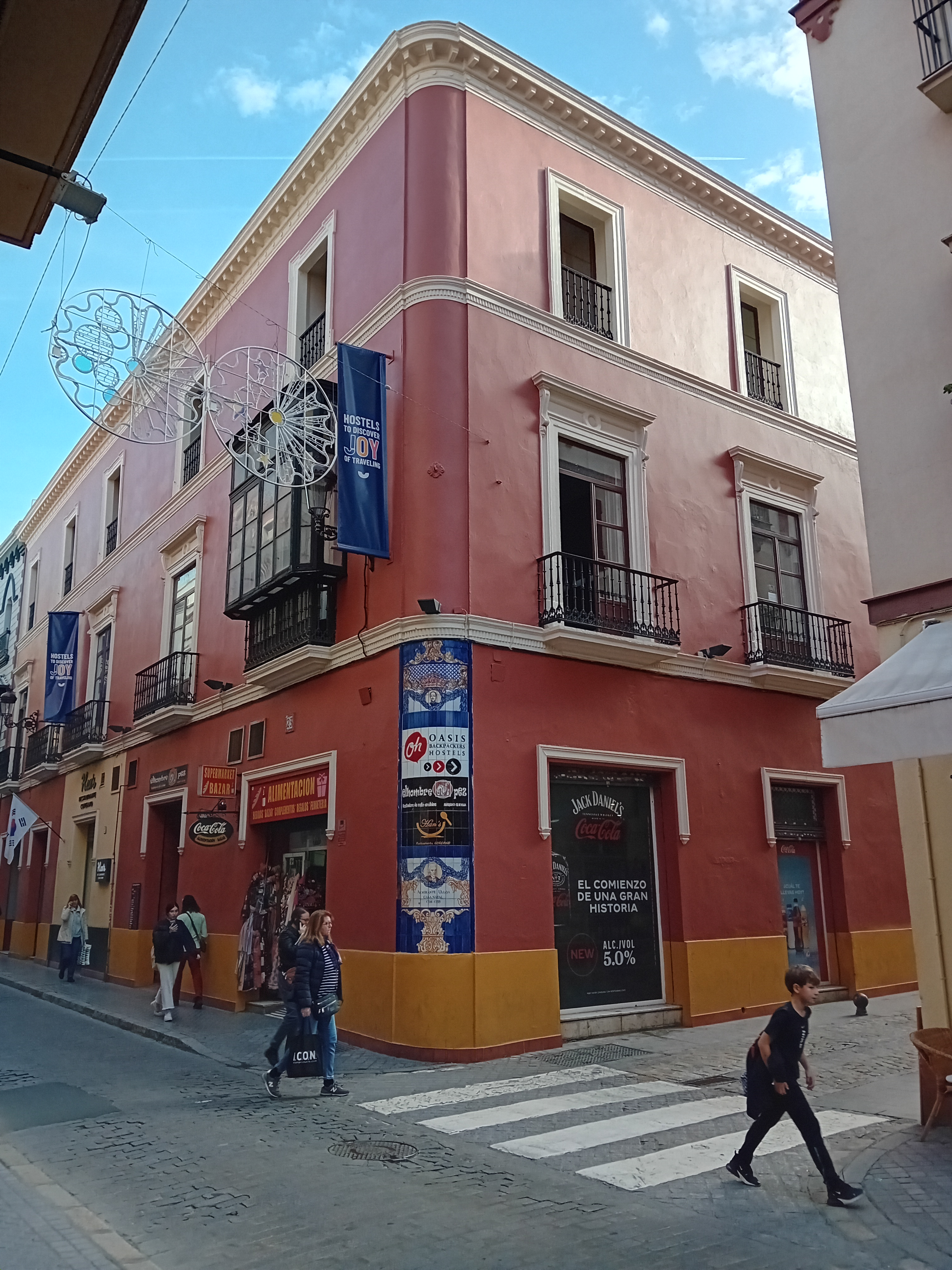
Birthplace of Jorge Juan in the city of Seville, located on the corner of Alfonso XII with Admiral Ulloa (formerly Clavel) streets.

Antonio de Ulloa was born in Seville, Spain, into a socially prominent and intellectually distinguished family. His father, Bernardo de Ulloa y Sousa, was noted for his writings on economics. His brother Fernando would become an engineer and the chief of works of the Canal de Castilla. Another brother, Martín, became a jurist, historian, and member of the Royal Spanish Academy.

The young Antonio was tutored in grammar and science by a priest and learned mathematics at the Colegio de Santo Tomás in Seville. At the age of thirteen he embarked from Cádiz on the galleon San Luis, bound for the port of Cartagena de Indias (in present-day Colombia). After returning to Cádiz, Antonio entered the Real Compañía de Guardias Marinas (the Spanish Naval Academy) in 1733. Soon thereafter he sailed to Italy, where the Spanish navy was fighting to wrest control of Naples and Sicily from the Habsburg monarchy.

=== South American expedition ===
At that time, the French Academy of Sciences was organizing a major scientific expedition to Quito, in present-day Ecuador, to measure the length of a degree of meridian arc (i.e., latitude) near the equator. This was part of an effort to determine in the precise figure of the Earth to settle the scientific debate between the defenders of René Descartes's physics and those who advocated the newer Newtonian mechanics. By comparing the length of a meridian arc at two very different latitudes, scientists would be able to determined whether the Earth is a prolate spheroid (i.e, flattened around the equator), as the Cartesians claimed, or whether it is instead an oblate spheroid (i.e, flattened at the poles), as predicted by Newtonian theory. The determination of the precise figure of the Earth was also regarded as being of practical importance for navigation.

When Ulloa returned from Naples to the Cádiz naval academy in 1734, he learned that a recent graduate of the academy, Juan García del Postigo, and one of his fellow cadets, Jorge Juan, had been chosen by the Spanish Crown to accompany the French geodesic mission to Quito. However, García was soon dispatched to Naples in the context of the War of the Polish Succession and therefore had to withdraw from the geodesic expedition. Perhaps through the influence of his father, Ulloa (who was only nineteen years old) was then chosen to replace García. This was a sensitive assignment, both politically and scientifically. Juan and Ulloa were selected on the strength of the recommendations of the king's chief minister, José Patiño.

The early work of the geodesic mission, led by Charles Marie de La Condamine, was delayed and hindered by a lack of cooperation from the local Spanish authorities. Indeed, in 1737, a personal dispute between Ulloa and the president of the Real Audiencia de Quito, Joseph de Araujo y Río, reached such a pitch that Araujo ordered the arrest of Ulloa and Juan, announcing his intention to have them killed. Juan and Ulloa took refuge in a church and Ulloa then escaped through the cordon of Araujo's men, reaching Lima and obtaining the protection of the Viceroy of Peru, the Marquis of Villagarcía. When war between Spain and Great Britain broke out in 1739, Juan and Ulloa, as naval officers, actively participated in the defense of Peru.

Ulloa traveled throughout the territories of the Viceroyalty of Peru from 1736 to 1744, making many astronomic, natural, and social observations. In one of his reports he described, for the first time in the European scientific literature, some of the properties of a metal that he called platina ("little silver") and which he encountered during his inspection the gold panning operations in the Chocó region of what is now Colombia. This metal would later be identified as a new chemical element, now known as platinum. Ulloa is therefore often credited as the discoverer of this metal.

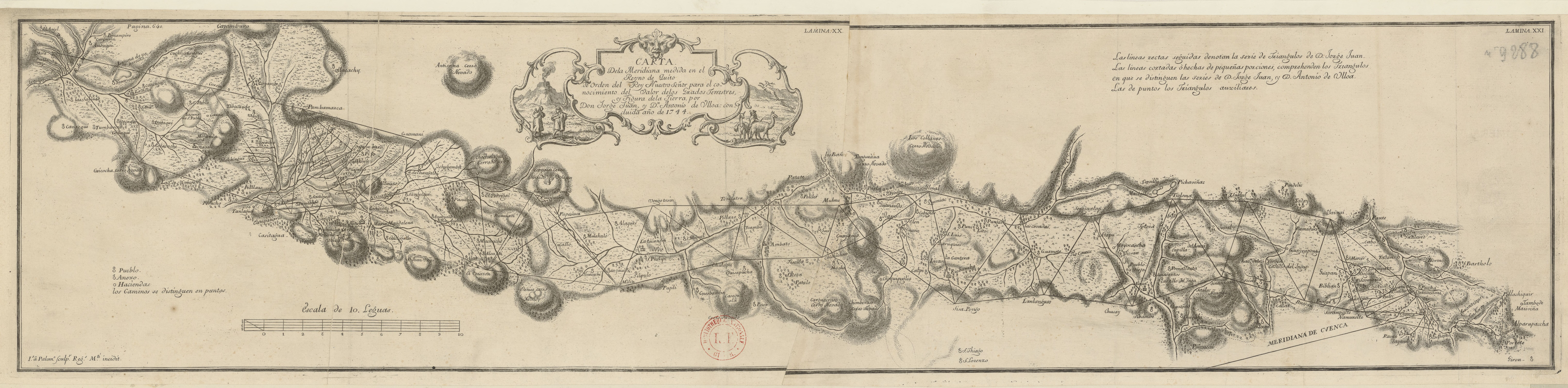
Map by Jorge Juan and Antonio de Ulloa of the triangulation carried out between Quito and Cuenca by the French Geodesic Mission to the Equator, in 1735–1744.

Both Ulloa and another member of the French Geodesic Mission, Pierre Bouguer, reported that while walking near the summit of Mount Pambamarca they saw their shadows projected on a lower-lying cloud, with a circular "halo or glory" around the shadow of the observer's head. Ulloa noted that

The most surprising thing was that, of the six or seven people that were present, each one saw the phenomenon only around the shadow of his own head, and saw nothing around other people's heads.

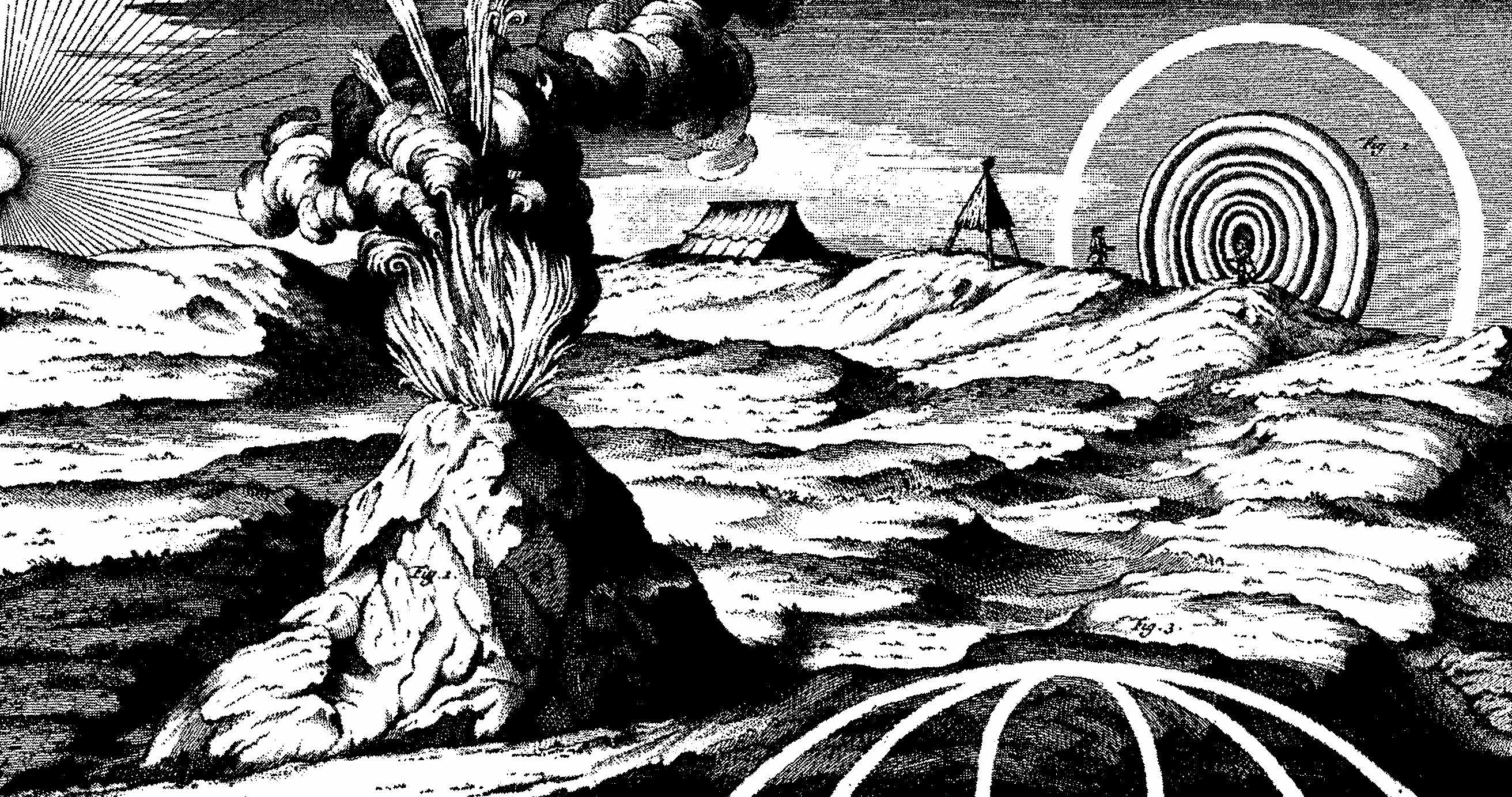
Illustration from Juan and Ulloa's, Voyage to South America, depicting three separate scenes: (1) on the left, an erupting volcano; (2) on the upper right, optical glories surrounded by a fog bow; and (3) on the lower right, arcs of white light near a mountaintop

This has been called "Ulloa's halo" or "Bouguer's halo". It is similar to the phenomenon that later came be known as the "Brocken spectre" after the Brocken, the highest peak in the Harz mountains in central Germany. Ulloa reported that the glories were surrounded by a larger ring of white light, which would today be called a fog bow. On other occasions, he observed arches of white light formed by reflected moonlight, whose explanation is unknown but which may have been related to ice-crystal halos.

The final results of French Geodesic Mission, published by La Condamine in 1745, combined with the measurements of French Geodesic Mission to Lapland that had been published in 1738 by Pierre Louis Maupertuis, decisively vindicated the predictions first made by Newton in Book III of his Principia Mathematica of 1687. These results greatly contributed to the triumph of Newtonianism over Cartesianism among Continental European savants.

=== Return to Spain ===
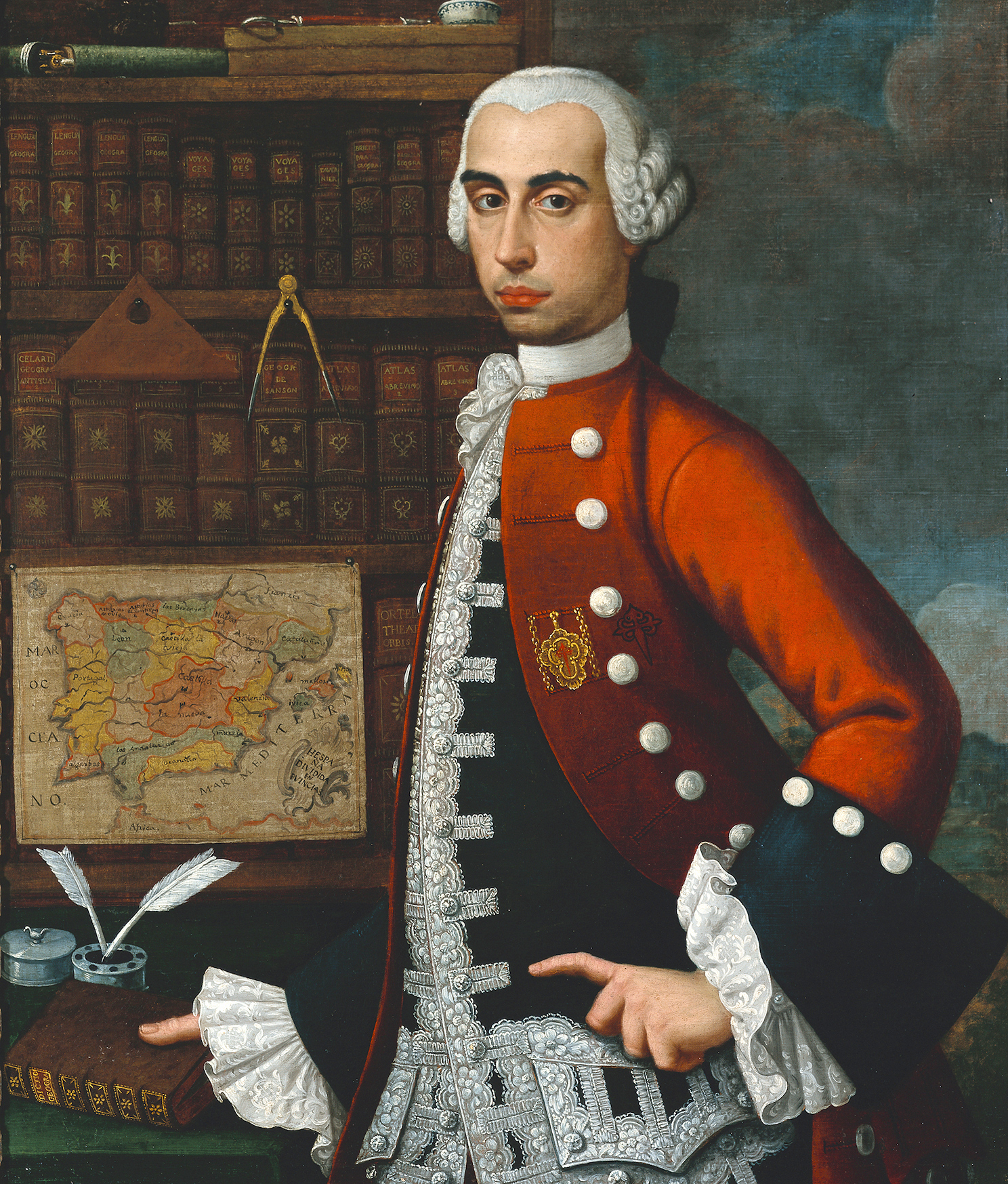
Portrait by unknown artist, Carl & Marilynn Thoma Art Foundation

In 1745, having finished their scientific labours in South America, Ulloa and Jorge Juan prepared to return to Spain. They agreed to travel on different ships and each carried his own copies of all the important samples and records, so as to minimize the risk of their work being lost in the dangerous ocean crossing. The ship upon which Ulloa was travelling was captured by the British Royal Navy, and he was taken to England as a prisoner of war. There, he was soon befriended by leading British scientists and was elected as a fellow of the Royal Society in December 1746. Thanks in part to the intervention of Martin Folkes, the president of the Royal Society, Ulloa was released from British custody and allowed to return to Spain.

In 1749, Ulloa published his Relación histórica del viaje a la América Meridional (Madrid, 1748), which contains full, accurate, and clear descriptions of the greater part of South America, including its geography, inhabitants, and natural history. It was translated into English and published in 1758 as A Voyage to South America (1758).

Shortly after their return to Spain, Juan and Ulloa penned a confidential report to their political patron, the Marquess of Ensenada, on the state of the defenses and administration of the Spanish domains in South America. The document is highly critical of the corruption of both the civil authorities and the Catholic clergy, including their exploitation of the Native American population. That report, titled Discourse and political reflections on the Kingdoms of Peru, remained unpublished during the lifetimes of its authors. It only became public in 1826, after the independence of South America from Spain, when it was published in London by an Englishman named David Barry, who had himself returned disillusioned from the newly independent Spanish America.

In their preface to the Discourse, Juan and Ulloa wrote:

[Governed] by people who often neglect the public interest for their own, those areas [of Peru] are now in a bad state because of the longevity and deep-rooted character of these ills. Justice does not have sufficient weight or reason enough power to counteract disorder and vice. Consequently, it is not surprising that abuses have been introduced into all affairs of the republic: the harm done from disobedience of the law or introduction of unjust procedures; excesses on the part of ministers and people in power, seriously detrimental to the weak and the helpless; scandals in the licentious behavior of all; and an almost continuous general drift away from what is right, desirable, and necessary for well-ordered societies. With no good example to follow and with the senseless spread of evil, it is not surprising that, with few exceptions, everyone is corrupted and powerless to re-establish conditions as they should be.

Ulloa gained international scientific recognition and was appointed to several important scientific commissions. With Jorge Juan, he is credited with the establishment of the first museum of natural history, the first metallurgical laboratory in Spain, and the astronomical observatory of Cádiz. In 1751, Ulloa was elected as foreign member of the Royal Swedish Academy of Sciences. In 1757 King Ferdinand VI appointed Ulloa as Commander of Ocaña (Comendador de Ocaña) in the Order of Santiago.

=== Governor of Huancavelica ===
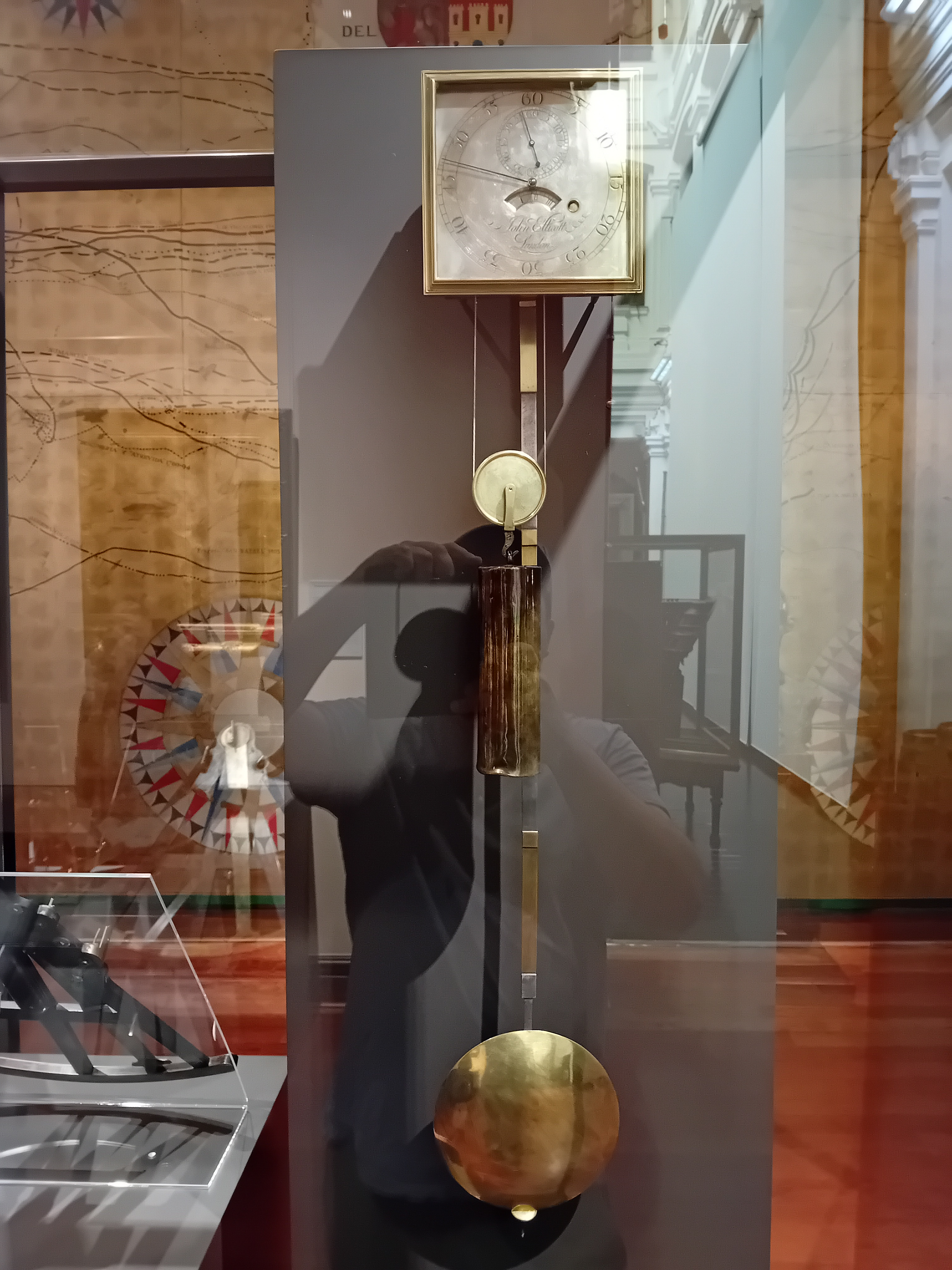
Ulloa's astronomical pendulum clock, which he purchased in London from instrument maker John Ellicott, on exhibit at the Naval Museum of Madrid

Ulloa returned to South America in 1758 as governor of Huancavelica and general manager of the local mercury mine. Mercury was then of great practical importance because of its use in the extraction and refining of silver and gold (see pan amalgamation). The cinnabar mineral obtained from Huancavelica's Santa Bárbara mine was the only significant source of mercury in the whole of Spanish America. The Crown had a legal monopoly on the sale of mercury and provided it at a subsidized price to silver miners, but by the late 1750s the system had become inefficient and rife with corruption.

Local miners often exploited the cinnabar deposits at Santa Bárbara illegally in order to provide the mercury needed to refine unregistered and untaxed silver for the contraband trade. Some of the registered silver miners who received mercury from the Crown resold it at the higher black-market prize, sharing the illegal profits with the Crown officials who controlled the mercury grants. Reckless exploitation threatened collapse of the works at Santa Bárbara. Ulloa fought against the deep-rooted corruption in the local administration and in the miners' guild, but his reform efforts were strongly resisted by the local authorities, including the new Viceroy of Peru, Manuel de Amat y Junyent.

In June 1763, Ulloa wrote to the king complaining of the "horrible storm of persecutions" that he had endured during his five years in Huancavelica, which had turned his "life into a purgatory of continual acrimonies." Ulloa requested to be relieved of his post, which he was finally allowed to do in July 1764. He left a detailed account of his administration in Huancavelica and his unsuccessful fight against the corruption surrounding the mercury trade, titled Relación de gobierno (1763). Ulloa travelled to Cuba in December 1764 and then remained stationed in Havana awaiting new orders from the Crown.

=== Governor of Louisiana ===
Following the British victory over France and Spain in the Seven Years' War, France agreed in the 1762 Treaty of Fontainebleau to cede its colony of Louisiana to Spain. In May 1765, the Crown appointed Ulloa as the first governor of Spanish Louisiana. Ulloa reached New Orleans, the major city and port of the region, on 5 March 1766. From the beginning, Ulloa's relations with the local French Creole elite were strained, and Ulloa delayed taking formal possession of Louisiana while he awaited military reinforcements. In the meantime, he resided at the fort of La Balize, near the mouth of the Mississippi River, issuing his orders via the interim French governor Charles Philippe Aubry.

Ulloa contracted marriage in 1768 with Francisca Melchora Rosa Remírez de Laredo y Encalada, daughter of the Count of San Javier y Casa Laredo, who belonged to one of Lima's most aristocratic families. The fact that the marriage was solemnized in a simple ceremony in La Balize, rather than by a grand affair in New Orleans, accompanied by public feasts and gifts as had been the custom of previous governors, further alienated the Creole elite. Antonio de Ulloa and his wife Francisca would go on to have nine children, among them Francisco Javier de Ulloa, who became the Spanish Minister of Marine and the 22nd Captain general of the Navy.

On 28 October 1768, riots broke out in New Orleans in response to Ulloa's promulgation of a decree by King Charles III that opened nine Spanish ports to direct trade with Louisiana, without assurances that the interests of the local Creole merchants would be taken into account in determining the Spanish monarchy's commercial policies. The governor and his pregnant wife were taken to a Spanish vessel, while the Superior Council voted to demand that Ulloa leave Louisiana within three days. Ulloa complied and departed for Cuba on 1 November. The Creoles' revolt was ultimately crushed in 1769 by forces under the command of the new Spanish governor, Alejandro O'Reilly, who definitively established Spanish control over Louisiana.

After 1776, Ulloa enjoyed the political support of José de Gálvez, the new Minister of the Indies. Between 1776 and 1778, during the Spanish support for the rebellion in North America against British rule, Ulloa helped organize a fleet in New Spain (present-day Mexico). He also advised the Viceroy Antonio María de Bucareli on the proposed construction of a military shipyard in the Atlantic port of Veracruz.

=== Later years ===
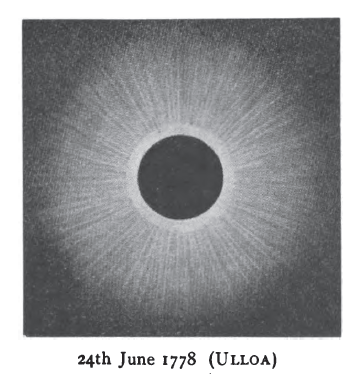
Engraving of the totality of the solar eclipse of June 24, 1778, after a drawing by Ulloa

In 1778, Ulloa commanded the last great treasure fleet that sailed between Cádiz and Veracruz. During the return voyage, he observed the total solar eclipse of 1778, a subject on which he corresponded with the French astronomer Pierre Charles Le Monnier. Ulloa later published his observations of the eclipse in a book printed in Madrid and, in abbreviated form, in an article in the Philosophical Transactions of the Royal Society. In 1779, King Charles III promoted Ulloa to teniente general de la Armada ("lieutenant general of the Navy", equivalent to the modern rank of vice admiral).

As part of the Spanish campaign against Great Britain during the American Revolution, Ulloa was commanded to sail to the Azores, where he was to protect Spanish vessels and attack British merchant ships passing through the area. Ulloa's fleet met with little success on that mission, and he left for Spain 10 days earlier than instructed due to a lack of supplies and the poor condition of some of his ships. After Ulloa arrived in Cádiz in October of 1779, he was ordered to help prevent the British navy from relieving the British garrison during the Siege of Gibraltar. After judging that the ships under his command could not endure the prevailing weather conditions, he asked to be relieved of responsibility for that mission.

The previous events in the Azores led to formal charges of dereliction of duty against Ulloa and two of his captains, Pedro de Leyba and Manuel Núñez Gaona. The drawn-out proceedings ended with their definitive acquittal by the Consejo Supremo de Guerra (the supreme court of military justice for the Spanish Empire, presided by King Charles III) in February of 1782. Ulloa was later appointed chief of operations of the Navy, a position he held until he died in 1795.

== Legacy and tributes ==
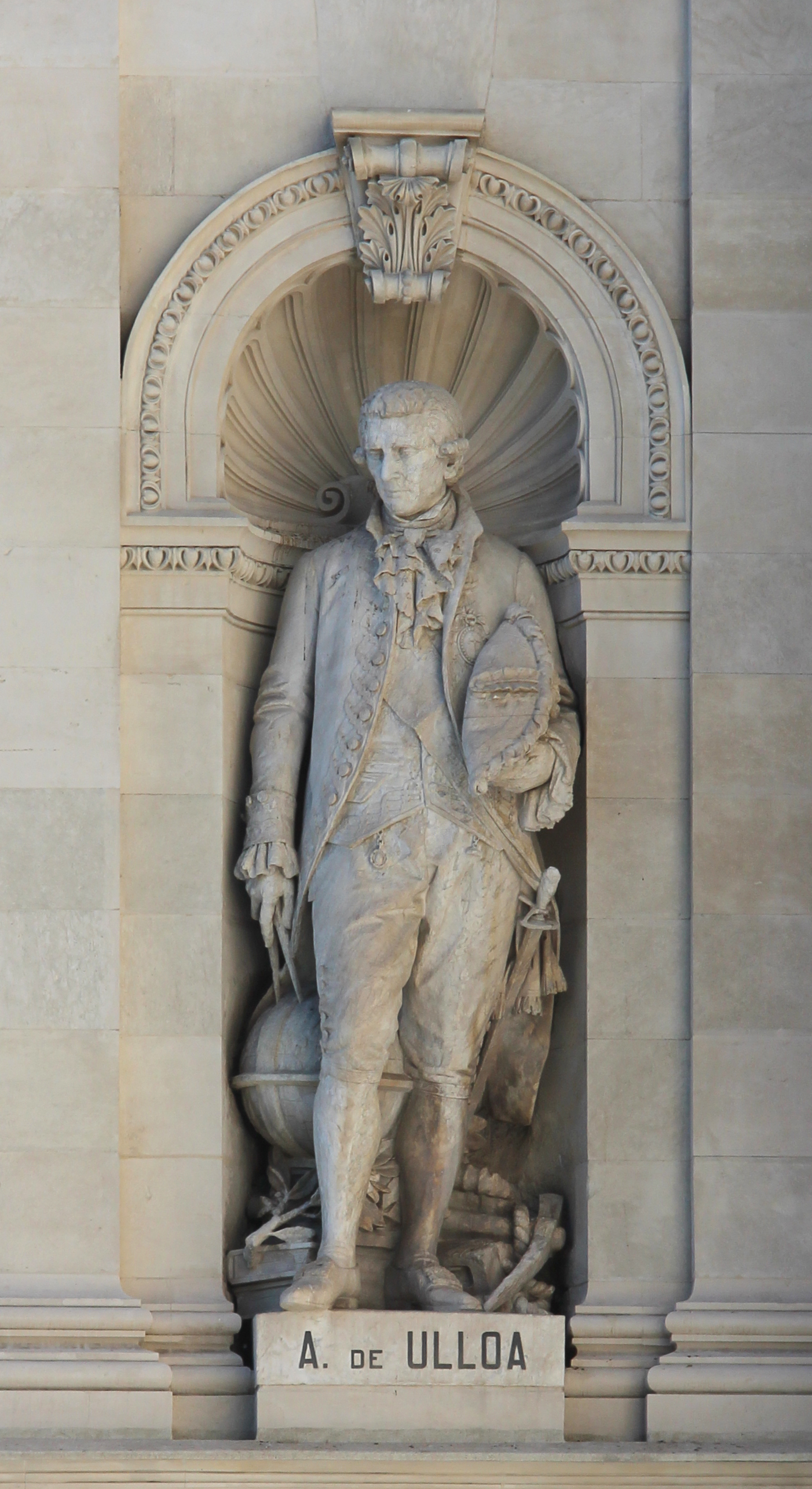
Statue of Antonio de Ulloa in a niche on the façade of the Spanish Ministry of Agriculture, by artist José Alcoverro (1899)

As a scientist, Ulloa is remembered principally for his role in determining the figure of the Earth and for his pioneering reports on platinum. Some historians of science consider him the first discoverer of platinum, even though the material was already known and worked with in present-day Colombia before Ulloa documented it. Moreover, Ulloa's reports identified the material as a "stone" with unusual properties, rather than as a distinct metal. He is also credited for his reports of "Ulloa's halo" and other related optical and meteorological phenomena.

The confidential report to the Marquess of Ensenada, written primarily by Ulloa around 1746 and signed jointly with Jorge Juan, remained unknown to the public until long after the death of its authors. The report was finally published in 1826 by an Englishman named David Barry. Barry had spent some time in newly independent Spanish America seeking investment opportunities, only to become disillusioned with the region's prospects. In Madrid, he obtained a manuscript copy of the report by Juan and Ulloa, which he then edited and published in Spanish after his return to London, under the title Noticias secretas de América ("Secret News from America"). The original title chosen by the authors has been translated into English as Discourse and Political Reflections on the Kingdoms of Peru.

The Discourse paints a dire picture of the administration of the Spanish dominions in America in the 1730s and 1740s, alleging numerous instances of corruption and mismanagement by both the civil and ecclesiastical authorities, as well as by the guilds of merchants and artisans. The report also denounces the exploitation of the Native American population by unscrupulous governors (especially the corregidores) and priests (especially those belonging to the mendicant orders).

The publication of Noticias secretas has generated enduring controversy among historians of Spanish America. While some authors, particularly in Spain, have minimized their importance and even dismissed their publication by Barry as an element of the "Black legend" against the Spanish empire, other scholars have regarded the Noticias secretas as one of the best informed and most interesting first-hand accounts of political and institutional corruption in Spanish America, and as a key source for understanding its persistence in the region after independence. According to the Peruvian economic historian Alfonso W. Quiroz, the work of Juan and Ulloa may "be considered a foundational text in the anticorruption tradition in Hispanic and Peruvian letters". Quiroz connects the contents of the Discourse with Ulloa's later reports on the entrenched corruption that he faced as governor of Huancavelica.

Ulloa was probably buried in the Military Church of San Francisco, in San Fernando, Cádiz. When Captain Manuel Baturone Santiago inspected the church in 1995, he found a damaged tablet that seemed to be marked "Ulloa", but with no identifiable human remains behind it. The Spanish navy then installed a commemorative plaque in Ulloa's honor in the Pantheon of Illustrious Sailors, also in San Fernando.

The street in Seville where Ulloa was born, named initially Clavel, was renamed Ulloa in 1845 and Almirante Ulloa ("Admiral Ulloa") in 1875. A large bust of Ulloa, together with those of members of the French Geodesic Mission to the Equator, adorns the Ciudad Mitad del Mundo monument in the outskirts of Quito. In 2013, the University of Seville opened a new Learning Resource Centre named after Antonio de Ulloa. In 2016 the Spanish Postal Service issued a stamp to mark the 300th anniversary of Ulloa's birth.

== Major works ==
=== In collaboration with Jorge Juan ===
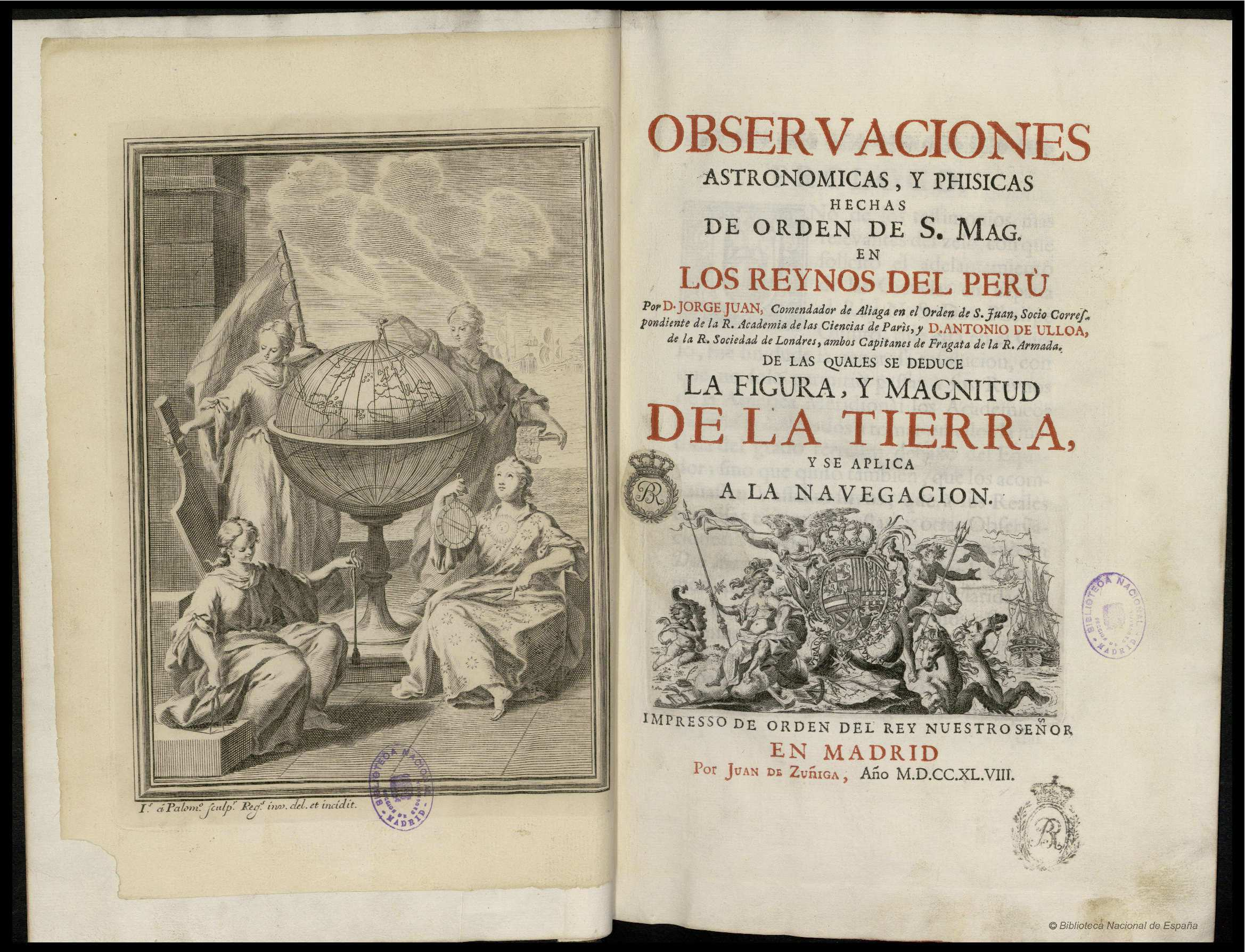
Frontispiece and title page of Astronomical and Physical Observations Made by Order of His Majesty in the Kingdoms of Peru, published in 1748 by Jorge Juan and Antonio de Ulloa.

- Observaciones astronómicas y físicas hechas de orden de S. M. en los Reynos del Perú. Madrid: Juan de Zúñiga. 1748.
- Relacion historica del viage a la America Meridional hecho de orden de S. Mag. para medir algunos grados de meridiano terrestre y venir por ellos en conocimiento de la verdadera figura y magnitud de la tierra, con otras observaciones astronomicas y phisicas. Madrid: Imprenta de Antonio Marín. 1748. Published in English as: A voyage to South America. London: L. Davis and C. Reymers. 1772.
- Disertación histórica y geográfica sobre el meridiano de demarcación entre los dominios de España y Portugal. Madrid: Imprenta de Antonio Marín. 1749.
- Noticias secretas de América sobre el estado naval, militar, y político de los reynos del Perú. London: R. Taylor. 1826. Available in a modern, abridged English translation as: Juan, Jorge; de Ulloa, Antonio (1978). John J. TePaske (ed.). Discourse and political reflections on the Kingdoms of Peru. Norman: University of Oklahoma Press. ISBN 0806114827.
- Garcés G., Jorge A., ed. (1942). Plan del Camino de Quito al Río Esmeraldas - Según las observaciones astronómicas de Jorge Juan y Antonio de Ulloa 1736-1742. Quito: Publicaciones del Archivo Municipal.

=== As sole author ===
- de Ulloa, A. (1749). "Observatio Eclipsis Solaris Julii 14, et Lunae Julii 28, 1748. Madriti Habitae a Domino Antonio de Ulloa S. S: R". Philosophical Transactions of the Royal Society of London. 46 (491–496): 10–13. doi:10.1098/rstl.1749.0006. ISSN 0261-0523.
- de Ulloa, A. (1749). "Extract of so much of don Antonio de Ulloa's, FRS, account of his voyage to South America, as relates to the distemper called there vomito prieto, or black vomit". Philosophical Transactions of the Royal Society of London. 46 (491–496). Translated by Watson, W.: 134–139. doi:10.1098/rstl.1749.0026. ISSN 0261-0523.
- Noticias americanas : entretenimientos físico-históricos sobre la América meridional, y la septentrional oriental. Madrid: Francisco Manuel de Mena. 1772.
- Señales, órdenes e instrucciones para el gobierno de la presente flota. Cádiz: Imprenta de Espinosa de los Monteros. 1776.
- Cuestionario para la formación del completo conocimiento de la geografía física, antigüedades, mineralogía y metalurgia de este reino de Nueva España e instrucción sobre el modo de formarlas. Veracruz, 1777. México: Imprenta Nueva Madrileña de don Felipe de Zúñiga y Ontiveros. 1777.
- El eclipse de sol con el anillo refractorio de sus rayos, la luz de este astro, vista a través del cuerpo de la luna, o antorcha solar en su disco, observado en el océano en el navío "El España", capitana de la flota de Nueva España. Madrid: Imprenta de Sancha. 1779.
- de Ulloa, A. (1779). "Observations on the total (with duration) and annular eclipse of the Sun, taken on the 24th June, 1778, on board the Espagne, being the Admiral's ship of the fleet of New Spain, in the passage from the Azores towards Cape St. Vincent's". Philosophical Transactions of the Royal Society of London. 69 (69): 105–119. doi:10.1098/rstl.1779.0011. ISSN 0261-0523.
- Juicio sobre el metal platino, y el modo más económico de explotarlo en el Virreinato de Santa Fe; manuscript, Biblioteca del Palacio Real de Madrid (1788)
- Conversaciones de Ulloa con sus tres hijos en servicio de la marina, instructivas y curiosas: Sobre las navegaciones y modo de hacerlas, el pilotage y la maniobra; noticia de vientos, mares, corrientes, pájaros, pescados y anfibios, y de los fenómenos que se observan en los mares en la redondez del globo. Madrid: Imprenta de Sancha. 1795.

Government offices
Preceded by Charles Philippe Aubry	Spanish Governor of Louisiana; 1766–1768	Succeeded by Charles Philippe Aubry (acting)
