= Iglesia Vaticana Castrense de San Francisco =

Church building in San Fernando, Spain

Coordinates: 36°46′20″N 6°20′01″W

Iglesia Vaticana Castrense de San Francisco (The Vatican Castrense Church of San Francisco), commonly known as the Iglesia de San Francisco (Church of San Francisco), is a church located in San Fernando in the Province of Cádiz, Andalusia, Spain. The construction of this church dates back to 1785, coinciding with the peak of the Navy in the town. This building is located the main street of this city, the Calle Real, where other important buildings of the city are located.

The church of San Francisco has its origin as a hospice-school of the Franciscan fathers that provided worship services since 1765, although it was the Navy that began its construction in 1785.

== Architecture ==
The church has a Latin cross plan with three naves with a barrel vault with transverse arches and a dome. The transept is a polygonal structure with a tiled roof. There are four Tuscan pilasters framing the linteled door. There is a second bell tower, without a bell which faces west. The church underwent restoration in 1966. Polychrome stained glass windows were added in the upper windows, with Spanish Navy motifs.

== Paintings ==
The church houses some notable works of art: it has a set of ten ovals that is part of an apostolate, the work of Muñoz de la Vega. A painting of the Miracle of the Porziuncola, attributed to Carreño de Miranda, and three paintings by Mariano Salvador Maella, chamber painter of King Charles IV of Spain, are of note. The oil paintings on canvas measuring 120 x 80 cm are anonymous, but are of the Sevillian school of the 18th century.
