= Alejandro O'Reilly =

Spanish Army officer and colonial administrator (1723–1794)

The Most Excellent Alejandro O'Reilly 1st Count of O'Reilly KOA
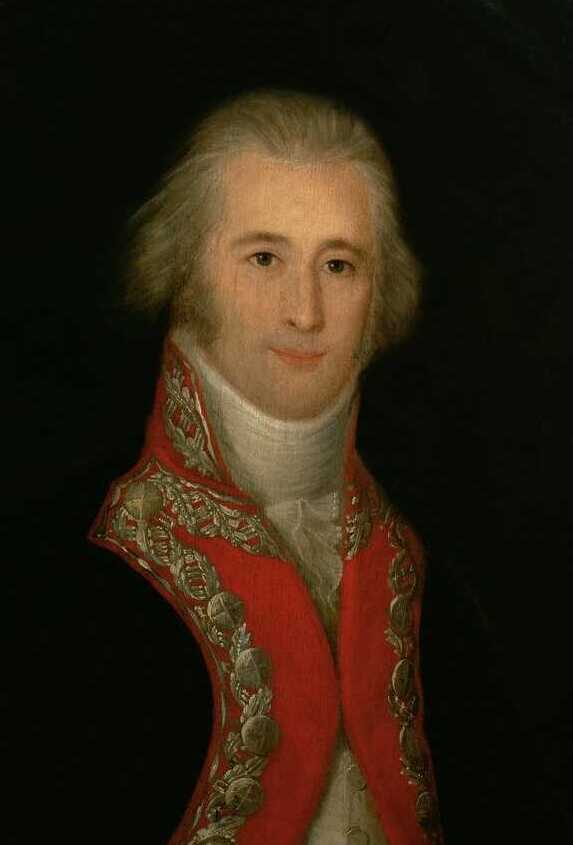
- Portrait by Francisco Goya

3rd Spanish Governor of Louisiana
- In office 17 August – 1 December 1769
- Monarch: Charles III
- First Secretary of State: Jeronimo Grimaldi
- Secretary of State for the Indies: Julián de Arriaga y Ribera
- Viceroy of New Spain: Carlos Francisco de Croix
- Captain General of Cuba: Antonio María de Bucareli
- Preceded by: Charles Philippe Aubry (acting)
- Succeeded by: Luis de Unzaga

Personal details
- Born: Alexander O'Reilly; 24 October 1723 Baltrasna, County Meath
- Died: 23 March 1794 (aged 70) Bonete, Albacete
- Resting place: Bonete, Albacete
- Spouse: Rosa de Las Casas
- Nickname: Bloody O'Reilly

Military service
- Allegiance: Spain
- Branch/service: (Spain) Spanish Army
- Years of service: 1734–1794
- Rank: Lieutenant general
- Unit: Hibernia Regiment
- Battles/wars: War of the Austrian Succession; Battle of Campo Santo; Seven Years' War; Louisiana Rebellion of 1768; Invasion of Algiers (1775); French Revolutionary Wars; War of the Pyrenees

Lieutenant-General Alejandro O'Reilly, 1st Count of O'Reilly, KOA (24 October 1723 – 23 March 1794) was a Spanish Army officer and colonial administrator who served as the governor of Louisiana from April to December 1769. Born in Ireland, O'Reilly moved to Spain at a young age and enlisted in the Spanish army in 1734, serving in the War of the Austrian Succession and Seven Years' War. In 1763, he led the expedition which accepted Britain's handover of British-occupied Havana, overseeing efforts to reform Cuba's governance and defences.

Rewarded for his service and appointed inspector general of the Spanish Army, in 1769 O'Reilly was sent to Louisiana at the head of an expeditionary force to restore Spanish control in the wake of the Louisiana Rebellion of 1768. He accepted the rebels' submission and implemented reforms in Louisiana similar to those in Cuba, though his efforts to punish certain rebels led him to be nicknamed "Bloody O'Reilly". In 1770 O'Reilly returned to Spain and was made a count in the Spanish peerage by Charles III of Spain, resuming his service as inspector general.

In 1775, O'Reilly led an invasion of Algiers, which resulted in a major Spanish defeat which badly damaged his career and public reputation. As punishment, he was briefly banished by Charles III before returning to his good graces in 1776 and being appointed the captain general of Andalusia and governor of Cádiz. O'Reilly resigned from both offices in 1786 and retired, but he was recalled from retirement in 1794 to command the Spanish army as part of the War of the Pyrenees against Revolutionary France. En route to Alicante, O'Reilly died of a heart attack in the village of Bonete.

== Origins and military career ==
Alexander O'Reilly (Irish: Ó Raghallaigh) was born in Baltrasna, County Meath, in the Kingdom of Ireland in 1723. His grandfather John Reyly was a colonel in the Jacobite Irish Army of James II, whose regiment—O’Reilly's Dragoons—fought at the siege of Derry. Like many so-called "Wild Geese" of his generation, O'Reilly left Ireland to serve in foreign Catholic armies. He joined Spanish forces fighting in Italy against the Austrians. O'Reilly swore allegiance to Spain and rose to become a brigadier general.

O'Reilly served with the Count of Ricla in Havana, Cuba, acting as his adjutant and second-in-command. While in Havana, Ricla and O'Reilly received the city back from the British forces that had captured it during the Seven Years' War.

O'Reilly analyzed what had gone wrong with Cuban defences during the successful British siege of Havana. He recommended sweeping reforms to improve the fortifications, training, practices, and troop organization, which were quickly approved by the Spanish Crown. Under the direction of Silvestre Abarca, a Royal Army military engineer, construction of the strategic La Cabaña fortress began according to O'Reilly's recommendations.

In 1765, King Carlos III sent O'Reilly to Puerto Rico to assess the state of the defences in that colony. O'Reilly, known today as the "father of the Puerto Rican militia," took a complete census of the island and recommended numerous reforms, including instilling strict military discipline among the local troops. He insisted that the men serving the defence of the realm receive their pay regularly and directly, rather than indirectly from their commanding officers, a long-standing practice that had led to abuses. Some of O'Reilly's recommendations resulted in a massive 20-year programme of building up the Castle of Old San Juan, now a World Heritage Site.

Returning to Cuba, O'Reilly married into a prominent Cuban family. His wife, Doña Rosa de Las Casas, was the sister of Luis de Las Casas, who served as governor of Cuba in the 1790s.

O'Reilly was an uncle of Juan MacKenna, a hero of the Chilean War of Independence, as well as a cousin of Hugo Oconór, the founder of Tucson, Arizona, governor of Spanish Texas in the late 1760s and then governor of Yucatán in 1778.

== Captain General ==
O'Reilly was appointed Governor and Captain-General of colonial Louisiana while in Spain in April 1769, with orders to immediately proceed to Havana, embark 3,000 troops there, put down the revolt in Louisiana, and re-establish order. Some French colonists, known as Creoles as they were born in the colony, had worked to expel the first Spanish governor after France ceded this territory.

Arriving in New Orleans in August 1769, O'Reilly took formal possession of Louisiana. O'Reilly held trials and severely punished those French Creoles who were responsible for the expulsion of Spain's first colonial Governor Antonio de Ulloa (1716–1795), from the colony. He is remembered in New Orleans as "Bloody O'Reilly" because he had six prominent rebel French colonists executed, in October 1769. In December 1769 he allowed the Acadians who had settled in present-day Arkansas on the Mississippi River opposite Natchez to resettle on the Amite River near Lakes Maurepas and Pontchartrain. Other French rebels were exiled, and some were sent for life imprisonment in the Morro Castle in Havana.

Having crushed the ringleaders who had led the Louisiana Rebellion of 1768 (the uprising against Ulloa and Spanish rule), O'Reilly sent most of his troops back to Cuba. He concentrated on organizing Louisiana's administration and on stabilizing the food supply. It had historically imported grains from northern French settlements along the Mississippi, as they could not be cultivated near New Orleans.

O'Reilly reformed many French bureaucratic practices which were in place before Spanish rule. Again, as in his 1765 mission to Puerto Rico, O'Reilly's proclamations and rulings affected many aspects of life in Spanish Louisiana. He allowed slaves to purchase their freedom and enabled slave owners to more easily manumit slaves. He banned the trade of Native American slaves and abolished Indian slavery. He regularized the weights and measurements used in marketplaces, regulated doctors and surgeons, and improved public safety by funding bridge and levee maintenance.

Having restored public order, O'Reilly assigned the post of Governor of Louisiana to the Colonel of the Havana Regiment in December 1769, retaining the post of Captain-General for himself. Louisiana was firmly placed as a dependency of the military and political establishment in Cuba.

== Return to Spain ==
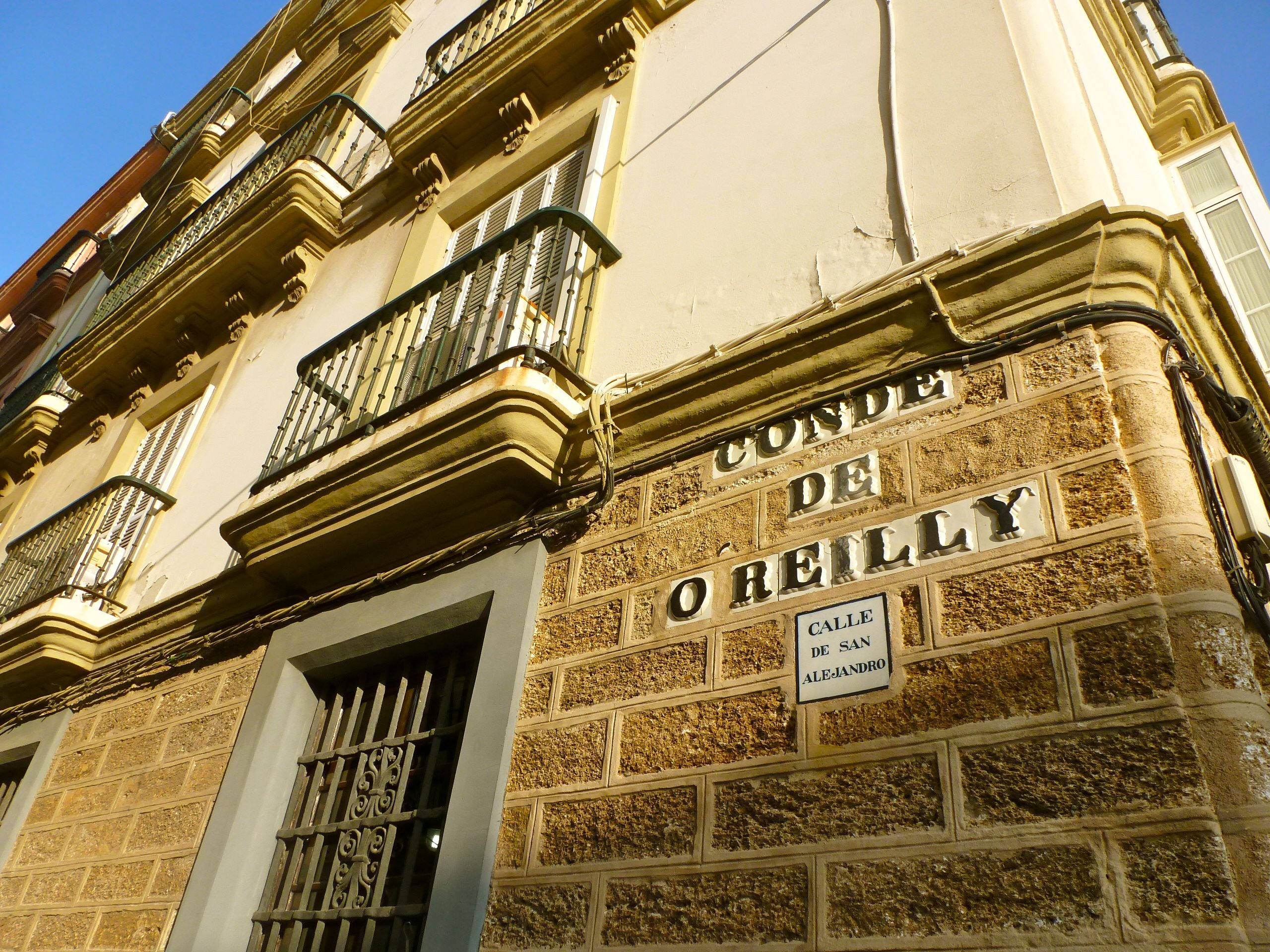
Street in Cádiz, which honours the memory of Marshal Alejandro, Conde de O'Reilly (1723, Baltrasna, County Meath, Ireland – 1794 in Bonete, Spain.

Back in Spain after October 1770, O'Reilly was charged to organize six new regiments to be trained near Cádiz, ready for transportation to the Caribbean should a new war between Spain and Great Britain break out.

In 1775, O'Reilly was given command of a major Spanish expedition attacking Algiers. Although this North African campaign was a disaster, the high reputation of O'Reilly was not destroyed, and he continued to serve as captain-general in southern Spain.

He died in the city of Cádiz in 1794, aged 72, while on his way to take command of an army in the Eastern Pyrenees that had been ordered to oppose invading French revolutionary forces, just after the beheading of Louis XVI.

O'Reilly is buried in the parish church in Bonete in Castile-La Mancha, Spain. A street in Cádiz still bears his name, as does one, Calle O'Reilly/Sráid Ó Raghallaigh, in Old Havana, Cuba. It marks the spot where O'Reilly came ashore in 1763 while the British forces were embarking to leave.

== See also ==
- Military history of Puerto Rico
- Irish military diaspora
- Irish regiments
- Demetrio O'Daly

Government offices
Preceded by Antonio de Ulloa	Spanish Governor of Louisiana; 1769	Succeeded by Luis de Unzaga
