= Jean-Jacques Blaise d'Abbadie =

Canadian politician

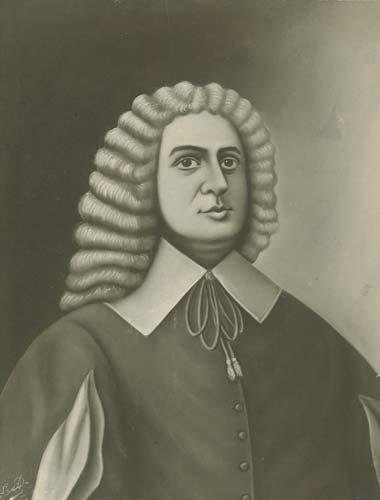
- Portrait by unknown artist

12th French Governor of Louisiana
- In office 1763–1765
- Monarch: Louis XV
- Preceded by: Louis Billouart de Kerlerec
- Succeeded by: Charles Philippe Aubry

Personal details
- Born: February 4, 1726 Audaux, France
- Died: February 4, 1765 (aged 39) Nueva Orleans, Luisiana, New Spain, Spanish Empire
- Resting place: St. Louis Cathedral

Military service
- Allegiance: Kingdom of France
- Branch/service: French Navy
- Years of service: 1742-1761
- Rank: Commissary-General
- Battles/wars: War of the Austrian Succession; Seven Years' War

Jean-Jacques Blaise d'Abbadie (February 4, 1726 – February 4, 1765, New Orleans) was the French Director-general of the Colony of Louisiana. He served from February 1763 until he died in office two years later, in New Orleans.

== Naval career ==
Born at Château d'Audaux near Navarrenx, France, in 1726, d'Abbadie was educated at College d'Harcourt in Paris, from which he graduated in 1742 (age sixteen). He entered the royal service as a clerk in the lumber-receiving department of the Rochefort naval yard. During the next two years he worked as a scribe in the comptroller's office and clerk in the naval repair shop. In 1745-46 Jean-Jacques served aboard a French man-of-war in the Antilles and in Canadian waters. Captured by English forces in 1746, he was held as a prisoner of war until the Treaty of Aix-la-Chapelle set him free, whereupon he returned to working in the French naval bureaucracy. He was promoted to chief clerk of the artillery department in 1751 and to commissary-general in 1757 (at approximately 31 years of age).

Commissioned ordonnateur (administrative chief and first judge of the colonial tribunal) of Louisiana on December 29, 1761, d'Abbadie was ordered by the French crown to improve relations between the colony's feuding religious orders, the Capuchins and Jesuits, and to efficiently administer the colony's financial, police and judicial affairs. Shortly after departing Bordeaux, his ship was captured by English warships. He was again held as a prisoner of war, this time for three months. Following his release in Barbados, d'Abbadie returned to France.

== In Louisiana ==
In February 1763, Jean-Jacques d'Abbadie was commissioned director-general of Louisiana (New France), a position formed by consolidating the former governor and ordonnateur roles. He was charged with the responsibility of dismantling the French garrison and preparing the colony for occupation by English and Spanish forces, pursuant to the terms of the Treaty of Paris (1763).

Departing Rochefort in March 1763, d'Abbadie arrived at the Mississippi River's mouth on 21 June. In July, he prepared for the transfer of the Angoumois Regiment to Saint-Domingue. He traveled to Mobile to assist British forces in assuming control in West Florida and to supervise the transfer of the region's French soldiers to French-held territory.

His remaining tenure in office was devoted to reconciling English colonists and hostile Indians, preventing France from being drawn into Pontiac's uprising, and in maintaining a skeleton force in Louisiana long after Spanish forces were expected to arrive, despite a lack of support from France. D'Abbadie was criticized by New Orleans merchants for favoring the Laclède-Chouteau interests with exclusive Indian trading privileges in Upper Louisiana.

Jean-Jacques d'Abbadie died in New Orleans on February 4, 1765. His remains lie in the St. Louis Cathedral, in New Orleans' French Quarter. He was the only French colonial governor to die in the colony. There is a street in the city named for him, although it's a slight misspelling: D'Abadie Street.

== In popular culture ==
In the video game Assassin's Creed III: Liberation, Jean-Jacques appears as an associate of the Templar Order and the first assassination target.

Preceded by Louis Billouart	French Governor of Louisiana; 1763–1765	Succeeded by Charles Philippe Aubry
