= Bonete =

- Municipality
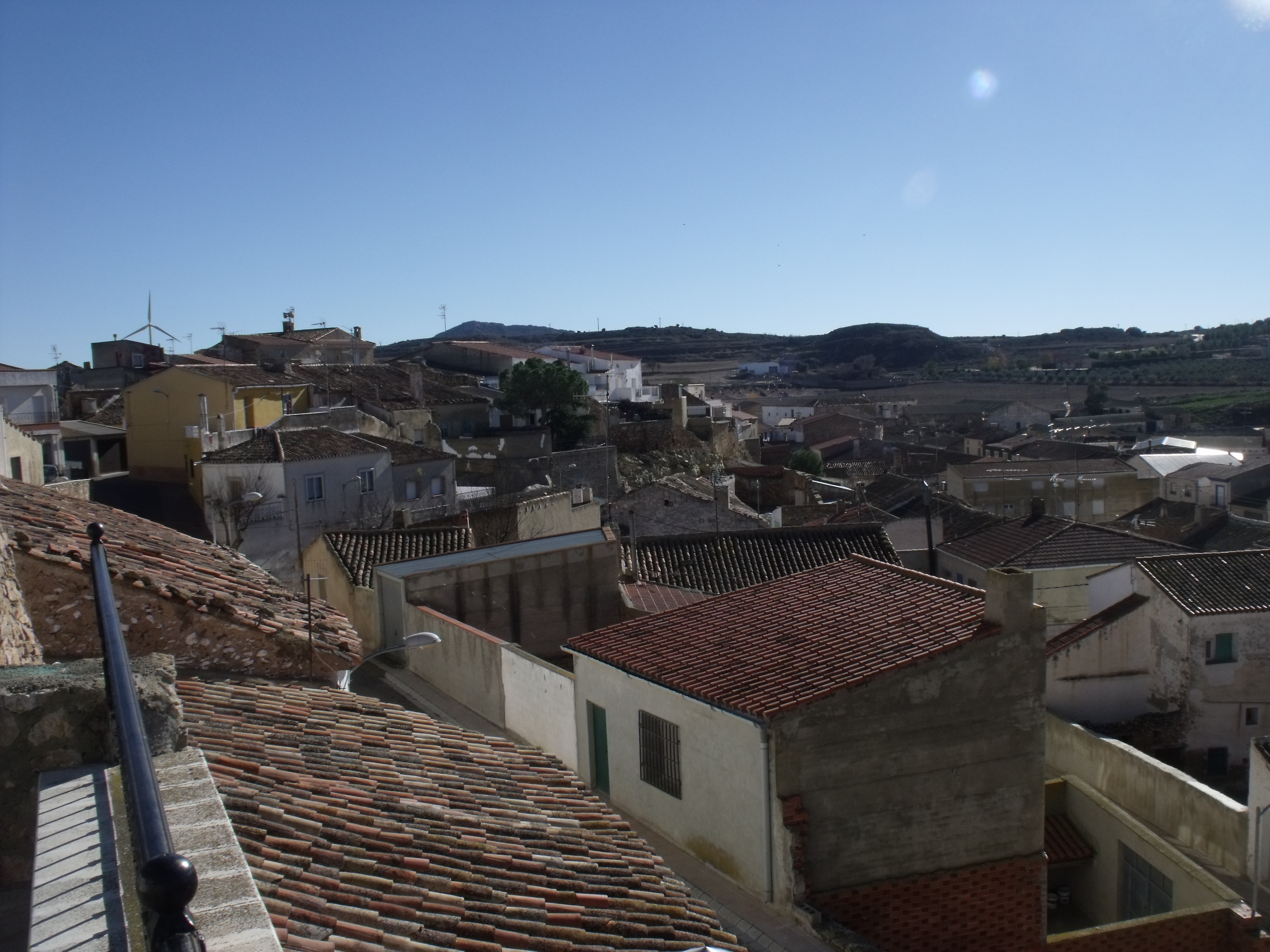
- View of the Town

- Coat of arms

- Location in Albacete Location in Castilla-La Mancha Location in Spain
- Coordinates: 38.86992°N 1.35377°W
- Country: Spain
- Autonomous community: Castile-La Mancha
- Province: Albacete
- Comarca: Altiplanicie de Almansa
- Judicial district: Almansa
- Commonwealth: Monte Ibérico–Corredor de Almansa

Government
  - Mayor: Josefa Mansilla Ortuño (PP)

Area
  - Total: 125.06 km^{2} (48.29 sq mi)
- Elevation: 892 m (2,927 ft)

Population (2025-01-01)
  - Total: 950
  - Density: 7.6/km^{2} (20/sq mi)
- Demonym(s): Bonetero, Bonetera
- Time zone: UTC+1 (CET)
  - Summer (DST): UTC+2 (CEST)
- Postal code: 02691
- Dialing code: 967
- Website: www.bonete.es

Bonete is a municipality in Albacete, Castilla-La Mancha, Spain. It has 950 inhabitants (2025-01-01) and is located at a distance of 54 km (34 mi) from Albacete.

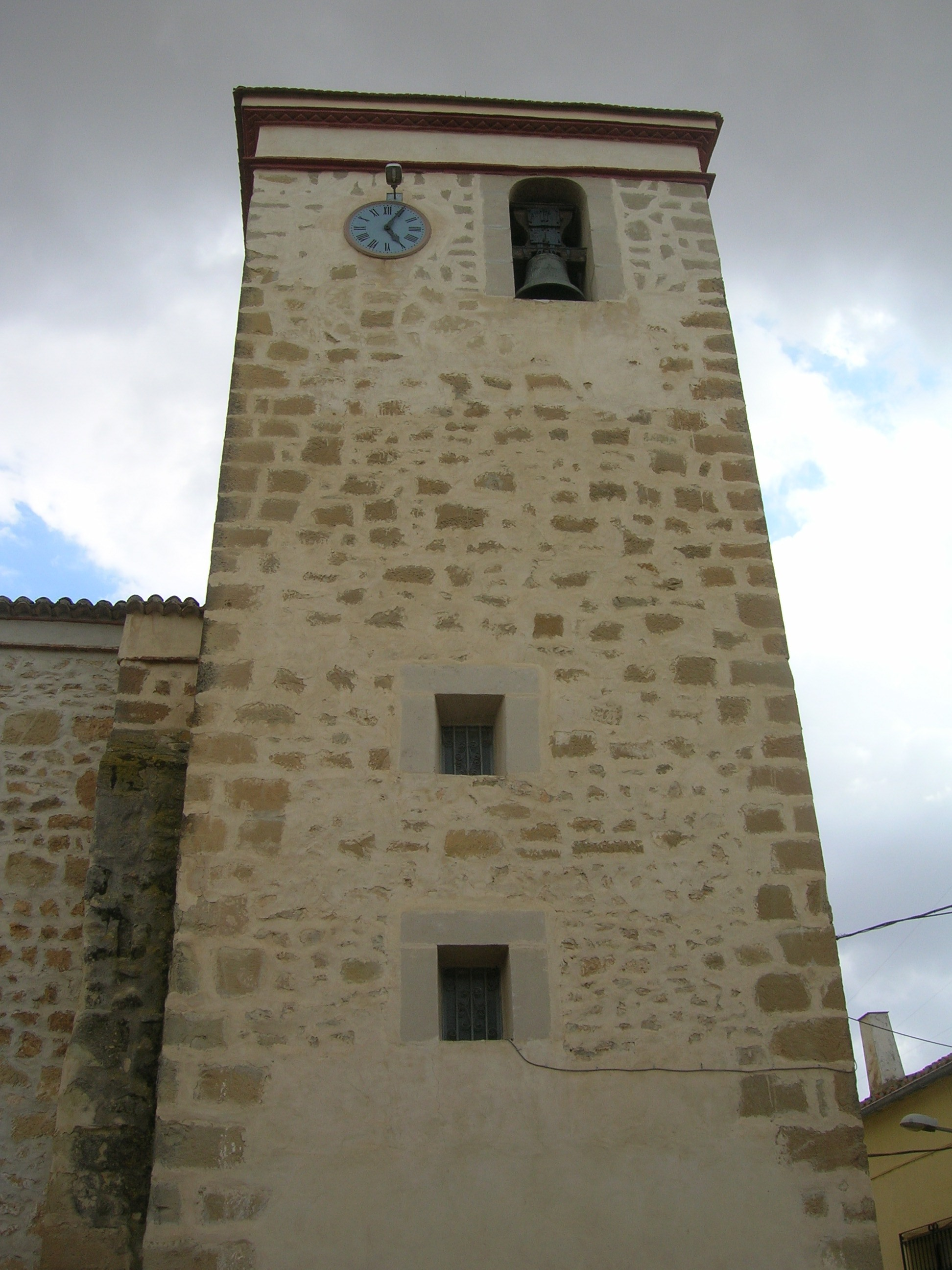
Tower of the Bonete church
