= Opelousas Senior High School =

American public high school

Location
- 1014 Judson Walsh Drive; Opelousas, (St. Landry Parish), Louisiana 70571; United States; 30.4976°N 92.0787°W

Information
- Type: Public high school
- Established: 1894
- School district: St. Landry Parish School Board
- Principal: Gregory Campbell
- Staff: 55.15 (FTE)
- Enrollment: 772 (2023–2024)
- Student to teacher ratio: 14.00
- Colors: Black and orange
- Athletics conference: District 5-4A
- Nickname: Tigers
- Yearbook: The Tiger

Opelousas Senior High School is a public secondary school located in Opelousas, Louisiana. The school serves 840 students in grades 9 to 12 in the St. Landry Parish School district.

== History ==
Education in early St. Landry Parish tended to be administered by a tutor in a private home or through religious institutions. Indicative of the deep religious faith of the area's residents, the Catholic Church provided the majority of organized education in the parish. In 1821, the Academy of the Sacred Heart was opened at Grand Coteau and in 1855 a group of Jesuits opened St. Charles College, also in Grand Coteau.

There was little local appetite for public education, however, and despite attempts at establishing public schools in the area, the results were met with local antipathy. In 1854, for example, there were 2,632 school children in St. Landry Parish and nineteen tuition-free public schools. However it was said that these schools were often of poor quality and citizens interested in educating their children and able to afford to do so sent their kids to one of the private religious schools in the area.

The tide began to turn in 1888 when a committee of 25 residents, led by local dentist Dr. V.K. Irion, petitioned the Opelousas Board of Police to conduct a tax election to help fund a public school in the parish. Three years later, the board granted the petition and the tax was passed by voters. A building site of roughly seven arpents was purchased and construction began in the fall of 1893.

In January 1894, St. Landry High School, the first publicly-funded school in the parish opened to 157 enrolled white students. The school held its first commencement on June 20, 1895 at the Sandoz Opera House in Opelousas. The first graduating class of St. Landry High consisted of just one student, Miss Belle Dupre.

In 1914, a new brick school building, now called Opelousas High School, was constructed on South Street and opened to students for the 1914-1915 school year. By 1952, a second new school building for Opelousas High was built on Market Street and, in 1964, the present-day building was constructed off of Judson Walsh Drive to accommodate the city's growing population of high school students. This modern building was the first fully-air conditioned school building in the area with the school plant itself featuring a new 1,200-seat auditorium and state-of-the-art chemistry labs.

Early educational opportunities for local Black students, like the Grimble Bell School of the 1830s, were almost exclusively available to only the children of wealthy free people of color or free negroes. Tuition cost fifteen dollars, however, the school had up to 125 students enrolled at its peak before it would be shut down in 1860 by White vigilantes. After the American Civil War, the Freedmen's Bureau established schools for Black students and during the Reconstruction era following the war, Opelousas was home to the Peabody Colored School, which was supported by Baltimore banker and philanthropist George Peabody.

Black students with means also had educational opportunities through local churches. In 1874, the St. Joseph Academy was opened by Catholic brothers Father Gilbert and Francis Raymond. This school would eventually by the 1920s become Holy Ghost School, then Holy Ghost High School. In 1897, the Mount Olive Baptist Church also established a school, the 7th District Baptist School, which operated until 1918.

By 1918, prominent local Black leaders realized the need for a new school for students in Opelousas and formed a committee to explore building a new school. Under the direction of committee members Rebecca B. Deshotels, Mrs. G.D. Davis and professor J. H. Augustus, a letter was written to the leaders of the Negro Rural School Fund and the Julius Rosenwald Fund requesting financial assistance in establishing a new Black high school. Dr. James H. Dillard of the Rosenwald Fund accepted the committee's request while requiring the committee to raise $400 to which Rosenwald would supplement an addition $800.

The group received further approval from both the Police Jury and the parish school board, which sold the committee a portion of the old, wood-frame school building used by all-white St. Landry High School. The building was then dismantled and moved to create the Opelousas Colored School, later to be the St. Landry Training School.

The St. Landry Training School opened to Black students in 1919 and existed until 1953, when the larger student population necessitated a new school building. The new school was constructed at 1100 East Leo Street in Opelousas and named after Joseph Samuel Clark, the first president of Southern University and a key contributor to the founding of the National Urban League.

J.S. Clark High School closed its doors in 1969 with the advent of school integration in Louisiana and Black students of Opelousas were able to attend Opelousas High for the first time. Integration at Opelousas High was measured. In the 1969-70 school year there were two Opelousas High Schools; ninth and tenth-grade students attended the former J.S. Clark High School (now also called Opelousas High) while eleventh and twelfth-graders went to OHS. The next year, sophomores moved to the main campus while freshmen were split between Opelousas Middle School and the former Clark High School (now called East Middle School). Freshman would not attend school at the main campus until the 1996-97 school year.

== Academics ==
At Opelousas High School, 11% of students scored at or above the proficient level for math (compared to the district average of 30%), and 18% scored at or above that level for reading (district average of 39%). Participation in Advanced Placement coursework and exams among students is at 29%.

=== Clubs and organizations ===
- Beta Club
- Book Club
- Cheer Squad
- FBLA-PBL
- Fellowship of Christian Athletes
- Family, Career and Community Leaders of America
- FFA
- French Club
- French National Honor Society
- FTA
- HOSA
- Jobs for America's Graduates (JAG)
- National Honor Society
- Science Club
- Science Olympiad
- Spanish Club
- Spanish National Honor Society
- Student Council

== Demographics ==
The school’s minority student enrollment is 91.1%. The student population is made up of 48% female students and 52% male students. The school enrolls 73% economically disadvantaged students.

== Athletics ==
The Opelousas Tigers compete in District 5-4A of the Louisiana High School Athletic Association.

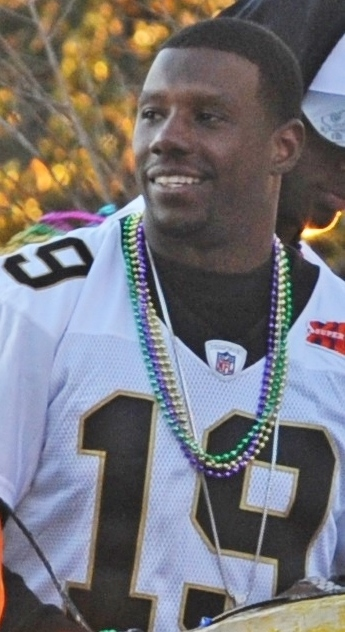
Devery Henderson graduated from Opelousas High School in 2000.

=== State Championships ===
Girls basketball

- (1) 1966

== Notable alumni ==
- Daniel Baldridge, former NFL offensive lineman for the Jacksonville Jaguars
- Rod Bernard, singer and pioneer of the "swamp pop" musical genre.
- Cindy Courville, first US Ambassador to the African Union.
- Antoinette Frank, former New Orleans Police officer and current death-row inmate at the Louisiana Correctional Institute for Women.
- Devery Henderson, former NFL wide receiver for the New Orleans Saints.
- Charles Michael Jarrell, Roman Catholic bishop.
- Paul Prudhomme, celebrity chef who popularized Cajun and Creole cuisine.
