= Opelousas Colored School =

School in St. Landry Parish, Louisiana (1919–1953)

Location
- Corner of Vine Street and Academy Street, Opelousas, St. Landry Parish, Louisiana, United States; 30.530867°N 92.074733°W

Information
- Other names: Opelousas Training School, St. Landry Parish Training School (1942–1969)
- Opened: 1919
- Closed: 1953
- Succeeded by: J.S. Clark High School (1953–1970)

Opelousas Colored School (1919–1953) was a public segregated school for African American students in Opelousas, Louisiana, United States. It was the first public school for Black students in the city. It was known as St. Landry Parish Training School by 1942, and was succeeded by J.S. Clark High School from 1953 to 1970.

A historical marker for the school exists near the first campus location since 2004.

== History ==
The earliest African American school in the St. Landry Parish was the Grimble Bell School in Washington, Louisiana, founded in the 1830s, and shut down in 1860 by White vigilantes. This was followed by new African American schools formed after the end of the American Civil War, The Freedman’s School and the Peabody School.

In 1918, the Opelousas Colored School needed a larger building, and city council suggested they move into the former St. Landry High School building on North Market Street, which was constructed in 1893 and vacant since 1915. The building was moved in 1919 to the corner of Vine and Academy streets.

In 1942, the school name changed to St. Landry Parish Training School (sometimes written as Opelousas Training School), and the curriculum shifted to a focus on teacher training. The St. Landry Parish Training School closed in 1953, because their larger student population necessitated a new, larger school building. The former St. Landry Parish Training School building was demolished in 1961.

== J.S. Clark High School ==
In response to the closure of the Opelousas Colored School, the new J.S. Clark High School was constructed at 1100 East Leo Street in Opelousas. It was named after Joseph Samuel Clark, the first president of Southern University and a key contributor to the founding of the National Urban League. The U.S. Supreme Court decision Brown v. Board of Education (1954) ruled school segregation to be unconstitutional, but the state of Louisiana delayed ending the practice. J. S. Clark High School and Opelousas High School were merged in c. 1969 – c. 1970, and both schools became Opelousas High School (OHS).

J.S. Clark High School colors were maroon and white, and the mascot was a bulldog. The school's track team were champions in 1966. Alumni include Olympic gold medal winning hurdler Rodney Milburn. The site of the former J.S. Clark High School also has a historical marker, and a memorial walkway. The building used for J.S. Clark High was turned into East Junior High School, followed by Magnet Academy for Cultural Arts starting in 2005.

== See also ==
- Colored, racial exonym
- Colored school
- Training school (United States)
