= Karl Dunbar =

American football player and coach (born 1967)

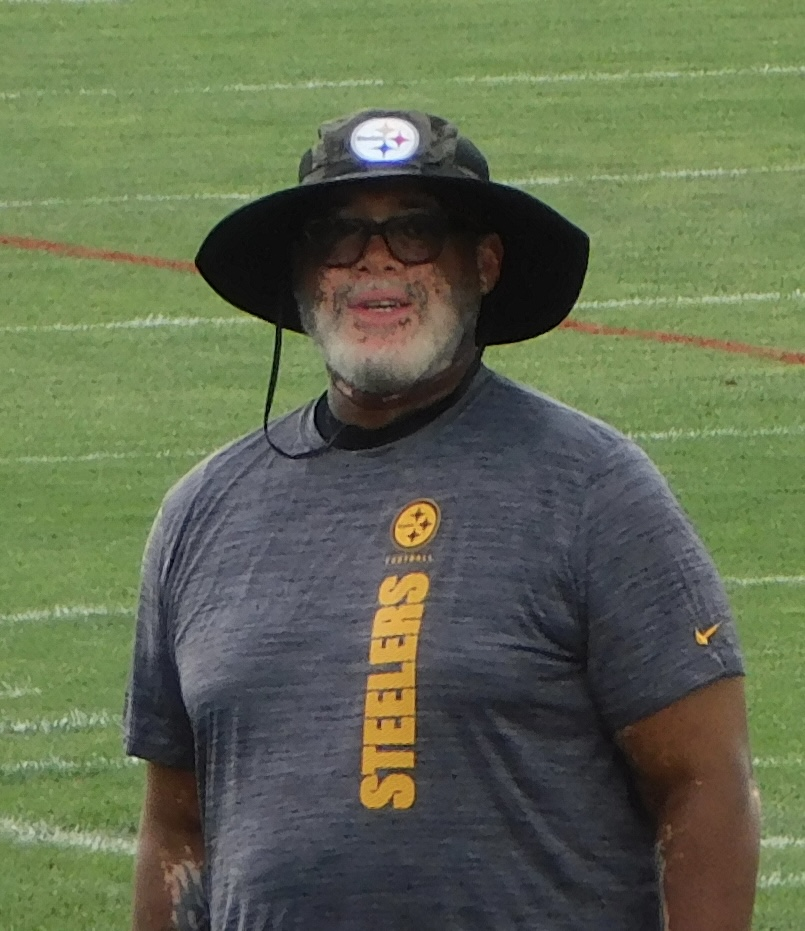
- Dunbar in 2025

New York Jets
- Title: Defensive line coach

Personal information
- Born: May 18, 1967 (age 59); Opelousas, Louisiana, U.S.
- Listed height: 6 ft 4 in (1.93 m)
- Listed weight: 275 lb (125 kg)

Career information
- Position: Defensive end (No. 63, 93)
- High school: Plaisance (LA)
- College: LSU
- NFL draft: 1990: 8th round, 209th overall pick

Career history

Playing
- Pittsburgh Steelers (1990); Orlando Thunder (1992); New Orleans Saints (1992–1993); Arizona Cardinals (1994); Rhein Fire (1995); Arizona Cardinals (1995); Montreal Alouettes (1996)

Coaching
- Nicholls State (1998–1999) Defensive line coach; LSU (2000–2001) Strength and conditioning coach; Oklahoma State (2002–2003) Defensive line coach; Chicago Bears (2004) Defensive line coach; LSU (2005) Defensive line coach; Minnesota Vikings (2006–2011) Defensive line coach; New York Jets (2012–2014) Defensive line coach; Buffalo Bills (2015) Defensive line coach; Alabama (2016–2017) Defensive line coach; Pittsburgh Steelers (2018–2025) Defensive line coach; New York Jets (2026–present) Defensive line coach

Awards and highlights
- FBS national champion (2017); Second-team All-SEC (1989)
- Stats at Pro Football Reference

Karmichael MacKenzie "Karl" Dunbar II (born May 18, 1967) is an American football coach and former player. He is now the defensive line coach for the New York Jets of the National Football League (NFL). He previously coached defensive line for the Buffalo Bills, Pittsburgh Steelers, Minnesota Vikings and Chicago Bears in the NFL.

== Playing career ==
Dunbar was a second-team All-SEC defensive tackle as a senior at LSU.

Pre-draft measurables
Height	Weight	Arm length	Hand span	Bench press
6 ft 4 1/4 in (1.94 m)	283 lb (128 kg)	33 5/8 in (0.85 m)	10 in (0.25 m)	18 reps
All values from NFL Combine

He was selected by the Pittsburgh Steelers in the eighth round, 209th overall, of the 1990 NFL draft. Dunbar was out of football in 1990 and 1991, but returned to play for the Orlando Thunder in the World League of American Football in 1992. Dunbar played three seasons in the NFL for the New Orleans Saints in 1993 and Arizona Cardinals in 1994 and 1995. He also played for the Rhein Fire in NFL Europe in 1995.

== Coaching career ==
Shortly after his playing career ended, Dunbar started coaching at the high school level, first at Opelousas Senior High School in Opelousas, Louisiana in 1996, before moving to Beau Chene High School in Arnaudville, Louisiana in 1997.

Dunbar returned to college football in 1998 and 1999 at Division I-AA Nicholls State University as the defensive line coach. In 2000, he returned to his alma mater, LSU as a member of the strength and conditioning program through 2002. In 2003, he was hired as defensive line coach by Oklahoma State's Les Miles and remained in that role through 2003. While at Oklahoma State, Dunbar tutored Kevin Williams during his breakout senior season and helped him become the first Cowboys defensive lineman to be a 1st-round draft pick since Leslie O'Neal 17 years earlier.

In 2004, Dunbar moved to the NFL after being hired by Lovie Smith to coach the Chicago Bears defensive line. He helped tutor a young and talented line that included rookie 1st-round pick Tommie Harris and 2nd-rounder Tank Johnson. The Bears led the NFL in 3rd-down defense, allowing opponents to convert at a 30.5% rate while ranking 15th in the NFL in pass defense. In 2005, Dunbar returned to his alma mater, LSU, which had just hired Les Miles as their new head coach. During the 2005 season, Dunbar's linemen paved the way for the Tigers defense to rank #5 in the nation in total defense at 276.8 yards per game and 7th in the country in rushing defense at 94.8 yards per game. The defense also allowed only 15.2 points per game, which ranked 8th in the nation, and led the SEC with 39 team sacks.

In 2006, Dunbar returned to the NFL and was hired by the Minnesota Vikings new head coach, Brad Childress. Under his tutelage, the so-called "Williams Wall", consisting of defensive tackle Kevin Williams and nose tackle Pat Williams, led the NFL in defense against the run each year between 2006 and 2008. Over the same period, the Vikings only allowed an average of 70.8 rushing yards per game. He remained with the Vikings through the 2011 season. The New York Jets hired Dunbar on February 13, 2012, to serve as their defensive line coach which he did from 2012 to 2014.

In January 2015, Dunbar was hired as defensive line coach for the Buffalo Bills for the 2015 season, but was fired on March 13, 2016, by head coach Rex Ryan after only one season. In May 2016, he was hired as defensive line coach at the University of Alabama under head coach Nick Saban. Dunbar remained in that role for two seasons through 2017. On February 8, 2018, Dunbar was named defensive line coach of the Pittsburgh Steelers.

On February 4, 2026, Dunbar was hired again by the New York Jets as their defensive line coach under head coach Aaron Glenn.

== Personal life ==
Dunbar has been diagnosed with vitiligo, a condition where the skin loses its pigmentation, usually in patches.
