= Holy Ghost High School =

School in St. Landry Parish, Louisiana, US (1874–1971)

Location
- Opelousas, Louisiana, United States; 30.5401°N 92.0787°W

Information
- Former names: St. Joseph’s Academy for Colored, St. Joseph School, St. Joseph Convent, Holy Ghost School (1921–1924), Holy Ghost Training School (1925–1932)
- School type: Private
- Religious affiliation: Roman Catholic
- Established: 1874
- Founder: Gilbert Raymond, Francis Raymond
- Closed: 1971
- Authority: Roman Catholic Diocese of Lafayette in Louisiana
- Succeeded by: Opelousas Catholic School

Holy Ghost High School (1874–1971) was a private, Black Catholic secondary school founded in Opelousas, Louisiana, in 1874. It was the first Catholic parochial school for Black students in the parish. It also was named St. Joseph’s Academy for Colored, St. Joseph Convent, St. Joseph School, Holy Ghost School, and Holy Ghost Training School.

== History ==
The earliest African American school in the St. Landry Parish was the Grimble Bell School in Washington, Louisiana, founded in the 1830s, and shut down in 1860 by White vigilantes. This was followed by new African American schools formed after the end of the American Civil War, The Freedman’s School and the Peabody School.

The Holy Ghost High School was established in 1874 under the name "St. Joseph’s Academy for Colored" by brothers Fr. Gilbert Raymond and Francis Raymond. The names St. Joseph Convent, and St. Joseph School were also recorded in the early years. It was the first Catholic parochial school for Black students in the parish. The Roman Catholic Diocese of Lafayette in Louisiana opened a Black church called Holy Ghost Church; and in 1921 Fr. James Hyland merged the St. Joseph School with the church to formed the Holy Ghost School. The original school building for St. Joseph was demolished in 1955, and rebuilt the next year in the same location; and by 1959 all remnants of the original wooden structure were removed.

=== Racial integration and closure ===
In July 1970, eighteen families filed a lawsuit in federal court applying for an injunction against the Roman Catholic Diocese of Lafayette, Louisiana and the two parochial school boards in the city of Opelousas. They wanted to end racial segregation in the local Catholic schools for Black and White pupils.

Holy Ghost High School was closed in 1971, and merged along with Academy of the Immaculate Conception (AIC) into Opelousas Catholic School in September 1971. The former Holy Ghost High School campus is now used for an elementary school.

== See also ==
- Rural African American Museum
- Plaisance School
