= St. Landry Parish, Louisiana =

Parish in Louisiana, United States

St. Landry Parish
- Parish
- Parish of St. Landry; Paroisse de Saint-Landry (French)
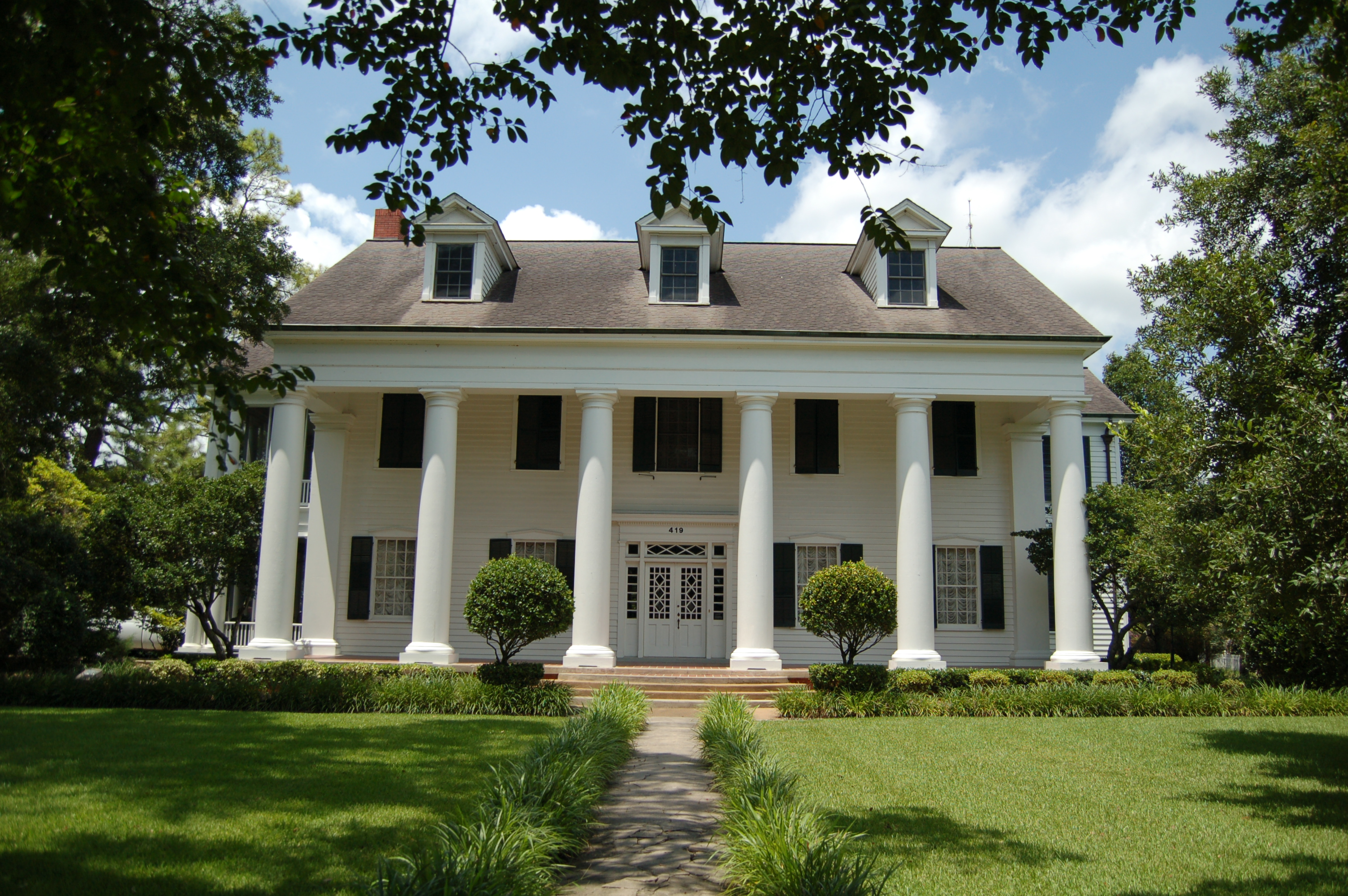
- Edward Benjamin Dubuisson House in Opelousas

- Seal Logo

- Location within the U.S. state of Louisiana
- Coordinates: 30°36′N 92°00′W
- Country: United States
- State: Louisiana
- Founded: 1807
- Named for: St. Landry Catholic Church
- Seat: Opelousas
- Largest city: Opelousas

Area
  - Total: 939 sq mi (2,430 km^{2})
  - Land: 924 sq mi (2,390 km^{2})
  - Water: 15 sq mi (39 km^{2}) 1.6%

Population (2020)
  - Total: 82,540
  - Estimate (2025): 80,765 ▼
  - Density: 89.3/sq mi (34.5/km^{2})
- Time zone: UTC−6 (Central)
  - Summer (DST): UTC−5 (CDT)
- Congressional districts: 3rd, 4th, 5th
- Website: stlandrypg.org

St. Landry Parish (French: Paroisse de Saint-Landry) is a parish located in the U.S. state of Louisiana. As of the 2020 Census, the population was 82,540. The parish seat is Opelousas. The parish was established in 1807.

St. Landry Parish comprises the Opelousas-Eunice, LA Micropolitan Statistical Area (μSA), which is also included in the Lafayette-New Iberia-Opelousas, LA Combined Statistical Area. It is at the heart of Creole and Cajun culture and heritage in Louisiana.

== History ==
=== French and Spanish Territory ===
The land that became St. Landry Parish was inhabited since at least 10,500 B.C., as deduced from excavations of three prehistoric dwelling sites. By the 15th century, the Opelousa Indians settled in the area situated between Atchafalaya River and Sabine River (at the border of Texas-Louisiana). The Opelousa were war-like and preyed on neighbors to defend their own territory.

Tradition says the first European in the Opelousas territory was a French trader named Michel de Birotte. He came in 1690. Nine years later, France named Louisiana as a colony and defined the land occupied by the Opelousa as the Opelousas Territory. The area south of the Opelousas Territory between the Atchafalaya River, the Gulf of Mexico and Bayou Nezpique, occupied by the Atakapas Indians (Eastern Atakapa), was named Atakapas Territory.

French colonial records indicate that early traders Jean Joseph LeKintrek and Joseph Blainpain, who had formed a partnership to trade with the Opelousa Indians, came in the early 1740s. They brought three enslaved Africans, the first to live in the area.

Some Indians sold land to the newcomers. When the Eastern Attakapas Chief Kinemo sold all the land between Vermilion River and Bayou Teche to Frenchman Gabriel Fuselier de la Claire in 1760, however, the angry Opelousa tribe exterminated the Attakapas (Eastern Atakapa).

Although France had to cede Louisiana and its territories to Spain in 1762, the terms of the Treaty of Fontainebleau by which it was ceded were not revealed to the Louisiana colonists until spring of 1764, and Spain did not take full control of the territory until 1766, when the new Spanish governor arrived in the colony. Nevertheless, in 1764, France had established the Opelousas Post slightly north of the contemporary city of Opelousas (near present-day Washington). It was a major trading organization for the developing area. In addition, France had established the Attakapas Post (near the present-day St. Martinville) in the Attakapas Territory in 1765. France gave land grants to soldiers and settlers to encourage development. Most settlers were French immigrants from Acadia.

Under Spanish rule, the Opelousas Post became the center of government for Southwest Louisiana. By 1769 about 100 families were living in Opelousas Post. Between 1780 and 1820, the first settlers were joined by others coming from the Attakapas Territory, from the Pointe Coupée Territory, and east from the Atchafalaya River area. They were joined by immigrants from the French West Indies, who left after Haiti/Saint-Domingue became independent in a slave revolution in 1804. Most of the new settlers were French, Spaniards, French Creoles, Spanish Creoles, Africans and African-Americans.

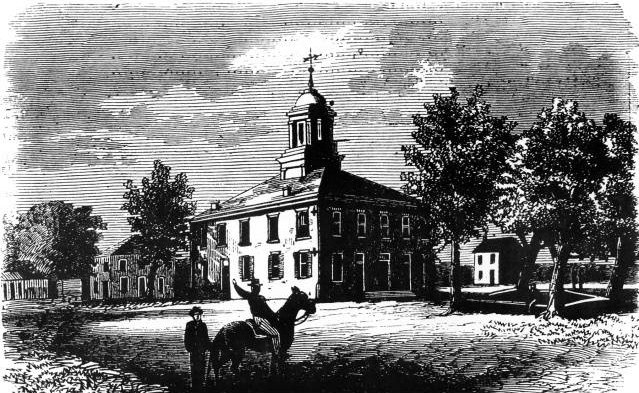
The St. Landry Parish Courthouse in Opelousas during the Civil War

The group from Attakapas Post included many Acadians. These were French who migrated from Nova Scotia in 1763, after their expulsion by the English in the aftermath of France's defeat in the Seven Years' War (known in North America as the French and Indian War). They were led by Jean-Jacques Blaise d'Abbadie. D'Abbadie was Governor of the territory from 1763 to 1765. The French community built St. Landry Catholic Church by 1765, dedicated to St. Landry (Landericus) of Paris, the Bishop of Paris in the 7th century.

On April 10, 1805, after the United States had acquired the Louisiana Purchase from France after it had these territories back since the late 1790s, the post was named the town of Opelousas and became the seat of the County of Opelousas, part of the Territory of Orleans. On April 14, 1807, when the territory was reorganized into “parishes”, Opelousas was designated the seat of Saint Landry Parish, taking the name of the local Catholic church.

=== Purchase by the United States ===
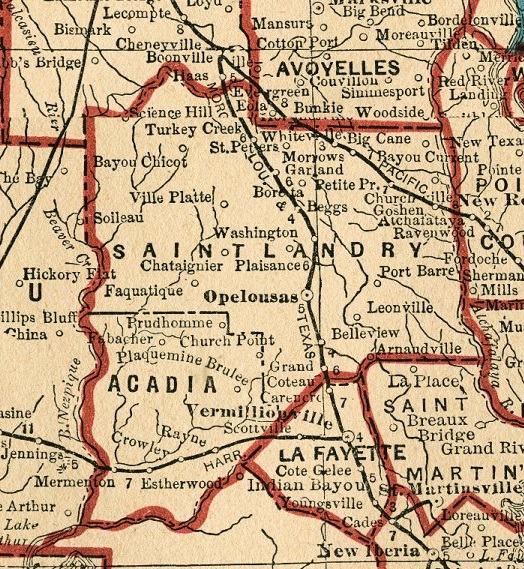
1893 Map of St. Landry

The United States gained control of the territory in 1803 through the Louisiana Purchase. Americans from the South and other parts of the United States began to migrate to the area, marking the arrival of the first large English-speaking population and the introduction of the need for more general use of English.

St. Landry Parish was officially established on April 10, 1805, by a legislative act, becoming the largest parish in the Louisiana state. The new parish was named after the St. Landry Catholic Church located near the Opelousas Post. The parish's boundaries encompassed about half the land of the Opelousas Territory, between the Atchafalaya River and Sabine River, between Rapides Parish and Vernon Parish, and Lafayette and St. Martin Parishes. Since then, the area of the parish has decreased, as six additional parishes have been created from its territory. These include Calcasieu, Acadia, Evangeline, Jeff Davis, Beauregard, and Allen.

In 1821 the second educational institution west of the Mississippi was founded in Grand Coteau. In this community south of Opelousas is the Academy of the Sacred Heart, a private Catholic school founded by the French Creole. community.

The city of Opelousas has been the seat of government for the St. Landry Parish since its formation. After Baton Rouge fell to the Union troops during the Civil War in 1862, Opelousas became the state capital for nine months. The capital was moved again in 1863, this time to Shreveport when Union troops occupied Opelousas.

==== Division of the Parish ====
St. Landry Parish originally consisted of all the territory in the current parishes of Acadia, Evangeline, and St. Landry. Over time, it was separated into these three different parishes.

The southwestern portion of St. Landry was broken off to become Acadia Parish in 1886. A bill was introduced in the Louisiana House of Representatives entitled "An act to create the parish of Nicholls, and to provide for the organization thereof." The title was later changed to read: "An act to create the parish of Acadia." Father Joseph Anthonioz, the first pastor of the Catholic Church at Rayne, is credited with having suggested the name, Acadia Parish. The bill passed the house on June 11, the senate on June 28, and was approved by Governor Samuel D. McEnery on June 30. On October 6, an election was held to affirm the creation of the parish, with 2,516 votes for and 1,521 votes against the creation.

St. Landry was divided again when the northwestern portion was broken away. In June 1908, a bill was passed to create a new parish out of a portion of St. Landry Parish. This new parish became named Evangeline Parish in 1910. Prior to creation of the new parish, Eunice and Ville Platte were in competition for the new parish seat. Ville Platte was selected by voters on April 12, 1909. After the election, Eunice declared it would remain in St. Landry Parish.

=== Opelousas massacre ===
In the aftermath of the ratification of Louisiana's Constitution of 1868 and the Fourteenth Amendment to the United States Constitution, tensions between white Democrats and Black Republicans in St. Landry Parish escalated throughout the summer of 1868. On September 28, white schoolteacher and Republican newspaper editor Emerson Bentley was attacked and beaten by three white supremacists while teaching a classroom of Black children in Opelousas, Louisiana. Rumors of Bentley's death, while unfounded, led both Black Republicans and white supremacist Democrats, including the St. Landry Parish chapter of the Knights of the White Camelia, to threaten violent retribution. In the days following Bentley's subsequent covert flight to New Orleans, the massacre began. Heavily outnumbered, Black citizens were chased, captured, shot, murdered, and lynched during the following weeks. While estimates of casualties vary widely, several sources number the deaths between 200 and 300 black people and several dozen whites, making it the bloodiest massacres of the Reconstruction Era and among the deadliest in American history. Following the massacre, the Republican Party in St. Landry Parish was eliminated for several years.

=== 2019 black church fires ===
During 10 days, three black churches, the St. Mary Baptist Church over 100 years old (March 26, 2019), Greater Union Baptist Church (April 2, 2019), and Mount Pleasant Baptist Church (April 4, 2019) set on fire by a vandal and this incident raised officials concern that the fires started by racist and radical group or person. Finally, police arrested the vandal who was the son of a St. Landry Parish sheriff's deputy. Holden Matthews, 21, has been charged with the arson attack on black churches.

== Geography ==
According to the U.S. Census Bureau, the parish has a total area of 939 square miles (2,430 km^{2}), of which 924 square miles (2,390 km^{2}) is land and 15 square miles (39 km^{2}) (0.6%) is water.

=== Adjacent parishes ===
- Avoyelles Parish (north)
- Pointe Coupee Parish (east)
- St. Martin Parish (southeast)
- Lafayette Parish (south)
- Acadia Parish (southwest)
- Evangeline Parish (west and northwest)

=== National protected areas ===
- Atchafalaya National Wildlife Refuge (part)
- Jean Lafitte National Historical Park and Preserve (part, in Eunice)

=== Major highways ===
- Interstate 49
- U.S. Highway 71
- U.S. Highway 167
- U.S. Highway 190
- Louisiana Highway 10
- Louisiana Highway 13
- Louisiana Highway 29
- Louisiana Highway 31
- Louisiana Highway 35
- Louisiana Highway 91
- Louisiana Highway 93
- Louisiana Highway 103
- Louisiana Highway 104
- Louisiana Highway 105
- Louisiana Highway 107
- Louisiana Highway 178
- Louisiana Highway 182
- Louisiana Highway 343
- Louisiana Highway 356
- Louisiana Highway 358
- Louisiana Highway 359
- Louisiana Highway 360
- Louisiana Highway 361
- Louisiana Highway 363
- Louisiana Highway 367
- Louisiana Highway 686
- Louisiana Highway 740
- Louisiana Highway 741
- Louisiana Highway 742
- Louisiana Highway 743
- Louisiana Highway 744
- Louisiana Highway 745
- Louisiana Highway 746
- Louisiana Highway 748
- Louisiana Highway 749
- Louisiana Highway 751
- Louisiana Highway 752
- Louisiana Highway 754
- Louisiana Highway 755
- Louisiana Highway 757
- Louisiana Highway 758
- Louisiana Highway 759
- Louisiana Highway 760-1
- Louisiana Highway 760-2
- Louisiana Highway 761
- Louisiana Highway 3043
- Louisiana Highway 3173
- Louisiana Highway 3174
- Louisiana Highway 3233
- Louisiana Highway 3253
- Louisiana Highway 3254

== Communities ==
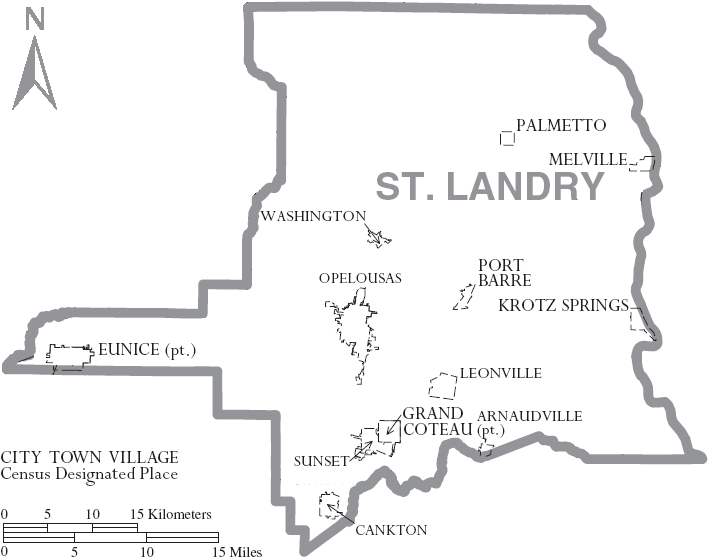
Map of St. Landry Parish, Louisiana With Municipal Labels

=== Cities ===
- Eunice
- Opelousas (parish seat and largest municipality)

=== Towns ===
- Arnaudville
- Grand Coteau
- Krotz Springs
- Leonville
- Melville
- Port Barre
- Sunset
- Washington

=== Villages ===
- Cankton
- Palmetto

=== Unincorporated areas ===
==== Census-designated place ====
- Lawtell
- Lebeau
- Morrow

==== Other communities ====
- Augusta
- Barbreck
- Dumas
- Bat
- Bayou Current
- Bayou Jack
- Beggs
- Big Cane
- Bolden
- Boretta
- Boscoville
- Bristol
- Chiasson
- Courtableau
- Danks
- Darbonne
- Dubuisson
- Elba
- Faubourg
- Frozard
- Garland
- Gibbs
- Goodwood
- Gordon
- Grand Prairie
- Hallf Moon
- Hazelwood
- Immaculata
- Ledoux
- Le Moyen
- Lewisburg
- Macland
- McClure
- Naka
- Neita
- Notelyville
- Nuba
- Pecanière
- Petetin
- Plaisance
- Poplar Grove
- Pointe Claire
- Powell Ridge
- Prairie Ronde
- Rideau Settlement
- Robin
- Rosa
- Sambo
- Savoy
- Shuteston
- Soileau
- St. Louis
- Suna
- Swayze Lake
- Swords
- Veazie
- Veltin
- Waxia
- Whiteville
- Woodside

== Demographics ==
Historical population
Census	Pop.	Note	%±
1830	12,591		—
1840	15,233		21.0%
1850	22,253		46.1%
1860	23,104		3.8%
1870	25,553		10.6%
1880	40,004		56.6%
1890	40,250		0.6%
1900	52,906		31.4%
1910	66,661		26.0%
1920	51,697		−22.4%
1930	60,074		16.2%
1940	71,481		19.0%
1950	78,476		9.8%
1960	81,493		3.8%
1970	80,364		−1.4%
1980	84,128		4.7%
1990	80,331		−4.5%
2000	87,700		9.2%
2010	83,384		−4.9%
2020	82,540		−1.0%
2025 (est.)	80,765	▼	−2.2%
U.S. Decennial Census; 1790-1960 1900-1990; 1990-2000 2010

St. Landry Parish, Louisiana – Racial and ethnic composition Note: the US Census treats Hispanic/Latino as an ethnic category. This table excludes Latinos from the racial categories and assigns them to a separate category. Hispanics/Latinos may be of any race.
Race / Ethnicity (NH = Non-Hispanic)	Pop 1980	Pop 1990	Pop 2000	Pop 2010	Pop 2020	% 1980	% 1990	% 2000	% 2010	% 2020
White alone (NH)	51,120	47,185	49,160	46,025	43,225	60.76%	58.74%	56.05%	55.20%	52.37%
Black or African American alone (NH)	31,535	32,183	36,762	34,295	34,218	37.48%	40.06%	41.92%	41.13%	41.46%
Native American or Alaska Native alone (NH)	35	61	117	263	153	0.04%	0.08%	0.13%	0.32%	0.19%
Asian alone (NH)	156	174	177	314	374	0.19%	0.22%	0.20%	0.38%	0.45%
Native Hawaiian or Pacific Islander alone (NH)	x	x	12	4	12	x	x	0.01%	0.00%	0.01%
Other race alone (NH)	70	89	153	218	282	0.08%	0.11%	0.17%	0.26%	0.34%
Mixed race or Multiracial (NH)	x	x	525	944	2,098	x	x	0.60%	1.13%	2.54%
Hispanic or Latino (any race)	1,212	639	794	1,321	2,178	1.44%	0.80%	0.91%	1.58%	2.64%
Total	84,128	80,331	87,700	83,384	82,540	100.00%	100.00%	100.00%	100.00%	100.00%

As of the 2020 United States census, there were 82,540 people, 30,441 households, and 20,790 families residing in the parish.

== Law enforcement ==
St. Landry Parish Sheriff's Office
- Abbreviation: SLPSO

Jurisdictional structure
- Operations jurisdiction: United States
- General nature: Local civilian police

Operational structure
- Headquarters: Opelousas, Louisiana
- Agency executive: Bobby J. Guidroz, Sheriff

Facilities
- Substations: 5

Website
- http://www.slpsheriff.com/

The St. Landry Parish Sheriff's Office (SLPSO) is the primary law enforcement agency of St. Landry Parish. It falls under the authority of the Sheriff, who is the chief law enforcement officer of the parish. As of 2022 the sheriff of St. Landry Parish is Bobby J. Guidroz.

The office briefly became the subject of national attention in 2015 when its eccentric Crime Stoppers videos, starring public relations officer (later U.S. Representative) Clay Higgins, went viral and were featured on The Tonight Show Starring Jimmy Fallon. Higgins left the department after the videos attracted criticism from the ACLU and Sheriff Guidroz ordered that future videos be "toned down".

== Politics ==
United States presidential election results for St. Landry Parish, Louisiana
Year	Republican		Democratic		Third party(ies)	
Year	No.	%	No.	%	No.	%
1912	101	8.31%	938	77.20%	176	14.49%
1916	117	31.03%	139	36.87%	121	32.10%
1920	942	48.09%	1,017	51.91%	0	0.00%
1924	357	20.86%	1,354	79.14%	0	0.00%
1928	718	17.46%	3,394	82.54%	0	0.00%
1932	297	7.31%	3,766	92.69%	0	0.00%
1936	441	7.25%	5,639	92.75%	0	0.00%
1940	561	8.11%	6,358	91.89%	0	0.00%
1944	784	15.06%	4,423	84.94%	0	0.00%
1948	829	10.70%	1,179	15.22%	5,739	74.08%
1952	5,303	52.69%	4,761	47.31%	0	0.00%
1956	5,141	51.56%	4,435	44.48%	394	3.95%
1960	3,083	15.22%	14,625	72.18%	2,554	12.60%
1964	10,920	48.05%	11,807	51.95%	0	0.00%
1968	3,508	13.90%	9,075	35.95%	12,659	50.15%
1972	12,510	57.01%	7,421	33.82%	2,014	9.18%
1976	9,956	37.94%	15,613	59.49%	674	2.57%
1980	14,940	45.72%	17,125	52.41%	613	1.88%
1984	19,055	51.19%	17,950	48.22%	218	0.59%
1988	15,790	44.53%	19,091	53.84%	576	1.62%
1992	11,882	32.27%	20,383	55.37%	4,550	12.36%
1996	12,273	34.62%	20,636	58.21%	2,544	7.18%
2000	15,449	45.24%	18,067	52.90%	635	1.86%
2004	18,315	49.82%	18,166	49.42%	279	0.76%
2008	21,650	50.95%	20,268	47.70%	575	1.35%
2012	21,475	51.56%	19,668	47.23%	504	1.21%
2016	21,971	54.96%	17,209	43.05%	797	1.99%
2020	23,171	56.30%	17,372	42.21%	611	1.48%
2024	21,812	58.88%	14,833	40.04%	398	1.07%

== Education ==
St. Landry Parish is served by the St. Landry Parish School Board

- Arnaudville Elementary (Grades 5–8)
- Beau Chene High School (Grades 9–12) (unincorporated Arnaudville)
- Cankton Elementary (Grades PK-4) (Cankton)
- Central Middle School (Grades 5–6)
- East Elementary (Grades PK-4)
- Eunice Elementary (Grades PK-4)
- Eunice High School (Grades 9–12)
- Eunice Jr. High School (Grades 7–8)
- Glendale Elementary (Grades PK-4)
- Grand Coteau Elementary (Grades PK-4) (Grand Coteau)
- Grand Prairie Elementary (Grades PK-4) (unincorporated Washington)
- Grolee Elementary (Grades PK-4)
- Highland Elementary (Grades PK-4)
- Krotz Springs Elementary (Grades PK-8)
- Lawtell Elementary (Grades PK-8) (Lawtell)
- Leonville Elementary (Grades PK-8)
- North Central High School (Grades 9–12) (unincorporated Washington)
- Northeast Elementary (Grades PK-6)
- Northwest High School (Grades 9–12) (unincorporated Opelousas)
- Opelousas Jr. High School (Grades 7–8)
- Opelousas Sr. High School (Grades 9–12)
- Palmetto Elementary (Grades PK-4) (Palmetto)
- Park Vista Elementary (Grades PK-6)
- Plaisance Elementary (Grades 5–8) (unincorporated Opelousas)
- Port Barre Elementary (Grades PK-4)
- Port Barre High School (Grades 5–12)
- South Street Elementary (Grades PK-6)
- Sunset Elementary (Grades 5–8)
- Washington Elementary (Grades PK-8)

St. Landry Parish is also served by the Diocese of Lafayette with five schools:

- Academy of the Sacred Heart (Grades PK-12) (Grand Coteau)
- Berchman's Academy of the Sacred Heart (Grades PK-12) (Grand Coteau)
- Opelousas Catholic School (Grades PK-12) (Opelousas)
- St. Edmunds Catholic School (Grades PK-12) (Eunice)
- St. Ignatius Catholic School (Grades PK-8) (Grand Coteau)

Additionally, St. Landry Parish is served by four unaffiliated private schools:

- Good Shephard Montessori School (Grades PK-8) (Port Barre)
- Melville Private School (Grades PK-7) (Melville)
- Opelousas Family Worship School (Grades PK-12) (Opelousas)
- Westminster Christian Academy (Grades PK-12)

St. Landry Parish is served by two institutions of higher education:

- Louisiana State University at Eunice
- South Louisiana Community College service area, T. H. Harris Campus (Opelousas)

== Notable people ==
- Lottie Beebe
- Rod Bernard
- Carl A. Brasseaux
- Gerald Boudreaux
- Lonnie Brooks
- Tony Chachere
- Clifton Chenier
- Cat Doucet
- Gilbert L. Dupré
- E. D. Estilette
- Gordon (slave)
- Curtis J. Guillory
- Elbert Guillory
- Clay Higgins
- Rodney Milburn
- Paul Prudhomme
- Devery Henderson
- Bobby Dunbar

== See also ==
- National Register of Historic Places listings in St. Landry Parish, Louisiana
- Louisiana black church fires
