= Landry of Paris =

French bishop and saint

Saint Landry of Paris
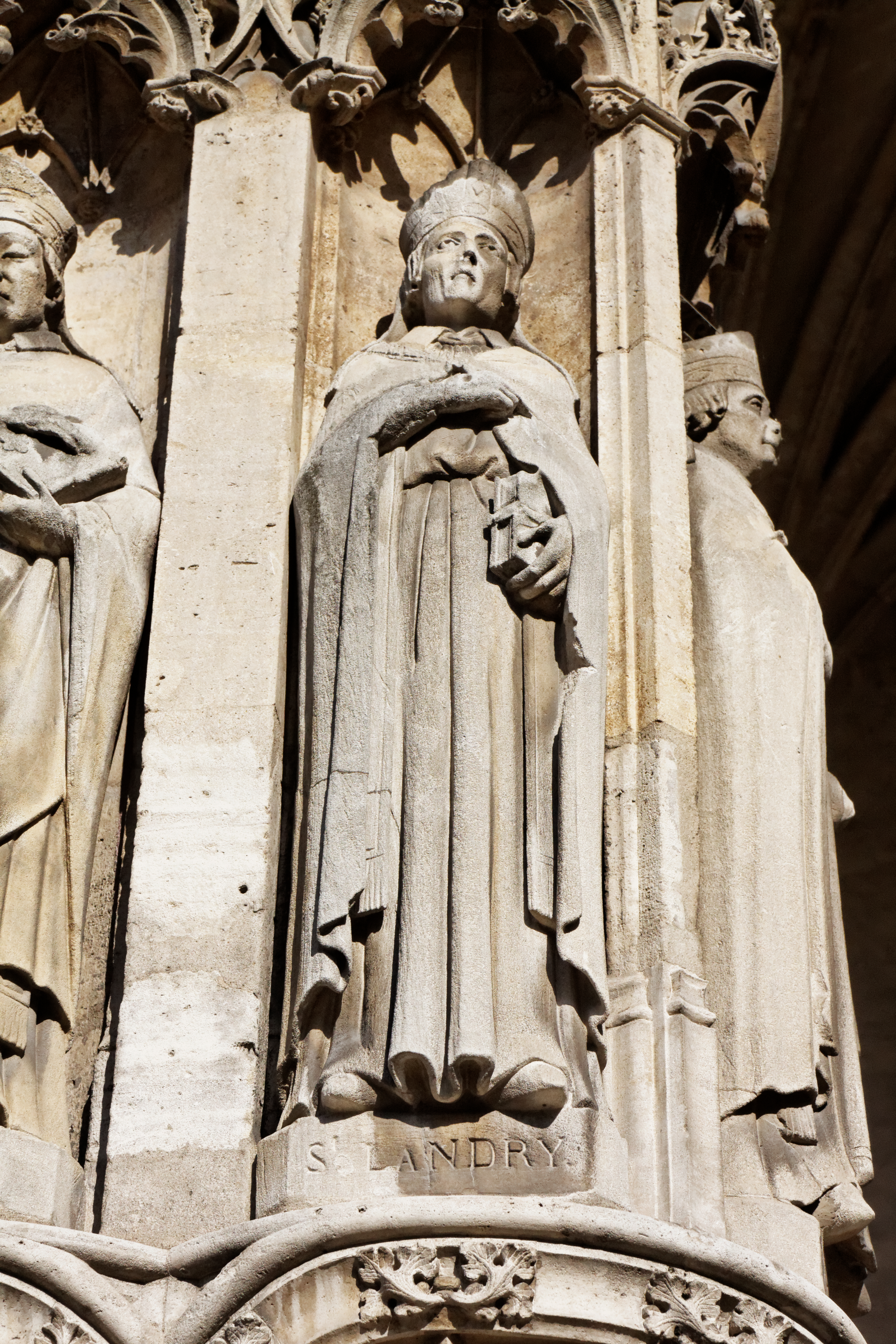
- Statue of St. Landry in Église Saint-Germain-l'Auxerrois, Paris
- Died: c. 661
- Venerated in: Roman Catholic Church; Orthodox Church
- Feast: 10 June

Saint Landry or Landericus of Paris (d. c. 661) was a Bishop of Paris and is canonized as a saint by the Roman Catholic Church and the Orthodox Church. Landry built a hospital dedicated to St. Christopher, which later became the Hôtel-Dieu de Paris. His feast day is 10 June.

== Life ==
Landry was chief clerk of the Royal Chancery. In 650, he succeeded Audobertus as Bishop of Paris. During the famine of 650–51, Bishop Landry sold all of his personal possessions, as well as some of the furniture and sacred vessels of the church, to feed the poor.

He is credited with building the first major hospital in the city, dedicating it to Saint Christopher, (now the Hôtel-Dieu).

In 653, Landry, with 23 other bishops, subscribed to the charter Clovis II gave to Saint-Denis Abbey, exempting it from episcopal jurisdiction. It is believed that he built the original church of Saint-Germain l'Auxerrois, which became the parish church of the kings of France.

He died in 661.

== Veneration ==
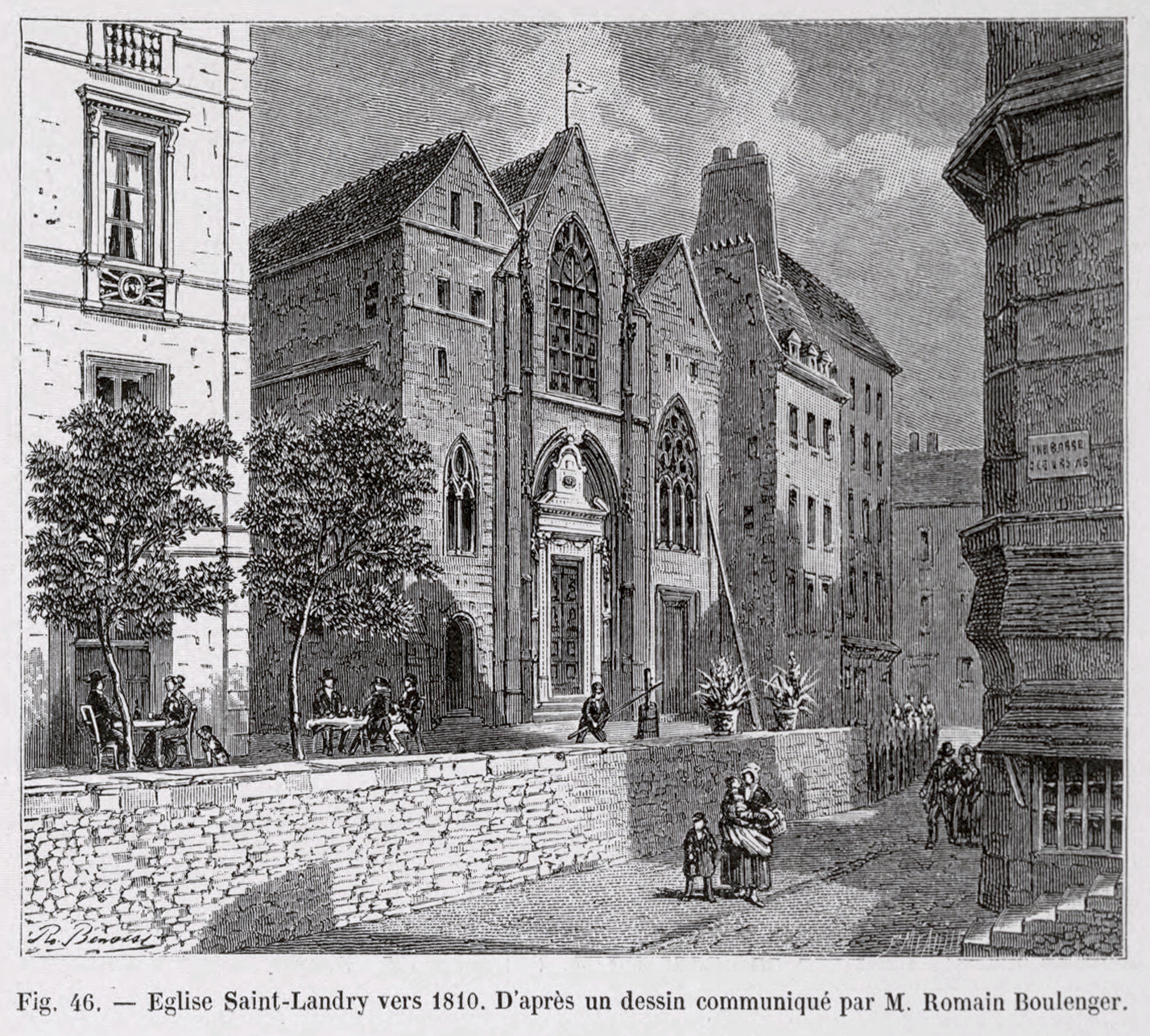
Eglise Saint-Landry, c. 1810

He was buried at the Church of Saint-Germain-l'Auxerrois, where there is a chapel named after him and most of his relics are kept, except for two bones that were given to the parish of Saint-Landry in 1408, which was originally a chapel near the saint's house in which he was accustomed to pray. He is honored with an office in the new Paris Breviary.

His feast day is 10 June.

Miracles were recorded of him. One of them reads:

We have seen and known that a man which men call Raoul Gracard was smitten suddenly, and had the head much great and swollen, and was so red in the face of him that all folk that saw him deemed and held him for a leper. Which man with great haste came to the presence of Saint Landry, and there he confessed him much devoutly, receiving much benignly his penance, and after he came to the sudary of the saint and with great devotion kissed it, and when he had done his offering and vow with much great faith and hope he returned, and unnethe [hardly] he was come to his house when he became as whole as ever he was. Be therefore the name of God praised, who for his good friend Saint Landry he healed so promptly the foresaid patient.

— Jacobus de Voragine, The Golden Legend

St. Landry Catholic Church, in Opelousas, Louisiana is dedicated to Landry of Paris. A statue of Saint Landry stands behind the altar, and a stained glass window with his image at the southwest corner of the church. The civil parish of St. Landry, located in south Louisiana and of which Opelousas is the seat, is named after the church.

Port St-Landry was Paris' first dock.
