= Le Moyen, Louisiana =

- Unincorporated community
- Location within Louisiana Location within the United States
- Coordinates: 30°47′08″N 92°02′25″W
- Country: United States
- State: Louisiana
- Parish: St. Landry
- Elevation: 39 ft (12 m)
- Time zone: UTC-6 (Central (CST))
  - Summer (DST): UTC-5 (CDT)
- ZIP code: 71356
- Area code: 337
- GNIS feature ID: 1627460

Le Moyen (also LeMoyen, Lemoyen) is an unincorporated community in St. Landry Parish, Louisiana, United States. Its ZIP Code is 71356.
