= Mary Alice Fontenot =

American writer

Mary Alice Fontenot (April 16, 1910 – May 12, 2003), born in Eunice, Louisiana, was a noted author of regional children's books, best known for the Clovis Crawfish series published by Pelican Publishing, a collection of eighteen books featuring animals from the Louisiana bayou. The books are written in English and sprinkled with Cajun words, with an explanation of their pronunciation and meaning (several titles are also published in complete French versions).

Fontenot's first Clovis Crawfish book was published in 1961, with several more following in the 1960s and 1970s; the series shifted into high gear with multiple volumes published from the 1980s up until the time of her death in 2003 at age 93. She authored several children's books outside the Clovis Crawfish series, including "Mardi Gras in the Country" which tells the story of how Mardi Gras is celebrated in rural Acadian areas as opposed to the large, glamorous New Orleans carnivals, and "Star Seed," a telling of Christ's birth. Fontenot was also the author of several regional histories and biographies and the co-author of a cookbook, "Cajun Accent." Her final book, "Clovis Crawfish and Silvie Sulphur," was published posthumously in 2004.

Fontenot worked over three decades as a journalist beginning in the early 1940s, writing features and book reviews for several Louisiana and Mississippi newspapers, including a period as women's news editor for one paper. She also hosted a radio show on KSIG-AM in Crowley, Louisiana and taught kindergarten classes. In her senior years, Fontenot concentrated on her career as a book author and was quite prolific penning new volumes from her seventies into her nineties.

Fontenot's awards include the Acadiana Arts Council Lifetime Achievement Award, the Louisiana State Library Award, and in 2003, she was named a Louisiana Legend by Louisiana Public Broadcasting.

== Books ==
Clovis Crawfish Series

- Clovis Crawfish and His Friends (1962)
- Clovis Crawfish And The Big Betail (1963)
- Clovis Crawfish and the Singing Cigales (1965)
- Clovis Crawfish and Petit Papillon (1966)
- Clovis Crawfish and the Spinning Spider (1968)
- Clovis Crawfish And The Curious Crapaud (1970)
- Clovis Crawfish and Michelle Mantis (1976)
- Clovis Crawfish and the Orphan Zo-Zo (1983)
- Clovis Crawfish And Simeon Suce-Fleur (1990)
- Clovis Crawfish And Bertiles Bon Voyage (1991)
- Clovis Crawfish and Etienne Escargot (1992)
- Clovis Crawfish And Batiste Bete Puante (1993)
- Clovis Crawfish and Bidon Box Turtle (1996)
- Clovis Crawfish and Paillasse Poule D'Eau (1997)
- Clovis Crawfish and Fedora Field Mouse (1998)
- Clovis Crawfish and Raoul Raccoon (2001)
- Clovis Crawfish and Echo Gecko (2003)
- Clovis Crawfish and Silvie Sulphur (2004)
- Clovis Crawfish and the Twin Sister (2007)

French editions

- Clovis Ecrevisse Et Ses Amis With Clovis Ecrevisse Et Simeon Sucefleur
- Clovis Ecrevisse Et Les Cigales Qui Chantent With Clovis Ecrevisse Et Petit Papillon
- Clovis Ecrevisse Et Laraignee Qui File
- Clovis Ecrevisse Et Charlotte Cheval De Diable With Clovis Ecrevisse Et Etienne Escargot
- Clovis Ecrevisse Et La Grosse Betail With Clovisecrevisse Et Loiseau Orphelin
- Clovis Ecrevisse Et Batiste Bete Puante With Clovis Ecrevisse Et Le Bon Voyage A Pauline
- Clovis Crawfish And Paillasse Poule Deau
- Clovis Crawfish Et Ses AmisClovis Crawfish And Friends
- Clovis Ecrevisse Et Loiseau Orphelin-French
- Clovis Ecrevisse Et Laraignee Qui File
- Clovis Ecrevisse Et Paillasse Poule Deau

Additional Children's Books

- Star Seed: A Story of the First Christmas (1986)
- Mardi Gras in the Country (1994)
- Tah-Tye, The Last Possum in the Pouch (1996)

Various Books on Louisiana History

- The Ghost of Bayou Tigre (1965)
- The Cat and St. Landry: A Biography of Sheriff D.J. "Cat" Doucet of St. Landry Parish, La. (1936–1940; 1952–1968) (1972)
- Acadia Parish, Louisiana (1976, 1997)
- Acadia Parish: A History to 1920 (1979, 1997)
- The Louisiana Experience (1983)
- The Tensas Story (1987)
- The Gentle Shepard: A Memoir of Bishop Jules B. Jeanmard (1998)
- Cajun Accent, A Cookbook
