= St. Landry Parish School Board =

School district in Louisiana, United States

St. Landry Parish School District
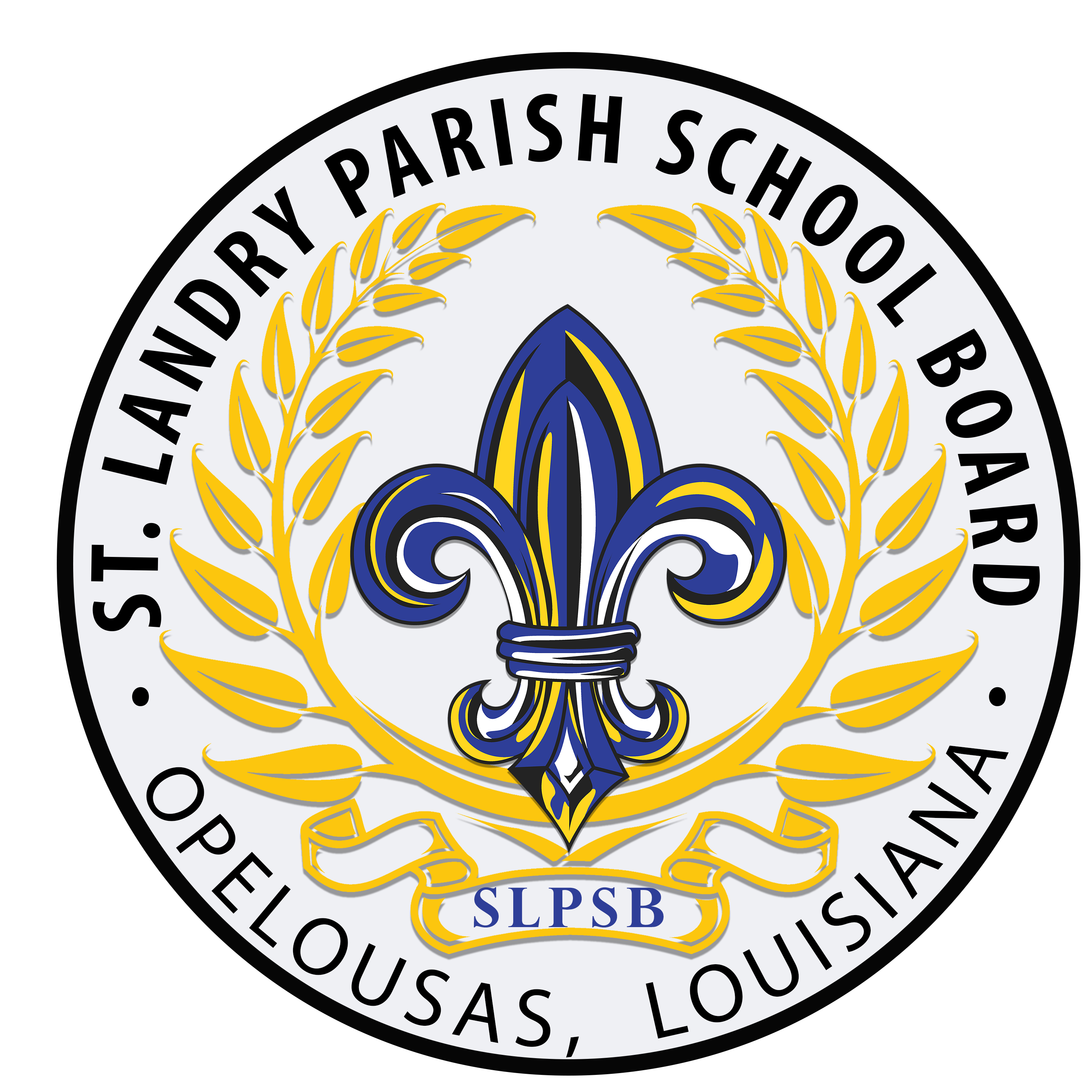

Location
- 1013 E Creswell Ln; Opelousas, LA 70571 United States
- Coordinates: 30.5200°N 92.0736°W

District information
- Type: Public
- Grades: Pre-K–12
- Superintendent: Milton Batiste III
- School board: Anthony Standberry (Dist 1); Joyce Haynes (Dist 2); John Miller (Dist 3); Raymond Cassimere (Dist 4); Denise Oliney Rose (Dist 5); Donnie Perron (Dist 6) "Josh" Boudreaux (Dist 7); Kyle C. Boss (Dist 8); Randy Wagley (Dist 9); Hazel McCrea-Sias (Dist 10); Myron Guillory (Dist 11); Albert Hayes, Jr. (Dist 12); Mary Ellen Donatto (Dist 13)
- Schools: 36 (2018-2019)
- NCES District ID: 2201560

Students and staff
- Students: 14,320 (2018)

Other information
- Website: www.slpsb.org

The St. Landry Parish School Board is located in Opelousas, Louisiana. The St. Landry Parish School District is rated a C district. Mr. Milton Batiste, III is the superintendent of the St. Landry Parish School System.

== Schools ==
The St. Landry Parish School Board operates 36 public schools, including 23 elementary schools, four middle schools, seven high schools, and four alternative programs.

=== Elementary schools ===
- Arnaudville Elementary School
- Cankton Elementary
- Central Middle School
- East Elementary
- Glendale Elementary
- Grand Coteau Elementary
- Grand Prairie Elementary
- Grolee Elementary School
- Highland Elementary School
- Krotz Springs Elementary School
- Lawtell Elementary School
- Leonville Elementary School
- North Elementary School
- Northeast Elementary School
- Palmetto Elementary School
- Park Vista Elementary School
- Port Barre Elementary School
- Washington Elementary School

=== Junior high schools ===
- Eunice Jr. High School
- Opelousas Jr. High School
- Sunset Middle School
- Plaisance Middle School (Grade 5-8)

=== High schools ===
- Beau Chene High School
- Eunice High School
- North Central High School
- Northwest High School
- Opelousas Senior High School
- Port Barre High School
- Magnet Academy for Cultural Arts (MACA)

=== Alternative programs ===
- Eunice Career and Technical Center
- St. Landry Accelerated Transition School (SLATS)
- Center for Academic Programs (CAPS)
- Washington Career and Technical Education Center

== In The News ==
In April 2024, the St. Landry Parish School board was named as a defendant in a Lawsuit filed by the football coach of Opelousas High School. The lawsuit comes on the heals of an LHSAAdecision to revoke a football state championship title earlier in the year.

== Superintendent ==
On May 4, 1878, the Board of Public School Directors of St. Landry Parish published the duties regulating the Parish Superintendent of Education, "an office lately instituted by our Parish Board." The position of Superintendent of Schools for St. Landry Parish was created in 1878.
