= Cat Doucet =

American sheriff (1899–1975)

Daly Joseph "Cat" Doucet Sr.
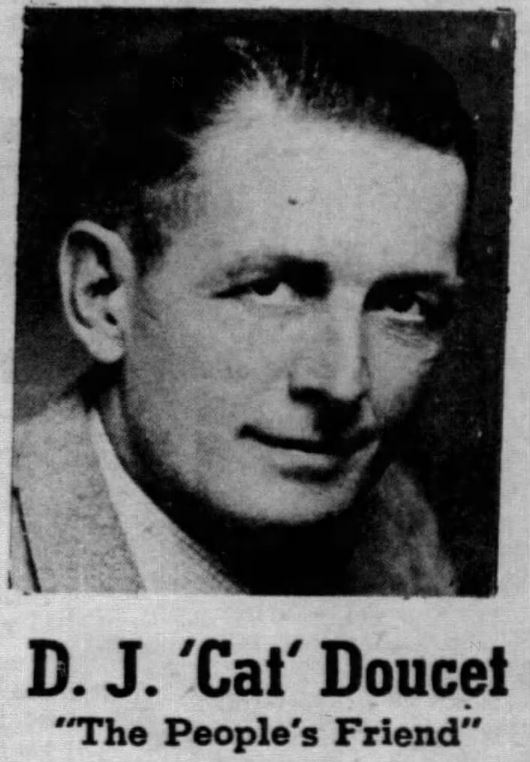
- Doucet in 1948

Sheriff of St. Landry Parish, Louisiana
- In office 1936–1940
- In office 1952–1968

Personal details
- Born: November 8, 1899 Grand Prairie, Louisiana, U.S.
- Died: February 9, 1975 (aged 75) New Orleans, Louisiana, U.S.
- Party: Democratic Party
- Spouse: Anna Dorcey Doucet (m. 1919-1965, her death)
- Children: 6

Daly Joseph "Cat" Doucet Sr. (November 8, 1899 – February 9, 1975) was an American politician who served as Sheriff of St. Landry Parish, Louisiana from 1936 to 1940 and 1952 to 1968.

== Biography ==
Doucet was born in Grand Prairie, Louisiana. In his career, he was a political ally of Louisiana politician Huey P. Long – campaigning for him and hosting him at his home when Long was in the area. Doucet was elected sheriff in 1936, losing re-election in 1940. After leaving office, Doucet was indicted for embezzling $3000 in public funds with seven of his former deputies testifying against him.

Doucet was later re-elected in 1952 for sixteen years, his civil rights endorsement and anti-segregation stance giving Doucet enough African-American support to combat his electoral rivalry. He was investigated by the FBI for his role in the presence of gambling and prostitution in his local parish, and was once indicted for embezzlement. It is said that his support for African Americans' voting rights was purely because they valued his allowance of illegal activity in St. Landry Parish. When segregationists implied that he legitimately sympathized with African Americans, he controversially replied, "I'm not a nigger lover."

At the end of April 1960, Doucet was part of a group of dignitaries to receive French President Charles de Gaulle during is visit to Louisiana. Doucet commented that de Gaulle's “French isn’t too bad.”

Doucet died at his daughter's house in New Orleans on February 9, 1975. His funeral was held at St. Landry Catholic Church.

== Personal life ==
Doucet had six children with his wife Anna Dorcey.

== Legacy ==
He has been described as a colorful figure for his time. Much of his life and career were recorded in The Cat and St. Landry, a biography written in 1972 by Mary Alice Fontenot and Vincent Riehl. Doucet was inducted into the Louisiana Political Museum and Hall of Fame in 1999.

== Bibliography ==
- The Cat and St. Landry (1972) by Mary Alice Fontenot and Vincent Riehl
