= Daniel Baldridge =

American football player (born 1985)

No. 76, 70
- Position: Offensive tackle

Personal information
- Born: October 21, 1985 (age 41); Opelousas, Louisiana, U.S.
- Listed height: 6 ft 8 in (2.03 m)
- Listed weight: 308 lb (140 kg)

Career information
- High school: Opelousas
- College: Marshall (2005–2009)
- NFL draft: 2010: undrafted

Career history
- Jacksonville Jaguars (2010–2012); Tennessee Titans (2012); Cleveland Gladiators (2015)*
- * Offseason or practice squad member only

Awards and highlights
- Second-team All-C-USA (2009)

Career NFL statistics
- Games played: 2
- Stats at Pro Football Reference

Daniel Matthew Baldridge (born October 21, 1985), is an American former professional football player who was an offensive tackle in the National Football League (NFL). He was signed by the Jacksonville Jaguars as an undrafted free agent in 2010. He played college football for the Marshall Thundering Herd.

== Early life ==
Baldridge did not play football until his senior year at Opelousas High School.

In the class of 2005, Baldridge was rated a two-star recruit by Rivals.com. He was also rated both a two-star recruit and the No. 144 offensive tackle in the country on 247Sports.com's composite rating, which takes into account the ratings of all the other major recruiting services in the country.

Baldridge committed to Marshall on February 2, 2005. He also received an offer from UCLA.

== College career ==
Baldridge started 24 games for the Marshall Thundering Herd during his college career. He started all thirteen games during his senior year and earned second-team All-Conference USA honors. He was redshirted in 2005.

== Professional career ==
=== Jacksonville Jaguars ===
Baldridge was signed as an undrafted free agent by the Jacksonville Jaguars after the 2010 NFL draft. He was cut on September 4, 2010, but was signed to the Jaguars' practice squad on September 5, 2010.

On September 1, 2012, Baldridge was placed on the team's practice squad. He was activated on September 15, 2012, and played in the team's Week 3 win over the Indianapolis Colts. He was released on October 5, 2012, but re-signed to the practice squad on October 9.

=== Tennessee Titans ===
He was signed by the Tennessee Titans off of the Jaguars' practice squad on December 4, 2012.

=== Cleveland Gladiators ===
He was assigned by the Cleveland Gladiators of the Arena Football League on January 9, 2015. He was placed on reassignment on March 8, 2015.

== Personal life ==
Baldridge resides in Opelousas, Louisiana, where he grew up and attended Opelousas High School. His current career is in refinery and chemical plant mechanical inspection. He is an avid cook, and frequently participates in fund raising events such as gumbo cook-offs.
