= Magnet Academy for Cultural Arts =

Coordinates: 30°31′22″N 92°4′21″W

Magnet Academy for Cultural Arts (MACA) is a public magnet high school, with focus on cultural arts, located at 1100 E. Leo Street in Opelousas, Louisiana, United States.

== History ==
The campus for MACA, formerly housed East Junior High School; and the earlier J.S. Clark High School (1953–1970), a segregated public high school for African American students.

The Magnet Academy for Cultural Arts started in the 2005–2006 school year, with only 7th, 8th and 9th grades, with a new grade being added every year until the 2008–2009 school year, when 12th grade was reached. The first graduating class graduated in May 2009. The principal since the 2012–2013 school year is Karen Olivier. In the 2009–2010 school year MACA had its first sports league, "intramural sports". The school has six talent areas: art, dance, band, vocals, theater, and creative writing.
