= Tony Chachere =

American businessman and chef

- Born: Anthony Chachere; June 14, 1905; Opelousas, Louisiana, US
- Died: March 19, 1995 (aged 89); Opelousas, Louisiana, US
- Occupations: Businessman, chef

Anthony Chachere (/ˈsæʃəri/ SASH-ər-ee; June 14, 1905 – March 19, 1995) was an American businessman and chef best known as the founder of his eponymous Tony Chachere's Creole Foods seasonings and ingredients brand and its original product, Tony Chachere's Original Creole Seasoning. He was the first inductee into the Louisiana Chefs Hall of Fame, receiving that honor in 1995, just one week before his death.

== Early and personal life ==
Chachere was born on June 14, 1905, in Opelousas, Louisiana, to Tilghman George and Nina Celestine, the fifth of seven children. He died there on March 19, 1995.

Chachere was married to Patricia (née Kerr) and had four children.

== Career ==
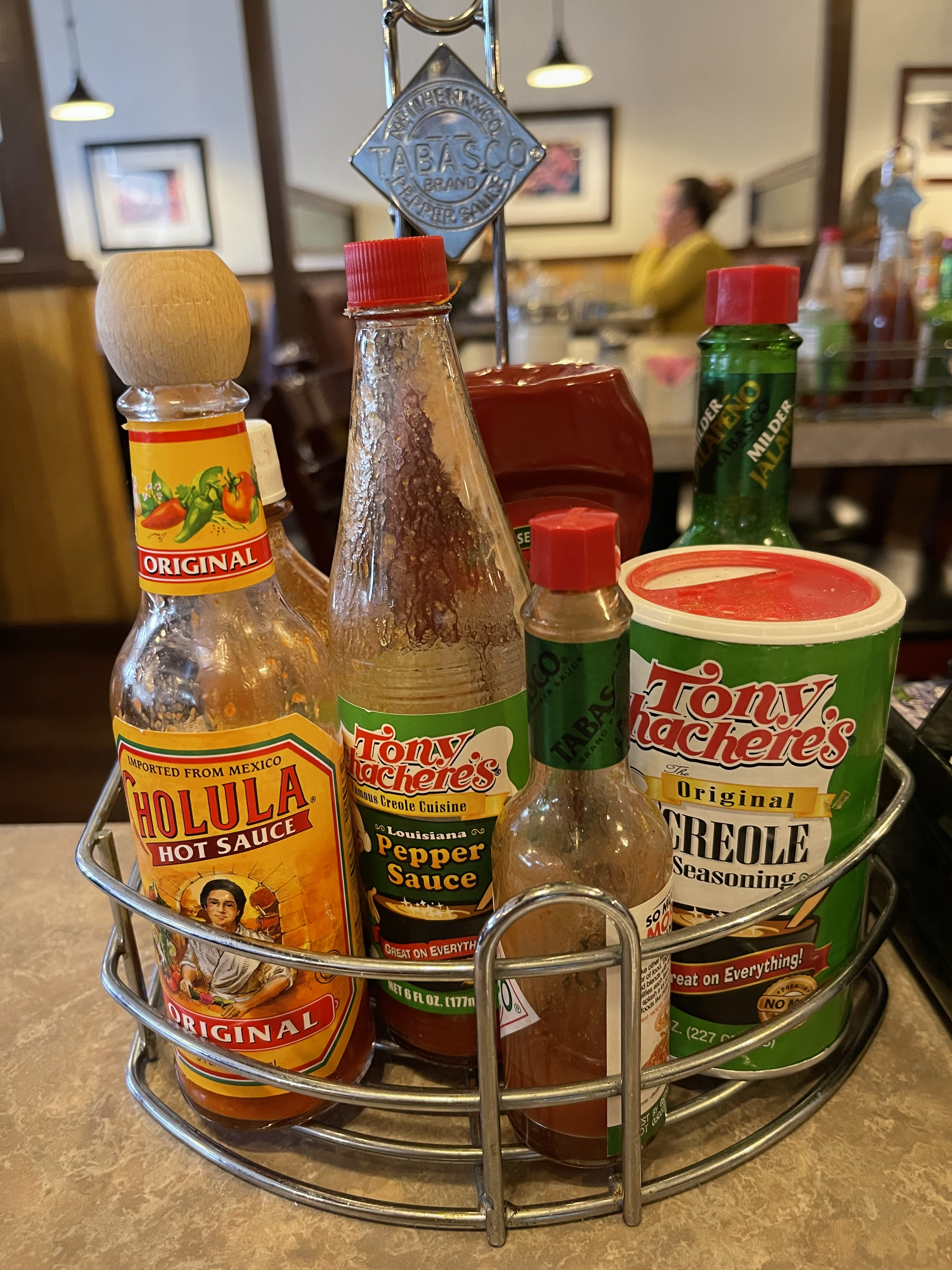
Chachere's seasoning and sauce at a restaurant in Lompoc, California.

During the Great Depression, he worked as a traveling drug salesman. At age 30, he started his own drug wholesale business, the Louisiana Drug Company (LADCO), with $100. At times working from his garage, he created his own elixirs, including Mamou Cough Syrup and Bon Soir Bug insect repellent. LADCO eventually became a million-dollar business, and Chachere retired for the first time at age 50.

Two years later, Chachere began working for the Equitable Life Insurance Society. He remained there for 13 years, making the Millionaires Club every year and being honored in the company's Hall of Fame. Chachere retired for the second time at age 65.

=== Cooking and writing ===
In 1972, drawing upon a life of cooking for friends and family, Chachere published his first cookbook, Cajun Country Cookbook, which included the recipe that became his Original Creole Seasoning. Positive public response to the book led him to start Tony Chachere's Creole Foods.

At age 76, Chachere formally retired from the food business, but continued developing recipes and new food products. He is said to have been a vivid storyteller, avid cook and always full of life. Chachere frequently autographed his books with laissez les bons temps rouler (let the good times roll). In 1995, he died just a few months shy of his 90th birthday.

Tony Chachere's Creole Foods is now owned by Chachere's remaining descendants and is run by Don Chachere, his grandson. It continues to offer a variety of cookbooks, seasoning blends, dinner mixes, marinades, sauces, batters, and frozen items.
