= Devery Henderson =

American football player (born 1982)

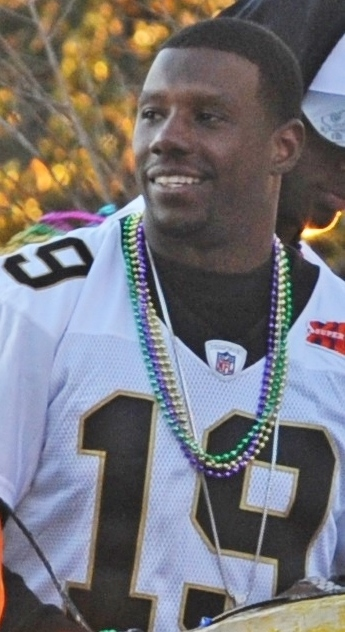
- Henderson at the Saints Super Bowl XLIV victory parade in New Orleans

No. 19
- Position: Wide receiver

Personal information
- Born: March 26, 1982 (age 44); Opelousas, Louisiana, U.S.
- Listed height: 5 ft 11 in (1.80 m)
- Listed weight: 200 lb (91 kg)

Career information
- High school: Opelousas
- College: LSU (2000–2003)
- NFL draft: 2004: 2nd round, 50th overall pick

Career history
- New Orleans Saints (2004–2012); Washington Redskins (2013)*
- * Offseason or practice squad member only

Awards and highlights
- Super Bowl champion (XLIV); New Orleans Saints Hall of Fame; BCS national champion (2003); First-team All-SEC (2003)

Career NFL statistics
- Receptions: 245
- Receiving yards: 4,377
- Receiving average: 17.9
- Receiving touchdowns: 20
- Rushing yards: 119
- Rushing touchdowns: 1
- Stats at Pro Football Reference

Devery Vaughn Henderson Jr. (born March 26, 1982) is an American former professional football player who was a wide receiver for nine seasons with the New Orleans Saints of the National Football League (NFL). The Louisiana-born Henderson played for the LSU Tigers, who won the 2004 BCS National Championship Game for the 2003 NCAA Division I-A football season. A few months later, the Saints selected Henderson in the second round of the 2004 NFL draft.

Henderson was part of the Saints' 2009 team that won Super Bowl XLIV against the Indianapolis Colts.

== Early life ==
Henderson grew up in Opelousas, Louisiana, and attended Opelousas High School where he was a star for their highly rated track team. He attended LSU on a track and football scholarship.

== College career ==
The highlight of his career at LSU came on November 9, 2002. Henderson caught the famed "Bluegrass Miracle" deep pass from Marcus Randall to help defeat the Kentucky Wildcats, 33–30. This play was also especially noteworthy as the Kentucky coach Guy Morriss had already received the famed "Gatorade shower" prior to the touchdown. The "Bluegrass Miracle" also won an ESPY award the following year for "Best Play." Henderson accepted the award on behalf of the LSU Tigers.

In 2002, Henderson recorded 23 catches for 447 yards with eight touchdowns, carving out a role as a deep threat. Henderson was part of LSU's 2003 BCS National Championship team during his senior season. That year, he was named on the All-SEC Second-team after racking up 11 touchdowns and 861 yards on 53 receptions.

Henderson was also a track star at Louisiana State University, where he was member of LSU's national champion track, member of LSU's NCAA-qualifying 4 × 100 metres relay team and also a member of LSU's 2001 National Champion Indoor Track and Field team. In his sophomore season, he ran the second-fastest 60-meter time in school history, with a time of 6.72 seconds.

== Professional career ==
Pre-draft measurables
Height	Weight	Arm length	Hand span	40-yard dash	20-yard shuttle	Three-cone drill	Vertical jump
5 ft 11 1/2 in (1.82 m)	198 lb (90 kg)	30 in (0.76 m)	8 7/8 in (0.23 m)	4.36 s	4.21 s	6.74 s	35.5 in (0.90 m)
All values from LSU Pro Day.

=== New Orleans Saints ===
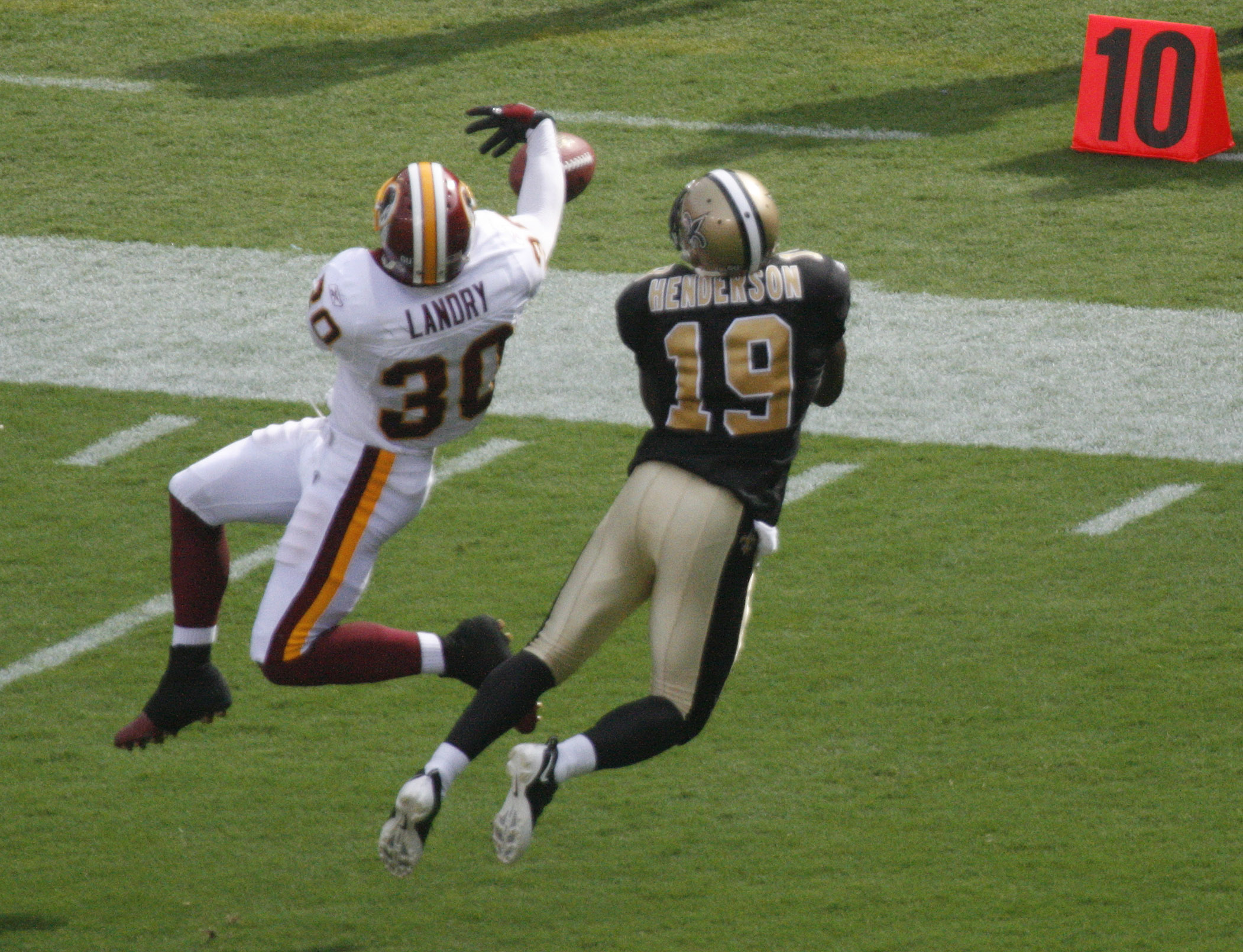
Henderson with the New Orleans Saints

Henderson was drafted by the New Orleans Saints in the second round with the 50th pick of the 2004 NFL draft.

Henderson benefited from the regime change in New Orleans after his rookie year, as the 2006 season saw Aaron Brooks give way to Drew Brees at quarterback and Sean Payton replace Jim Haslett as head coach. His statistics improved over those of his rookie season — most notably in receptions (22 vs. 32), total yards (343 vs. 745), yards per catch (15.6 vs. 23.3), longest catch (66 vs. 76), and touchdowns (3 vs. 5).

On November 5, 2006, in a game against the Tampa Bay Buccaneers, he caught three passes for 111 yards and two touchdowns. Henderson had 158 receiving yards on 4 catches, including a 76-yard touchdown, against the Atlanta Falcons on November 26, 2006. On December 10, 2006, Henderson caught two passes from Drew Brees for 92 yards and one touchdown, as the Saints defeated the Dallas Cowboys 42–17 on NBC Sunday Night Football.

On March 2, 2009, Henderson re-signed with the Saints. The Saints went to the Super Bowl that year and Henderson had seven catches for 63 yards en route to the Saints defeating the Indianapolis Colts in Super Bowl XLIV.

On September 18, 2011, Henderson had a touchdown catch for 79 yards. On October 8, 2012, he caught a touchdown pass from Drew Brees to break Johnny Unitas's record of 47 straight games with a touchdown pass in the Saints' 31–24 win over the San Diego Chargers.

As of week 17 of the 2012 NFL season, Henderson averaged nearly 18 yards per catch (17.9625), which was the highest among all active receivers for yards per catch with 200+ catches.

After the Saints' 2012 season, Henderson became a free agent.

=== Washington Redskins ===
Henderson signed with the Washington Redskins on June 12, 2013. He was released by the team on August 14, 2013.

== NFL career statistics ==
Year	Team	GP	Rec	Yds	Avg	Lng	TD
2005	NO	15	22	343	15.6	66	3
2006	NO	13	32	745	23.3	76	5
2007	NO	16	20	409	20.5	54	3
2008	NO	16	32	793	24.8	84	3
2009	NO	16	51	804	15.8	75	2
2010	NO	16	34	464	13.6	57	1
2011	NO	16	32	503	15.7	79	2
2012	NO	15	22	316	14.4	41	1
Career		123	245	4,377	17.9	84	20
