= Opelousas Catholic School =

Private school in Opelousas, Louisiana, United States

Location
- 428 East Prudhomme Lane; Opelousas, St. Landry Parish, Louisiana 70570; United States; 30°32′35″N 92°4′37″W

Information
- Type: Private, Coeducational
- Motto: “Living Lives of Grace through Faith and Good Works”
- Religious affiliation: Roman Catholic
- Patron saints: Mary, Mother of God
- Established: 1855
- Founder: Rev. Gilbert Raymond
- Chairperson: Gregg Doucet
- Dean: Steven Dye
- Rector: Rev. Fr. Charles W. “Billy” Massie
- Principal: Matt Citron
- Grades: PK–12
- Gender: Co-Educational
- Language: English & French
- Classrooms: 200+
- Campus size: 27 acres
- Colors: Purple and White
- Slogan: "The sky is the limit"
- Team name: Vikings
- Accreditation: Southern Association of Colleges and Schools
- USNWR ranking: 4-5 stars
- Website: www.ocsvikings.com

Opelousas Catholic School is a private, Catholic school in Opelousas, Louisiana. Located in the Roman Catholic Diocese of Lafayette, the school offers education from pre-kindergarten 3/4 through 12th grade.

== History ==
Founded in 1855 as St. Mary’s Academy for Boys. In 1856, the Academy of the Immaculate Conception for Girls was established and staffed by Sisters Marianites of Holy Cross.

Holy Ghost High School, a segregated African American Catholic school was closed in 1971, and merged, along with the Academy of the Immaculate Conception (AIC), a segregated White Catholic school, into Opelousas Catholic School in September 1971.

== Athletics ==
Opelousas Catholic athletics competes in the LHSAA.

=== Championships ===
Football Championships

- State Championship: 1974

== Notable alumni ==
- Keon Coleman, NFL wide receiver for the Buffalo Bills
