= Beau Chene High School =

Beau Chêne High School
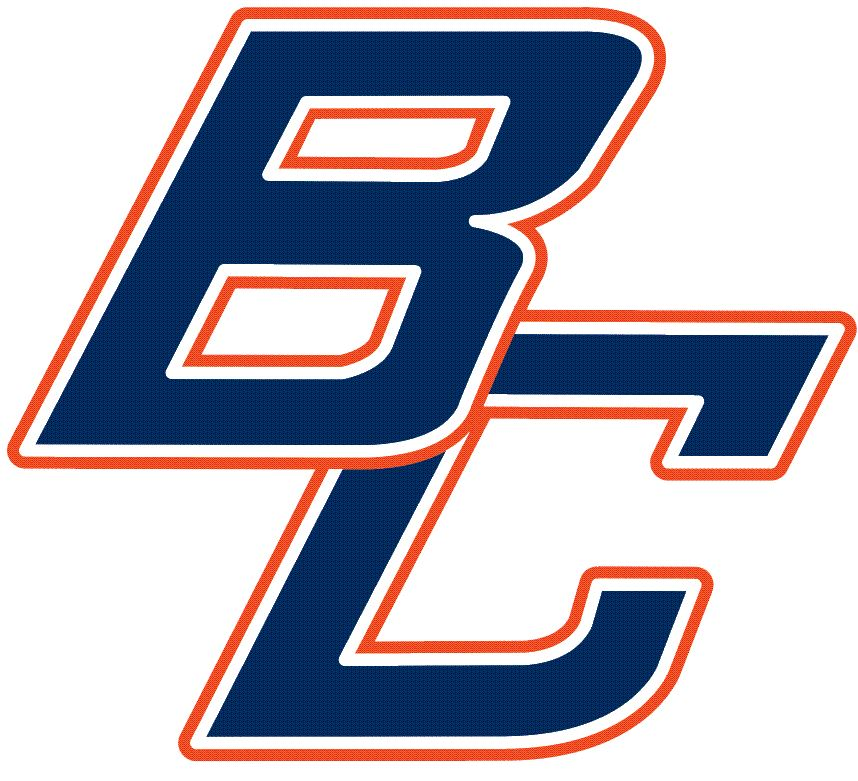

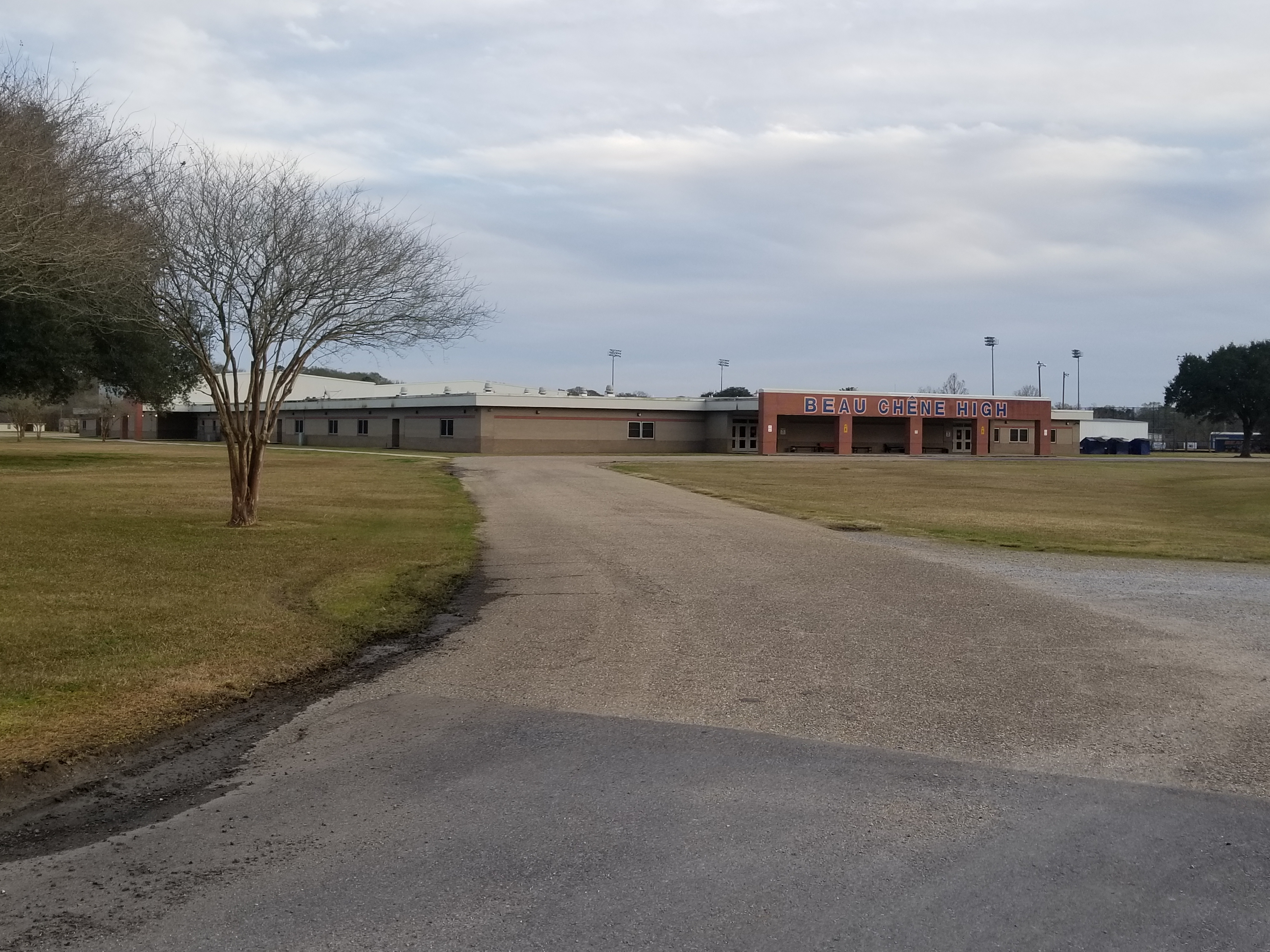

Location
- 7076 Highway 93; Arnaudville, LA 70512-6020; United States; 30.40336°N 92.00135°W

Information
- Type: Comprehensive public high school
- Established: 1991
- School district: St. Landry Parish School Board
- Superintendent: Milton Batiste, III
- Principal: Tiffany Etienne
- Teaching staff: 52.83 (FTE)
- Grades: 9–12
- Enrollment: 863 (2023–2024)
- Student to teacher ratio: 16.34
- Campus type: Rural
- Colors: Navy, burnt orange, and gray
- Mascot: Alligator
- Nickname: Gators
- Website: www.slpsb.org/o/bchs

Beau Chêne High School is a public secondary school located in southeastern St. Landry Parish between the communities of Grand Coteau and Arnaudville in the state of Louisiana, United States. The school was founded in 1991 when Sunset, Leonville, and Arnaudville High Schools were consolidated to form one centralized high school. The school serves the communities of Arnaudville, Cankton, Grand Coteau, Leonville, and Sunset. It is located at 7076 Highway 93, Arnaudville, Louisiana. Beau Chene High School has been cited for demonstrating inclusion among all their students.

Beau Chêne is accredited by the State of Louisiana's Department of Education.

== History ==
Beau Chêne High School is the result of consolidating the public schools in St. Landry Parish. Consolidation in St. Landry Parish began as a result of a federal lawsuit filed in 1965. The lawsuit is entitled Monteilh, et al. v. St. Landry Parish School Board, et al., No. Civ. 10912, (W.D. La. March 9, 1965). The plaintiffs in Monteilh, et al. v. St. Landry Parish School Board, et al., alleged that on or about September 7, 1964, their application for admission to Palmetto High School, Palmetto, Louisiana, were denied because of their race. Monteilh, et al. v. St. Landry Parish School Board, et al. lasted fifty-one years. U.S. District Judge Rebecca Doherty dismissed the fifty-one year old case on August 30, 2016. The previous federal judge assigned Monteilh, U.S. District Judge Tucker L. Melancon, in Graham v. Evangeline Parish School Board, was cautioned in an unpublished opinion by the United States Court of Appeals for the Fifth Circuit "to limit itself to traditional judicial decision making rather than school administration, and to refrain from day-to-day management of its decrees." The court also expressed their concern in regard to Judge Melancon being personally involved in the case and wrote his actions were more administrative than judicial. The court wrote one could perceive from the record that Judge Melancon had taken over the independent decision making of the school board. The court was unable to rule on the Graham appeal since the appeal was not a final decision from the district court. Thus, they lacked appellate jurisdiction. Graham v. Evangeline Parish School Board, Case No. 04-30356, pp. 12–14 (5th Cir. May 17, 2005).

In 1986, the St. Landry Parish School Board approved a plan to build three new high schools as part of a plan to consolidate all the high schools in St. Landry Parish. A group of citizens returned to federal court and filed briefs in Monteilh, et al. v. St. Landry Parish School Board, et al., opposing the school board plan to consolidate and build three new schools. The case was appealed to the United States Court of Appeals for the Fifth Circuit. In their briefs, Monteilh alleged the new high schools the school board planned to build would have created a quasi-racially segregated school system. Monteilh requested school construction be enjoined pending preparation of a new consolidation plan. The United States Court of Appeals for the Fifth Circuit ruled the St. Landry Parish School Board met their constitutional obligations in designing its own plan and the court denied Monteilh's request.

Beau Chêne High School was conceived in the early-1980s when the St. Landry Parish School Board began consolidating the parish's small rural high schools to form three large centrally located high schools. The plan was later approved and implemented, forcing Arnaudville High School, Leonville High School, and Sunset High School to close and merge with each other. In 1989, construction on Beau Chêne began on property in the unincorporated community of Prairie Basse. At the front of the property were—and still are—several large oak trees which inspired the name "Beau Chêne." The name of the school was originally Southeastern High School, keeping with the geographical naming style the St. Landry Parish School Board used to name the other two consolidated high schools (Northwest High School and North Central High School). Someone (reportedly Lanny Moreau, former St. Landry Parish Superintendent, who at the time was Arnaudville High School's principal) suggested that the school be named "Beau Chêne," which is French for "beautiful oak." The St. Landry Parish School Board approved naming the school Beau Chene High School as the name for the Southeast Consolidated High School on Thursday, May 17, 1990. Classes commenced at Beau Chêne on August 19, 1991. The official dedication of Beau Chene High School was on Friday, September 6, 1991.

== Academics ==
Beau Chêne High School offers a wide variety of courses for its students. In keeping with its missions to "provide the individual with rich and varied experiences appropriate to meet his present and future needs" and to "develop in the student an appreciation of literature, art, music and the beauty of nature," Beau Chêne offers classes in English language arts, mathematics, science, social studies, art, music, Spanish language arts, French language arts, agricultural science, business, family and consumer science, and computer science. Upperclassmen may opt to take trade and vocational educational courses at the Washington Career and Technical Center.

Students are required to complete four units of English, three units of mathematics, three units of science, three units of social studies, one-and-one-half units of physical education, and one-half unit of health. Students wanting to attend college follow a college preparatory curriculum which follows Louisiana's TOPS scholarship requirements, which includes four units of English, four units of mathematics, four units of science, four units of social studies, two units of a foreign language, one unit of fine arts, and a half-credit in a technology class.

== Extracurricular activities ==
Beau Chêne offers a host of clubs and organizations students can join. Those organizations are 4-H; FFA; Beta Club; National Honor Society; Spanish Club; Fellowship of Christian Athletes; Student Council; Peer Leaders; Academic Talent Search; Upward Bound; Family, Career, and Community Leaders of America; Governor's Program on Abstinence; Future Business Leaders of America; and Beau Chêne Quiz Bowl.

== Athletics ==
Beau Chêne High School is classified by the Louisiana High School Athletic Association as a Class 4-A school (Division II in volleyball and soccer) and competes in that division's District 5 (District 2 in volleyball; District 3, soccer).

Beau Chêne offers its students the following sports: Football Boys (Varsity), Basketball Boys (Varsity), Basketball Girls (Varsity), Baseball Boys (Varsity), Softball Girls (Varsity), Volleyball Girls (Varsity), Cross Country Boys (Varsity), Cross Country Girls (Varsity), Soccer Boys (Varsity), Soccer Girls (Varsity), Track & Field (Outdoor) Boys (Varsity), Track & Field (Outdoor) Girls (Varsity), Power Lifting Boys (Varsity), Power Lifting Girls (Varsity), Football Boys (Junior Varsity), Basketball Boys (Junior Varsity), Basketball Girls (Junior Varsity), Baseball Boys (Junior Varsity), Softball Girls (Junior Varsity), Volleyball Girls (Junior Varsity), Cross Country Boys (Junior Varsity), Cross Country Girls (Junior Varsity), and Soccer Boys (Junior Varsity).

The school also offers cheerleading, dancing, and color guard.
