= St. Landry Catholic Church =

Historic church in Louisiana, United States

- U.S. National Register of Historic Places
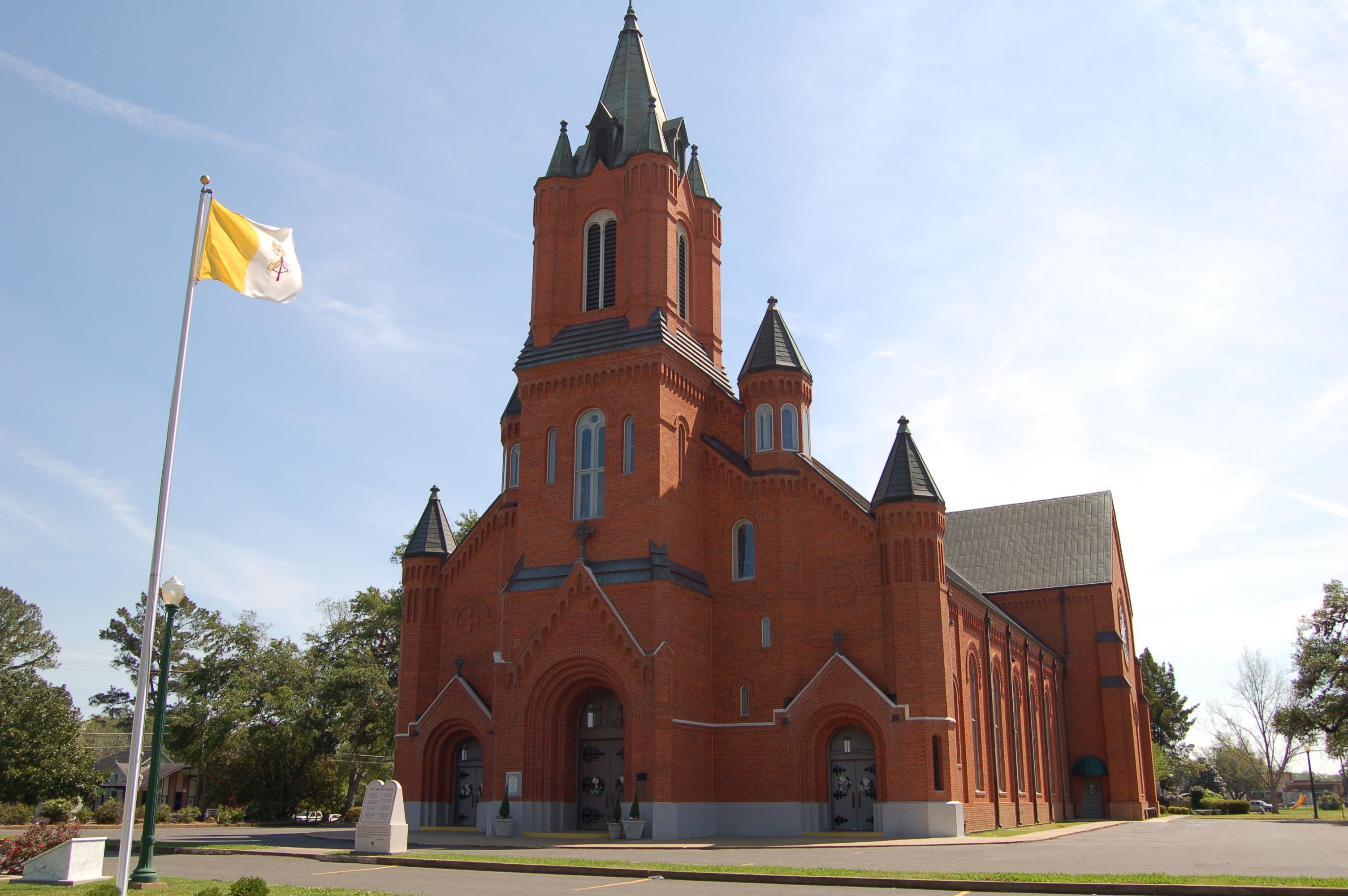

- Location within Louisiana Location within the United States
- Location: 1020 N. Union St., Opelousas, Louisiana
- Coordinates: 30°32′34″N 92°4′45″W
- Area: 1.4 acres (0.57 ha)
- Built: Completed April 1909
- Architect: T. G. Chachere; Owen & Diboll
- Architectural style: Romanesque Revival
- NRHP reference No.: 82004675
- Added to NRHP: May 3, 1982

St. Landry Catholic Church is a historic Catholic church in Opelousas, Louisiana. The current church building, in Gothic and Romanesque Revival style, was completed in 1909. The church and cemetery were placed on the National Register of Historic Places in the United States on May 5, 1982. By 1792, the church had been renamed from the original title, "Parish Church of the Immaculate Conception of the Post of Opelousas" to the “Parish Church of St. Landry.”

== History ==
In the days of the early 18th century, the area of what is now known as Opelousas was settled by a number of Catholics, many of whom were from Nova Scotia and had no established parish in which to worship. Although there was no official church yet, there was a baptism that was recorded on May 16, 1756, by Fr Pierre Didier, at the home of Jacques Courtableau (now located in Washington, Louisiana).

The early records of the church, which were saved by Fr. José [Joseph] de Arazena, the fourth pastor of the church of Opelousas from 1785 to 1789, mentions a Capuchin, Friar Valentin, as the first resident priest in 1764. The first church was built in the vicinity of present-day Port Barre, Louisiana, circa 1760. By 1764, a cypress church had been built along the Opelousas River (today Bayou Courtableau Church in present-day Washington, Louisiana), and it became the parish church. It was rebuilt in 1774 just north of present-day Bayou Carron. The records also show that the church was originally called La Iglesia Parroquial de la Immaculada Concepción del Puesto de Opeluzas (“The Parish Church of the Immaculate Conception of the Post of Opelousas”).

Worship at the present site was not begun until the year 1798, when the construction of a wood-frame building was completed, and the parish name was changed to "The Parish Church of St Landry". It is dedicated to Landry of Paris, a 7th-century bishop and saint. There is no actual record of the original location of the church, but it is believed, according to Fr. Michael Bernard Barriere, pastor from 1813 to 1817, that the church was located just south of present-day Washington, Louisiana, on the “Bayou.” He noted that: "During the year 1798, the present church was moved from the bayou (he spells it "Baillou") [from] the locality called 'Ponte a M. Tesson.'"

Michel Prudhomme donated a section of land of 120 arpents (100 acres), 3x40 arpents in width/length, and M. Tesson donated a section of 1 by 14 arpents (0.84 by 11.83 acres). The land donated by Mrs. Tesson was located between the present site of the church and Bayou Tesson, also known as the Gully, to the west. The donation of land was made on October 16, 1796. Later the land donated by Tesson was sold to the Marguilliers and was known as the "Church Addition". A Marguillier is a churchwarden: churchwardens were a group of layman who were in charge of the church property and money. They governed the church and even controlled the salary of the priests in many cases. Michel Prudhomme is buried in the nave of the present church. Michel Prudhomme's French Colonial home, built around 1790, still stands near the church, and is on the National Register of Historic Places.

By the mid-19th century, the old wooden structure that was built on in 1797, was in dilapidated condition. It had lasted about fifty years. On an official visit by the Bishop William Louis Dubourg, a recommendation was made that a new church be built. If possible, a brick structure was to be erected. Finally, on March 4, 1828, the new brick church was consecrated by Bishop Rosati, of St. Louis, Administrator of Louisiana. The church measured 60 × 40 ft (18 × 12 m), and was later expanded to 100 feet (30 m) wide by Fr. Gilbert Raymond. Fr. Gilbert and his brother, Fr. J. Francois Raymond, were in charge of the parish for thirty-five years. They started a school for boys which was known as St. Mary's Academy for Boys (1855). Fr. Gilbert’s next step was affording the girls the same opportunity of acquiring a solid, Christian education. After purchasing a piece of land, the Academy of the Immaculate Conception was established in 1856.

During the year of 1870, Fr. Gilbert Raymond purchased another piece of land for the creation of a school for the black children of the parish. This school was known under the name of St. Joseph's School. In 1971, the schools were combined to form Opelousas Catholic School.

In 1895, Fr. John Engberink was assigned from as past of St. Landry. He set out to build a new church building. This was a great undertaking and would prove to be a great asset to the worshipers of the parish of St. Landry. The work of removing and clearing away of the old church was started in 1902. A temporary church, which had been completed and occupied in 1900, was used until the new church was erected. The new rectory was occupied at the same time. The old bricks of the previous structure were preserved and used in the foundation of the present church.

The actual work on the new church was started in September, 1903. The foundation resting on a bed of concrete 6-by-1-foot wide/deep (1.83 m × 0.30 m), starting 7 feet (2.1 m) below the surface of the ground, was built four feet above the surface and given considerable time to harden, before the walls were started. The construction of the walls began in the winter of 1908-09 and was completed and occupied, the first Mass being said on the first Friday of April 1909. The cornerstone had been laid August 8, 1908. The size of the church was very large, being 189 by 94 feet (58 m × 29 m) wide in the transepts, and 74 ft wide (23 m) in the body of the church. The seating capacity was about 2000. The church had been the second-largest church in the South for many years and is the second-oldest parish in the diocese. The interior of the church was not completed until the early 1920s because of a lack of funds.

When in 1919, Monsignor Albeit Benedict Colliard was made pastor, after the death of Fr. Engberink, he took on the task of completing the church. Msgr. Colliard paid off the large debt incurred in building the church and added stained-glass windows. When the church was first built there was only a flat roof on the tower, however, Msgr. Colliard added the steeple in 1940.

In 1920, due to the fact that Black parishioners were restricted to two pews in the back of the church, they established their own parish roughly a block away, known as Holy Ghost Catholic Church.

Monsignor Colliard died on May 7, 1950, at the age of 69 and is buried in the St. Landry Catholic Cemetery. Monsignor Broussard was the next pastor of the parish. Arriving in 1950, he remained until 1972. While here, Msgr. Broussard reestablished a boys' school. As a builder he moved the academy, which is now Opelousas Catholic School, from south of the church to due east of the church, had a new two-story rectory constructed north of the church, and then in 1963 had the interior of the church redecorated and air conditioned.

The church and the church cemetery were placed on the National Register of Historic Places in the United States on May 5, 1982.

To this date there have been 33 pastors and countless assistants who have served the people of this parish. Monsignor Russell J. Harrington is the current pastor, with John W. Miller, Sammy Diesi, and Dwayne Joubert as his Permanent Deacons.

Father Joseph Verbis Lafleur, who is a candidate for sainthood within the Catholic Church, became a parish priest of this church.

The patron saints of the church parish are Saint Landry the Confessor and Our Lady of the Immaculate Conception.
