= Opelousas, Louisiana =

Opelousas, Louisiana Les Opélousas (French) Los Opeluzás (Spanish)
- City
- City of Opelousas; Ville des Opélousas (French)
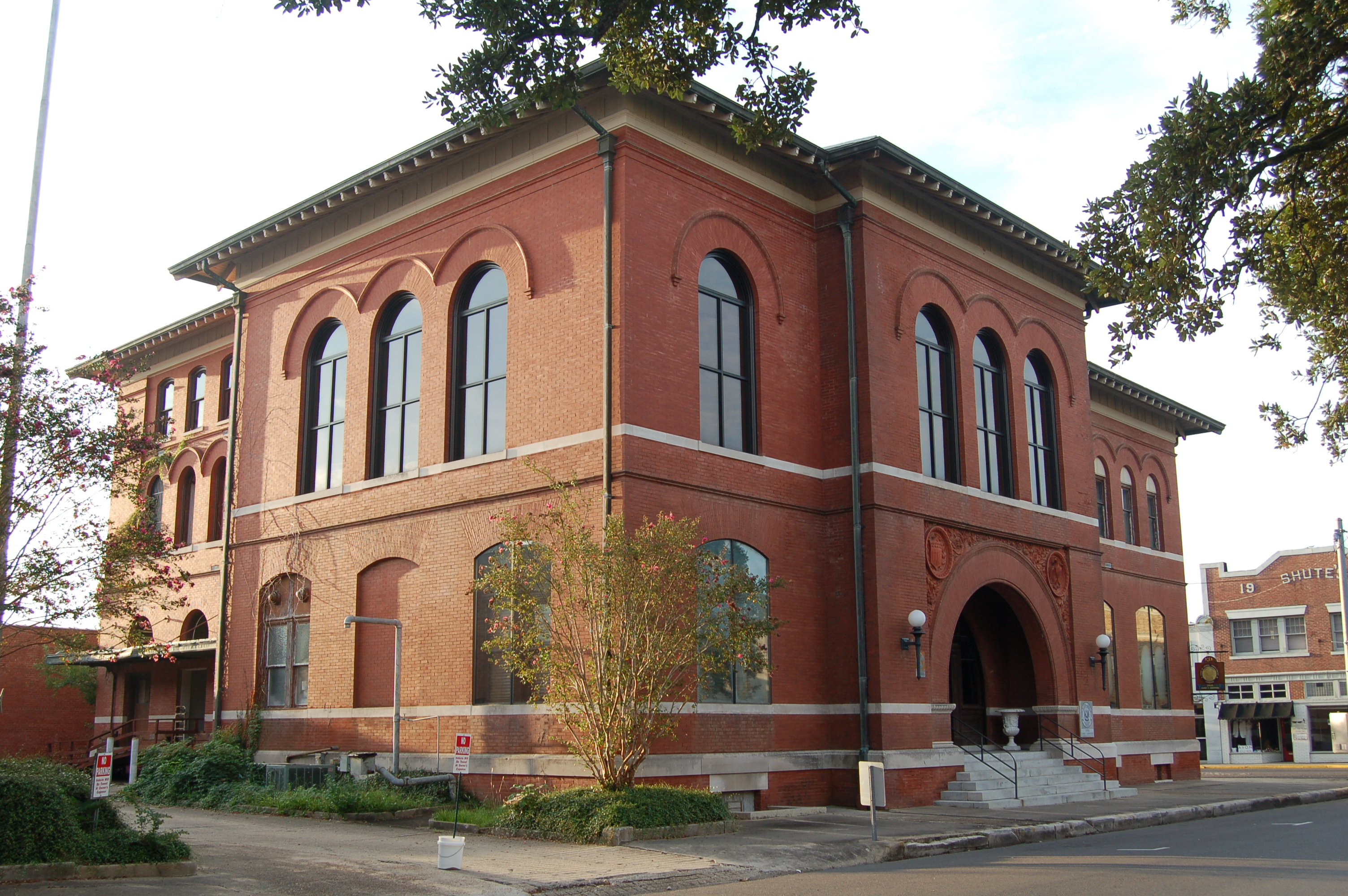
- Old Federal Courthouse in Opelousas, listed on the National Register of Historic Places
- Motto: "Omnia ad Dei Gloriam – All Things to the Glory of God."
- Location of Opelousas in St. Landry Parish, Louisiana.

- Location of Louisiana in the United States
- Coordinates: 30°30′15″N 92°04′46″W
- Country: United States
- State: Louisiana
- Parish: St. Landry
- Incorporated: 1821 (205 years ago)
- Named for: Opelousas people

Government
  - Mayor: Julius Alsandor

Area
  - Total: 9.68 sq mi (25.06 km^{2})
  - Land: 9.67 sq mi (25.05 km^{2})
  - Water: 0.0039 sq mi (0.01 km^{2})
- Elevation: 66 ft (20 m)

Population (2020)
  - Total: 15,786
  - Density: 1,632.2/sq mi (630.18/km^{2})
- Time zone: UTC−6 (CST)
  - Summer (DST): UTC−5 (CDT)
- ZIP code: 70570
- Area code: 337
- FIPS code: 22-58045
- GNIS feature ID: 2404436
- Website: http://www.cityofopelousas.com

Opelousas (/ˌɒpəˈluːsəs/; French: Les Opélousas; Spanish: Los Opeluzás) is a small city in and the parish seat of St. Landry Parish, Louisiana, United States. Interstate 49 and U.S. Route 190 were constructed with a junction here. The U.S. Census Bureau’s 2025 estimated population for Opelousas is 15,098. According to the 2020 census, Opelousas has a population of 15,786, a 6.53 percent decline since the 2010 census, which had recorded a population of 16,634. Opelousas is the principal city for the Opelousas-Eunice Micropolitan Statistical Area, which had an estimated population of 80,808 in 2020. Opelousas is also the fourth largest city in the Lafayette-Acadiana Combined Statistical Area, which has a population of 537,947.

Historically an area of settlement by French and Spanish Creoles, Creoles of color, and Acadians, Opelousas is the center of zydeco music. It celebrates its heritage at the Creoles of Color Heritage Folklife Center, one of the destinations on the new Louisiana African-American Heritage Trail. It is also the location of the Evangeline Downs Racetrack and Casino.

The city calls itself "the spice capital of the world", with production and sale of seasonings such as Tony Chachere's products, Targil Seasonings, Savoie's cajun meats and products, and LouAna Cooking Oil.

During the tenure of Sheriff Cat Doucet, from 1936 to 1940 and again from 1952 to 1968, the section of Opelousas along Highway 190 was a haven of gambling and prostitution, the profits from which he skimmed a take.

== History ==
=== Early years ===
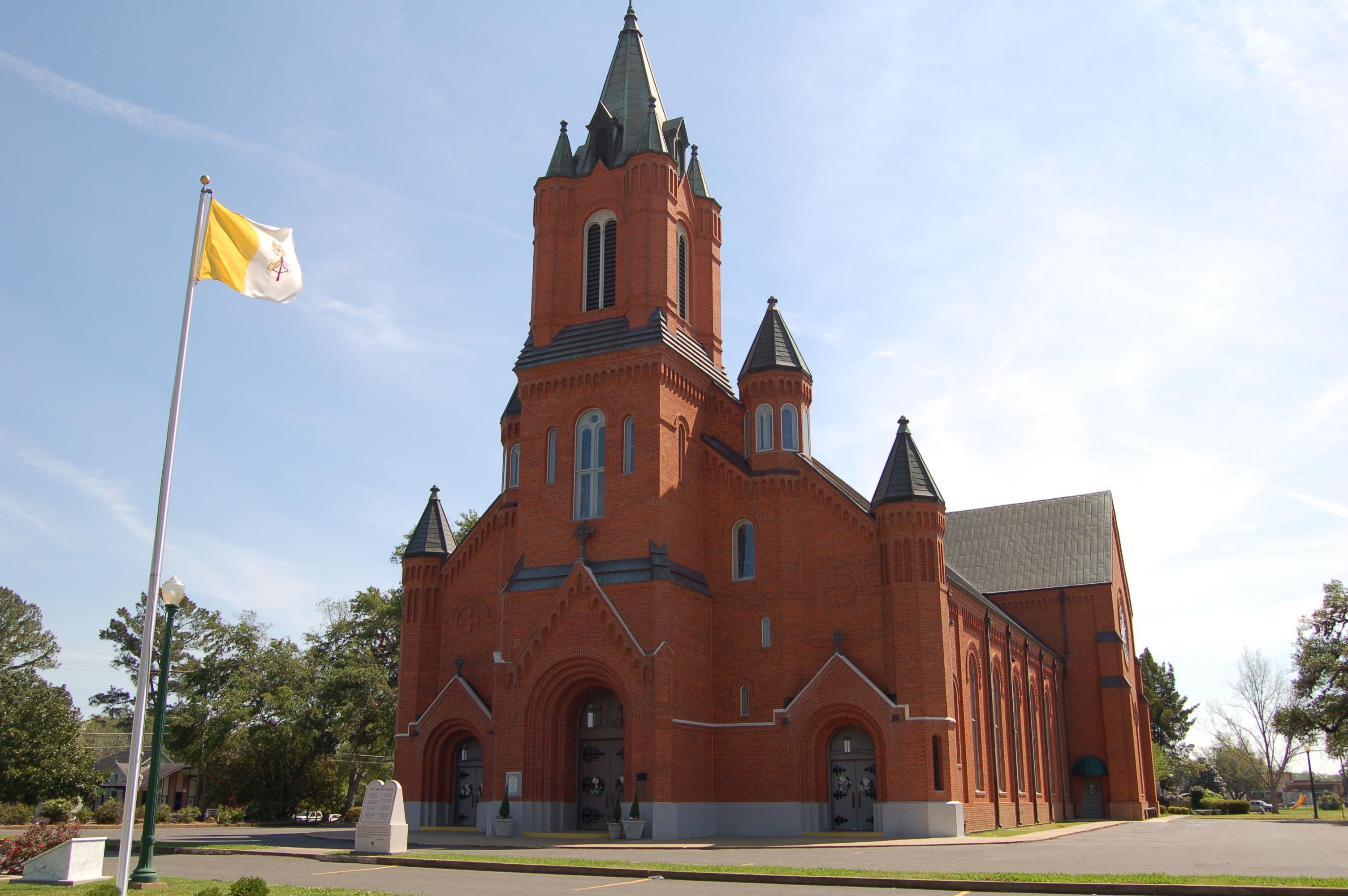
Saint Landry Catholic Church

Opelousas takes its name from the Native American tribe Opelousa who had occupied the area before European contact.

French traders, called coureurs de bois (forest trappers and hunters), arrived in the Opelousas area in the early 1740s to trade with the Opelousas Indians. The French encouraged immigration to the Opelousas Post before they ceded Louisiana to Spain in 1762. Governor Jean-Jacques d’Abbadie opened the "Opelousas Country" to settlers in 1763. An official post was established in 1764; Frenchman Louis Gérard Pellerin was appointed as the first commandant on July 1, 1764.

By 1764, the “Parish Church of the Immaculate Conception of the Post of Opelousas” (later Saint Landry Catholic Church) was built. In 1769, about 100 families, mostly French, were living in the post. Don Alejandro O'Reilly, Spanish governor of Louisiana, issued a land ordinance to allow settlers in the frontier of the Opelousas Territory to acquire land grants. However, O’Reilly forbade Acadians from settling in the Opelousas area until his successor, Luis de Unzaga, nullified that order and allowed Acadians to settle at the Opelousas. The first official land grant was made in 1782. Numerous settlers: French, Spanish, Creoles, and Acadians – mainly from the Attakapas Territory – came to the Opelousas Territory and acquired land grants. By the mid-1780s, land was granted at the site of contemporary Opelousas. (Some people confuse the name of this Indian tribe and territory, Opelousas, with that of the Appaloosa horse. But there is no connection; the name for the Appaloosa breed is derived from Palouse, a river named by the Nez Perce Northwestern Plains Indians.)

After the Louisiana Purchase of 1803 to France who had regained it in 1800, settlers continued to migrate here from St. Martinville. LeBon, Prejean, Thibodaux, Esprit, Nezat, Hebert, Babineaux, Mouton, and Provost were some of the early Creole families. (This use of Creole meant ethnic French and Spanish people who were born in Louisiana. Later Louisiana Creole was a term applied to anyone with French, Spanish, and Canadian ancestry. Creoles of color were mostly assigned to mixed-race people, descended primarily from Native Americans, African-Americans, and ethnic French, with other heritage in more recent years.) Other early French Creole families were Roy, Barre, Guenard, Decuir, and Bail. In 1820, Alex Charles Barre, also a French Creole, founded Port Barre. His ancestors came from the French West Indies, probably after the revolution in which Haiti (St. Domingue) became independent. Jim Bowie and his family were said to have settled in the area circa 1813.

In 1805, Opelousas became the seat of the newly formed St. Landry Parish – named after the church located there and in honor of Saint Landry – the parish was also known as the Imperial Parish of Louisiana. The year 1806 marked the beginning of significant construction in Opelousas. The first courthouse was constructed in the middle of the town. Later in 1806, Louisiana Memorial United Methodist Church was founded. It was the first Methodist church in Louisiana. Five years later, the first St. Landry Parish Police Jury met in Opelousas, keeping minutes in the two official languages of English and French. The city was incorporated by legislative act on February 14, 1821.

=== American Civil War ===
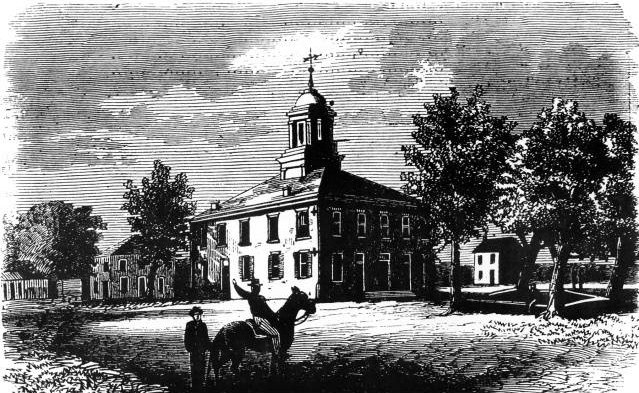
View of St Landry Parish Courthouse at Opelousas during the Civil War

European and American settlement was based on plantation agriculture, and both groups brought or purchased numerous enslaved Africans and African Americans to work as laborers in cotton cultivation. African Americans influenced all cultures as the people created a "creolized" cuisine and music. The long decline of cotton prices throughout the 19th century created economic problems, worsened by the lack of employment diversity.

In 1862, after Baton Rouge was liberated by Union troops during the Civil War, Opelousas was designated the state capital for nine months. The governor's mansion in Opelousas, which was the oldest remaining governor's mansion in Louisiana, was the victim of arson on July 14, 2016, and the structure was reduced to a chimney and its foundation. The one-story mansion was located on the corner of Liberty and Grolee Streets, just west of the heart of town. An observation tower was removed from the top of the residence in the early 1900s, but the remainder of the exterior was identical to its original construction in the 1850s. The entire roof section of heavy rafters was held in place by thousands of wooden pegs; not one nail could be found in the attic. Plans had been made to restore the building to some of its former splendor. The capital was moved again in 1863, this time to Shreveport, when Union troops occupied Opelousas. During Reconstruction, the state government operated from New Orleans.

=== Reconstruction ===
After the defeat of the Confederacy and emancipation of slaves, many whites had difficulty accepting the changed conditions, especially as economic problems and dependence on agriculture slowed the South's recovery. Social tensions were high during Reconstruction. In 1868, in what is known as the Opelousas massacre, whites killed 27 African Americans in a mass execution; they had been captured in a protest. Whites continued to attack blacks on sight for days. An estimated additional 23 to 200–300 freedmen were killed during this period. This series of murders comprised one of the single worst instances of Reconstruction violence in south Louisiana.

Following this, Opelousas in 1872 enacted ordinances that greatly restricted the freedoms of black Americans. These codes required blacks to have a written pass from their employer to enter the town and to state the duration of their visit. Blacks were not allowed on the streets after a 10 pm curfew; they could neither own a house nor reside in the town, unless they were employed by a white person, and they were not allowed in the town after 3 pm on Sundays. Like the Black Codes, such police regulations restricted the freedoms and personal autonomy of freedmen after the Civil War in the South.

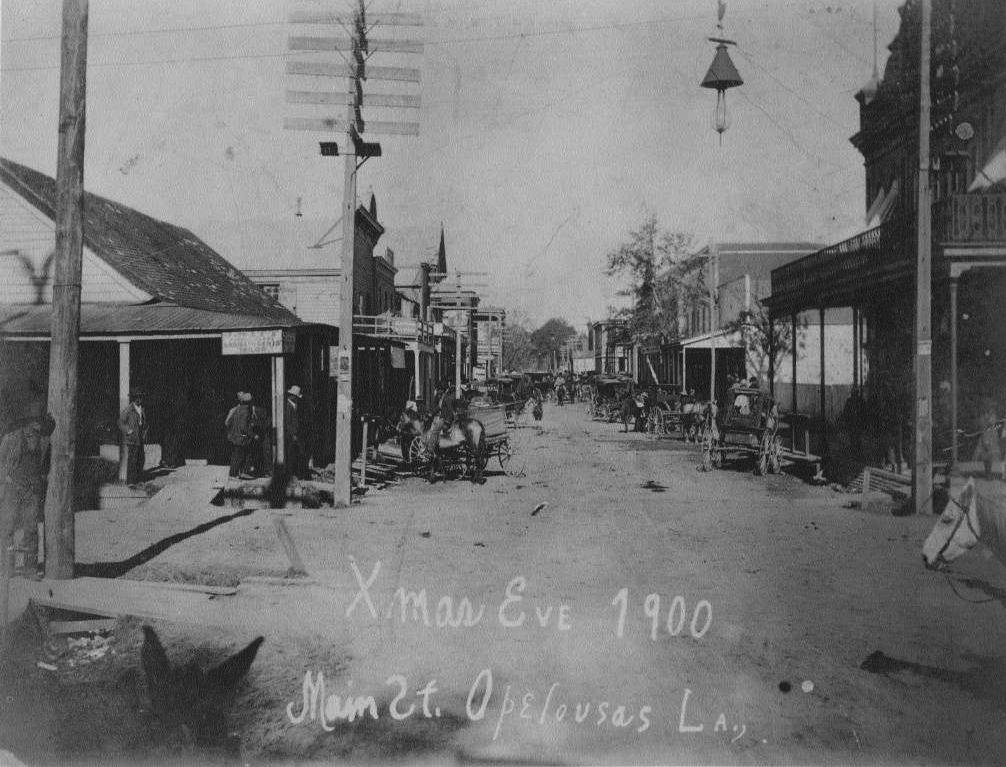
Main Street, Opelousas, 24 December 1900

=== Refugee era and beyond ===
In 1880, the railroad reached Opelousas. In the late 19th century, New York City social services agencies arranged for resettlement of Catholic orphan children by sending them to western rural areas, including Opelousas, in Louisiana and other states. At least three Orphan Trains reached this city before 1929. Opelousas is the heart of a traditional Catholic region of French, Spanish, Canadian, and French West Indian ancestry. Catholic families in Louisiana took in more than 2,000 mostly Catholic orphans to live in their rural farming communities.

In the year 1920, segregation at St Landry Catholic Church led local Black Catholics to establish their own parish, Holy Ghost. It has since grown to become the largest Black parish in the United States.

In May 1927, Opelousas accepted thousands of refugees following the Great Mississippi Flood of 1927 in the Mississippi Delta. Heavy rains in northern and midwestern areas caused intense flooding in areas of Mississippi, Arkansas, and Louisiana downstream, especially after levées near Moreauville, Cecilia, and Melville collapsed.

More than 81% of St. Landry Parish suffered some flooding, with 77% of the inhabitants directly affected. People in more southern areas of Louisiana, especially those communities along Bayou Teche, were forced to flee their homes for areas that suffered less damage. By May 20, over 5,700 refugees were registered in Opelousas, which had a population of only 6,000 people. Many of the refugees later returned to their homes and began the rebuilding process.

During the tenure of Parish Sheriff Cat Doucet from 1936 to 1940 and 1952 to 1968, the section of Opelousas along Highway 190 was a haven of gambling and prostitution. Doucet told historian Michael Kurtz that, with the return of Earl Long to the governorship in 1956, Doucet could bring back brothels and casinos and get a take of the proceeds.

== Demographics ==
Historical population
Census	Pop.	Note	%±
1860	786		—
1870	1,546		96.7%
1880	1,676		8.4%
1890	1,572		−6.2%
1900	2,951		87.7%
1910	4,623		56.7%
1920	4,437		−4.0%
1930	6,299		42.0%
1940	8,980		42.6%
1950	11,659		29.8%
1960	17,417		49.4%
1970	20,387		17.1%
1980	18,903		−7.3%
1990	18,151		−4.0%
2000	22,860		25.9%
2010	16,634		−27.2%
2020	15,786		−5.1%
2025 (est.)	15,098	▼	−4.4%
U.S. Decennial Census

=== 2020 census ===
As of the 2020 census, Opelousas had a population of 15,786. The median age was 36.4 years. 26.7% of residents were under the age of 18 and 16.7% of residents were 65 years of age or older. For every 100 females there were 86.2 males, and for every 100 females age 18 and over there were 82.9 males age 18 and over.

99.9% of residents lived in urban areas, while 0.1% lived in rural areas.

There were 6,209 households in Opelousas, including 3,527 families. Of all households, 31.7% had children under the age of 18 living in them, 24.2% were married-couple households, 22.1% were households with a male householder and no spouse or partner present, and 48.0% were households with a female householder and no spouse or partner present. About 36.1% of all households were made up of individuals and 15.5% had someone living alone who was 65 years of age or older.

There were 7,319 housing units, of which 15.2% were vacant. The homeowner vacancy rate was 1.8% and the rental vacancy rate was 6.6%.

Opelousas racial composition as of 2020
Race	Number	Percentage
White (non-Hispanic)	2,799	17.73%
Black or African American (non-Hispanic)	12,183	77.18%
Native American	34	0.22%
Asian	116	0.73%
Other/Mixed	397	2.51%
Hispanic or Latino	257	1.63%

== Festivals ==
The annual Yambilee Festival in Opelousas began in 1946. The harvest festival took place on the last weekend in October. Activities included agricultural competitions, carnival rides, pageants, and parades with floats. John F. Kennedy once attended. The festival has since been cancelled.

Since 1982, Opelousas has hosted the Original Southwest Louisiana Zydeco Festival. Usually held the Saturday before Labor Day at Zydeco Park in Plaisance, the festival has since moved to the Yambilee Festival grounds in Opelousas proper. The one-of-a-kind festival features a day of performances by Zydeco musicians, with the goal of keeping the genre alive.

Additional annual events include:

- Annual Gumbo Cook-off – January
- Holy Ghost Festival – first weekend of November, near All Saints Day (Nov. 1)
- Christmas Lighting of Le Vieux Village- first Friday every December
- Opelousas Imperial Mardi Gras Parade- Mardi Gras (Tuesday before Ash Wednesday in French Catholic tradition)
- Opelousas Mardi Gras Celebration/Street Dance on Court St.- Mardi Gras

== Education ==
Opelousas is home to several public and private schools. Opelousas has many public high schools, which are Opelousas Senior High, Northwest High School, and Magnet Academy for Cultural Arts. Opelousas Junior High serves as the area middle school. The city has seven public elementary schools. It is also home to one of the campuses of South Louisiana Community College.

The private schools are religiously based, including Opelousas Catholic School, Westminster Christian Academy, Apostolic Christian Academy, New Hope Christian Academy, and Family Worship Christian Academy.

== Transportation ==
Opelousas is served by Interstate 49 and US Route 190, as well as state highways including 31, 104, 182, 357, 749, and 3043.

Freight rail service includes the Union Pacific Railroad and the shortline Acadiana Railway.

Opelousas is home to the St. Landry Parish Airport (KOPL), owned by the St. Landry Parish Government, which has a main paved runway 5,999’ by 100’. Commercial air transportation is available at Lafayette Regional Airport, about 26 miles to the south, or Baton Rouge Metropolitan Airport, about 59 miles to the east.

== Media ==
Opelousas is part of the Lafayette television and radio markets.

The city is home to KOCZ-LP, a low power community radio station owned and operated by the Southern Development Foundation. The station was built by numerous volunteers from Opelousas and around the country at the third Prometheus Radio Project barnraising.

KOCZ broadcasts music, news, and public affairs to listeners now at 92.9. It was originally on 103.7, but had to move due to a full-power station being licensed to 103.7. Opelousas is home to The Mix KOGM 107.1FM, which is owned by KSLO Broadcasting, Inc.

There are two TV stations based in Opelousas, KDCG-CD (Class A Digital) TV Channel 22 and K39JV, another low power on channel 39.

== Economy ==
The primary industries in Opelousas are agriculture, oil, manufacturing, wholesale, and retail.

The horse racing track Evangeline Downs relocated to Opelousas from its former home in Carencro, Louisiana, in 2003. It employs over 600 workers.

Opelousas is also home to Tony Chachere, a Louisiana spice company with a worldwide reach. The company makes a variety of seasoning blends, sauces, marinades, and other products.

In September 1999, Wal-Mart opened a large distribution center just north of the city. It is generating an $89 million impact per year to the area, employing over 600 full-time workers.

== Sports ==
Opelousas was home to the Opelousas Indians, a minor league baseball franchise that was based in Opelousas in 1907, 1932 and 1934–1941. The Indians were members of the Gulf Coast League (1907) and Evangeline League (1934–1941). The team played at Elementary School Park. The Opelousas Orphans played a portion of the 1932 season in the Cotton States League. Opelousas was an affiliate of the Cleveland Indians (1935–1937, 1939).

== Notable people ==
=== Athletes ===
- Daniel Baldridge, offensive tackle for the Jacksonville Jaguars and the Tennessee Titans
- Keon Coleman, wide receiver for the Buffalo Bills
- Devery Henderson, wide receiver for the New Orleans Saints
- CeeDee Lamb, wide receiver for the Dallas Cowboys
- Rod Milburn, 1972 Summer Olympics gold medalist
- Lloyd Mumphord, NFL cornerback and special-teams captain for Miami Dolphins
- Remi Prudhomme, professional football player
- Marvin White, safety for the Cincinnati Bengals
- JJ Thomas, Small forward for Cal State Northridge Matadors Men's Basketball

=== Clergy ===
- Dominic Carmon, Roman Catholic bishop
- W. C. Friley, Baptist clergyman who helped establish First Baptist Church Opelousas.
- Charles Michael Jarrell, Roman Catholic bishop
- Joseph Verbis Lafleur, Roman Catholic priest of the Military Ordinariate of the United States, his beatification process has been opened

=== Culinary ===
- Chef Tony Chachere was born in Opelousas; the town is home to his company, Tony Chachere Creole Foods.
- Chef Paul Prudhomme

=== Entertainers ===
- Rod Bernard, American singer who helped to pioneer the musical genre known as "swamp pop"
- Tex Brashear, voice-over/cartoon voice actor
- Clifton Chenier, legendary zydeco musician
- Richard Eastham (1916–2005), actor
- Mabel Sonnier Savoie, American singer, guitarist

=== Historians ===
- Carl A. Brasseaux, historian of French Colonial Louisiana
- Winston De Ville, Colonial Louisiana and Mississippi Valley historian, genealogist and author

=== Politicians ===
- Cindy Courville, first US Ambassador to the African Union
- Jay Dean, mayor of Longview, Texas, 2005–2015; Republican member of the Texas House of Representatives
- Cat Doucet, Sheriff of St. Landry Parish, 1936–40; 1952–68
- Gilbert L. Dupré, state representative and district court judge for St. Landry Parish
- H. Garland Dupré, state representative and U.S. representative for Louisiana's 2nd congressional district
- Jacques Dupré, 8th Governor of Louisiana
- Ivan L. R. Lemelle, Federal Judge, U.S. District Court, Eastern District of Louisiana
- Charles Nash, African American Republican Representative during the Reconstruction era
- André B. Roman, 9th Governor of Louisiana
- Albert Tate, Jr., Louisiana Chief Justice, later served on the United States Fifth Circuit Court of Appeals.

=== Others ===
- Jim Bowie, legendary adventurer and hero of the Alamo, lived in Opelousas for a time
- Rezin Bowie, brother of Jim Bowie and inventor of the famous Bowie knife
- Bobby Dunbar, four-year-old child who went missing in 1912
- Antoinette Frank, death-row inmate at the Louisiana Correctional Institute
- J.J. Alfred Mouton, Confederate general killed during the Battle of Mansfield, Louisiana
- Georgia Ann Robinson, first African-American woman to serve as an officer in the Los Angeles Police Department
- Harry Swinney, physicist and member of the National Academy of Sciences

== In popular culture ==
The folk-rock singer Lucinda Williams mentions Opelousas in the song "Concrete and Barbed Wire" from her critically acclaimed album Car Wheels on a Gravel Road. Singer-songwriter and comedian Henry Phillips mentions Opelousas as one of the venues in his song "I'm In Minneapolis (You're In Hollywood)"'.

American born singer-songwriter, Victoria Williams, has a song called “Opelousas (Sweet Relief)” that was popularly covered by Maria McKee on the Sweet Relief benefit Album, Sweet Relief a Benefit for Victoria Williams.

Jack Kerouac mentions Opelousas in a poem towards the end of his novel On the Road. The poem was later put to music by Tom Waits as Home I'll Never Be and included on his 2006 album Orphans: Brawlers, Bawlers & Bastards.
