= National Register of Historic Places listings in St. Landry Parish, Louisiana =

Location of St. Landry Parish in Louisiana

This is a list of the National Register of Historic Places listings in St. Landry Parish, Louisiana.

This is intended to be a complete list of the properties and districts on the National Register of Historic Places in St. Landry Parish, Louisiana, United States. The locations of National Register properties and districts for which the latitude and longitude coordinates are included below, may be seen in a map.

There are 37 properties and districts listed on the National Register in the parish. Another property was once listed but has been removed.

This National Park Service list is complete through NPS recent listings posted May 1, 2026.

== Current listings ==
	Name on the Register	Image	Date listed	Location	City or town	Description
1	Academy of the Sacred Heart	Academy of the Sacred Heart	February 18, 1975 (#75002079)	Northeast of Grand Coteau; 30°25′51″N 92°02′14″W	Grand Coteau	
2	Arlington Plantation House		August 11, 1982 (#82004676)	North of Washington off Louisiana Highway 103; 30°38′48″N 92°04′19″W	Washington vicinity	
3	Burleigh House		August 11, 1982 (#82004673)	Burleigh Lane; 30°24′44″N 92°02′54″W	Grand Coteau	
4	Chretien Point Plantation	Chretien Point Plantation	May 26, 1977 (#77001519)	2 miles southwest of Sunset on Blue Spring Rd. 30°23′26″N 92°05′55″W	Sunset vicinity	
5	Martin Donato House		April 27, 2005 (#05000345)	8343 U.S. Route 182; 30°33′14″N 92°04′03″W	Opelousas	
6	Edward Benjamin Dubuisson House	Edward Benjamin Dubuisson House	February 14, 1997 (#97000059)	437 N. Court St. 30°32′16″N 92°04′58″W	Opelousas	
7	Alexandre Fontenot fils House		October 22, 1982 (#82000453)	South of Grand Prairie off Louisiana Highway 103; 30°40′31″N 92°08′31″W	Grand Prairie	
8	Frozard Plantation House		August 12, 1982 (#82004674)	South of Grand Coteau off Louisiana Highway 93; 30°24′37″N 91°59′57″W	Grand Coteau vicinity	
9	Grand Coteau Historic District		November 25, 1980 (#80004320)	Louisiana Highway 93; 30°25′39″N 92°02′24″W	Grand Coteau	
10	Homeplace		October 8, 1980 (#80004321)	North of Washington on Louisiana Highway 182; 30°40′44″N 92°03′27″W	Washington vicinity	
11	Labyche-Estorge House	Labyche-Estorge House	October 5, 1982 (#82000454)	427 N. Market St. 30°32′15″N 92°05′05″W	Opelousas	
12	LaFleur House		March 5, 1998 (#98000179)	753 Louisiana Highway 748; 30°40′46″N 92°09′22″W	Grand Prairie	
13	Dominique LaLanne House and Store		August 3, 1976 (#76002166)	Southwestern corner of Bridge and Dejean Sts. 30°36′53″N 92°03′21″W	Washington	
14	Lamorandier-Prudhomme-Jackson House	Lamorandier-Prudhomme-Jackson House	December 22, 1983 (#83003635)	Off U.S. Route 167; 30°35′04″N 92°03′41″W	Opelousas vicinity	
15	John Lewis House		April 22, 1991 (#91000418)	Address Restricted	Opelousas	
16	Liberty Theatre	Liberty Theatre	February 19, 1987 (#87000177)	200 W. Park Ave. 30°29′35″N 92°24′58″W	Eunice	
17	Midland Branch Railroad Depot	Midland Branch Railroad Depot	September 27, 1983 (#83000538)	1st and North Sts. 30°29′37″N 92°24′54″W	Eunice	
18	Montet House		April 12, 2006 (#06000244)	157 Shady Ln. 30°21′56″N 92°02′03″W	Arnaudville vicinity	
19	Moundville Plantation House		December 12, 1976 (#76002167)	2.5 miles northwest of Washington off Louisiana Highway 103; 30°38′37″N 92°04′20″W	Washington vicinity	
20	Mouton House	Mouton House	August 9, 1991 (#91001045)	261 N. Liberty St. 30°32′10″N 92°05′12″W	Opelousas	Destroyed due to arson in July 2016.
21	Old Federal Building	Old Federal Building	December 28, 1982 (#82000455)	162 S. Court St. 30°31′58″N 92°04′58″W	Opelousas	
22	Opelousas City Hall	Opelousas City Hall	September 8, 1987 (#87001470)	Junction of Market and Bellevue Sts. at Courthouse Sq. 30°32′03″N 92°05′02″W	Opelousas	1932-built Classical Revival structure.
23	Opelousas Historic District	Opelousas Historic District	June 2, 1989 (#89000477)	Roughly bounded by Bellevue, Court St., Landry St., and Market St. 30°32′01″N 92°05′00″W	Opelousas	
24	Plaisance School	Plaisance School	August 23, 2004 (#04000080)	3264 Louisiana Highway 167; 30°37′07″N 92°07′57″W	Plaisance vicinity	Built in 1921, only known Rosenwald School in Louisiana still used for education.
25	Poiret Place		April 7, 1983 (#83000539)	Northwest of Opelousas off Louisiana Highway 167; 30°37′34″N 92°07′53″W	Opelousas vicinity	
26	Michel Prudhomme House	Michel Prudhomme House	May 24, 1977 (#77001518)	1152 Prudhomme Circle; 30°32′39″N 92°04′35″W	Opelousas	
27	Ray Homestead	Ray Homestead	November 28, 1990 (#90001758)	378 W. Bellevue St. 30°32′05″N 92°05′10″W	Opelousas	
28	Robin House and Barn	Robin House and Barn	August 27, 1999 (#99001036)	1616 Louisiana Highway 31; 30°26′54″N 91°55′24″W	Arnaudville vicinity	
29	St. Landry Catholic Church	St. Landry Catholic Church	May 3, 1982 (#82004675)	900 N. Union St. 30°32′34″N 92°04′45″W	Opelousas	
30	St. Landry Lumber Company	St. Landry Lumber Company	August 7, 1989 (#89001044)	215 N. Railroad Ave. 30°32′08″N 92°05′16″W	Opelousas	
31	St. Luke General Hospital		November 26, 2025 (#100012341)	225 Guidroz Street; 30°24′10″N 91°56′07″W	Arnaudville	
32	Starvation Point		May 15, 1980 (#80004323)	North of Washington off Louisiana Highways 10/132; 30°39′01″N 92°03′48″W	Washington vicinity	
33	Sunset High School	Sunset High School	May 12, 1999 (#99000556)	223 Marie St. 30°24′47″N 92°03′54″W	Sunset	
34	Venus House	Venus House	April 22, 1991 (#91000419)	Junction of U.S. Route 190 and Academy St. 30°31′52″N 92°04′29″W	Opelousas	
35	Washington Historic District		November 15, 1978 (#78003114)	Louisiana Highway 182; 30°36′54″N 92°03′33″W	Washington	
36	White's Chapel United Methodist Church	White's Chapel United Methodist Church	April 5, 1983 (#83000540)	South of Bunkie off Louisiana Highway 29; 30°50′01″N 92°12′12″W	Bunkie vicinity	
37	Wier House	Wier House	April 7, 1995 (#95000368)	310 E. Bellevue St. 30°32′03″N 92°04′52″W	Opelousas	

== Former listings ==
	Name on the Register	Image	Date listed	Date removed	Location	City or town	Description
1	Jacques Dupre House		April 12, 1990 (#90000543)	December 5, 2003	Off US 167, N of Opelousas	Opelousas vicinity	
2	MacLand Plantation House		October 8, 1980 (#80004322)	March 24, 2006	3.4 mi N of Washington on LA 10	Washington vicinity	Delisted due to relocation to West Feliciana Parish.

== See also ==
- Alexis LaTour House: relocated from Evangeline Parish and then delisted
- List of National Historic Landmarks in Louisiana
- National Register of Historic Places listings in Louisiana
