= John Thierry =

American football player (1971-2017)

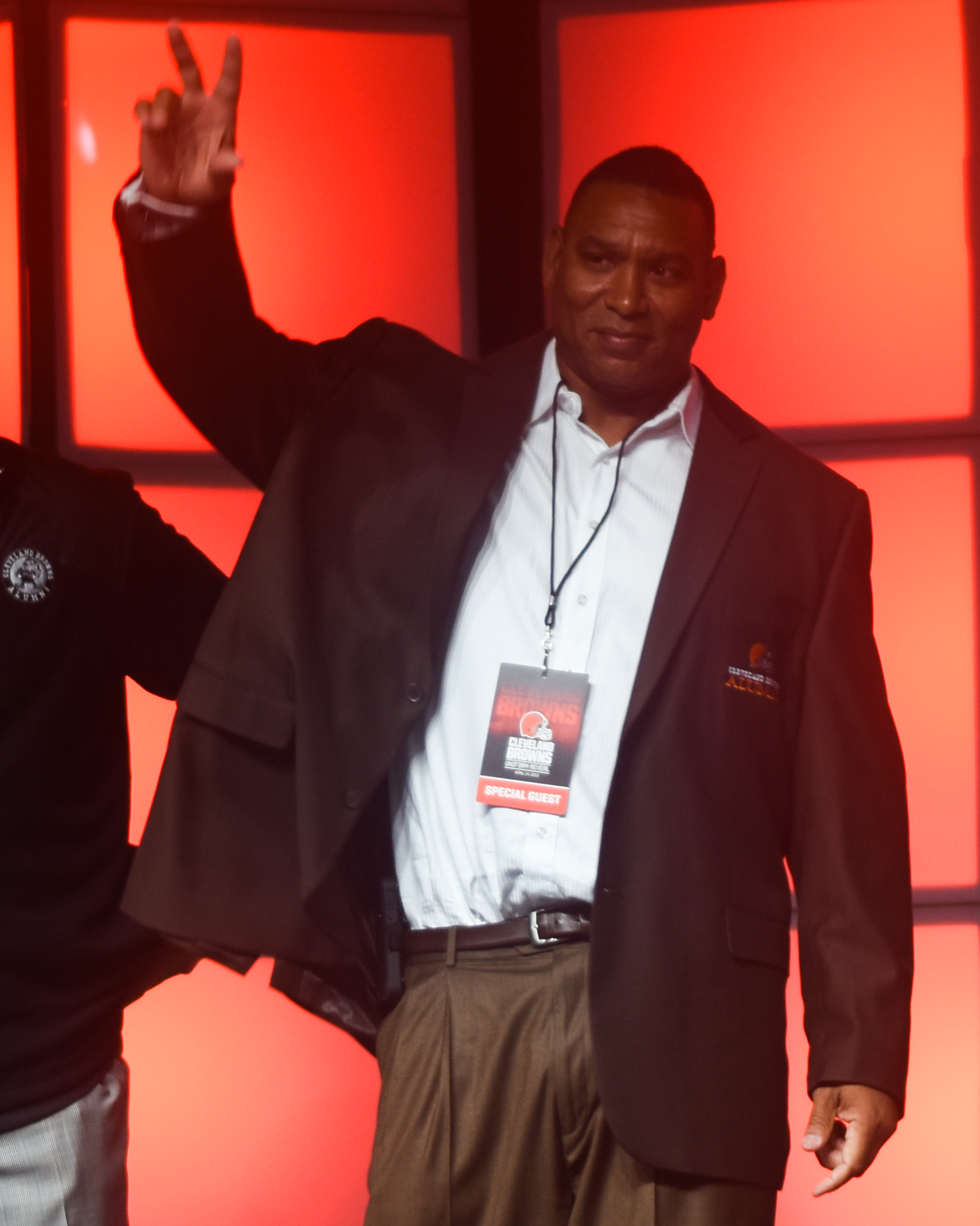
- Thierry in 2015

No. 94, 91, 53, 55
- Position: Defensive end

Personal information
- Born: September 4, 1971; Houston, Texas, U.S.
- Died: November 24, 2017 (aged 46); Opelousas, Louisiana, U.S.
- Listed height: 6 ft 4 in (1.93 m)
- Listed weight: 262 lb (119 kg)

Career information
- High school: Plaisance (Plaisance, Louisiana)
- College: Alcorn State
- NFL draft: 1994: 1st round, 11th overall pick

Career history
- Chicago Bears (1994–1998); Cleveland Browns (1999); Green Bay Packers (2000–2001); Atlanta Falcons (2002)

Career NFL statistics
- Tackles: 212
- Sacks: 33.5
- Fumble recoveries: 7
- Stats at Pro Football Reference

John Fitzgerald Thierry (September 4, 1971 – November 24, 2017) was an American professional football player who was a defensive end in the National Football League (NFL). He was selected by the Chicago Bears in the first round (11th overall pick) of the 1994 NFL draft. A 6-foot-4-inch (1.93 m), 263-pound (119 kg) linebacker from Alcorn State University, Thierry was moved to defensive end and played in nine NFL seasons from 1994 to 2002.

He was selected second in the 1999 Cleveland Browns expansion draft, following Jim Pyne. He finished his career with the Atlanta Falcons after recurring shoulder injuries. During his career Thierry played in 131 games and started 70 of them recording 33.5 sacks and 158 tackles with 7 fumble recoveries.

Thierry died on November 24, 2017, of a heart attack at the age of 46.

== NFL career statistics ==
Legend
| **Bold** | Career high |

| Year | Team | Games | | Tackles | | | | Interceptions | | | | Fumbles | | | |
| Year | Team | GP | GS | Comb | Solo | Ast | Sck | Int | Yds | TD | Lng | FF | FR | Yds | TD |
|---|---|---|---|---|---|---|---|---|---|---|---|---|---|---|---|
| 1994 | CHI | 16 | 1 | 5 | 3 | 2 | 0.0 | 0 | 0 | 0 | 0 | 0 | 0 | 0 | 0 |
| 1995 | CHI | 16 | 7 | 25 | 20 | 5 | 4.0 | 0 | 0 | 0 | 0 | 0 | **4** | 0 | 0 |
| 1996 | CHI | 16 | 2 | 13 | 10 | 3 | 2.0 | 0 | 0 | 0 | 0 | 0 | 0 | 0 | 0 |
| 1997 | CHI | 9 | 9 | 15 | 9 | 6 | 3.0 | 0 | 0 | 0 | 0 | **2** | 0 | 0 | 0 |
| 1998 | CHI | 16 | 9 | 30 | 20 | **10** | 3.5 | **1** | **14** | 0 | **14** | **2** | 0 | 0 | 0 |
| 1999 | CLE | 16 | 10 | 39 | **33** | 6 | **7.0** | **1** | 8 | 0 | 8 | **2** | 0 | 0 | 0 |
| 2000 | GNB | 16 | 16 | **40** | 32 | 8 | 6.5 | 0 | 0 | 0 | 0 | 0 | 0 | 0 | 0 |
| 2001 | GNB | 12 | 12 | 26 | 20 | 6 | 3.5 | 0 | 0 | 0 | 0 | 0 | 2 | 0 | 0 |
| 2002 | ATL | 14 | 4 | 19 | 16 | 3 | 4.0 | 0 | 0 | 0 | 0 | 0 | 1 | 0 | 0 |
| Career | | 131 | 70 | 212 | 163 | 49 | 33.5 | 2 | 22 | 0 | 14 | 6 | 7 | 0 | 0 |
