= Merline =

Merline is a feminine given name. Notable people with the name include:

- Merline Johnson (c. 1910s), American jazz singer
- Merline Pitre (born 1943), American historian
