= Grimble Bell School =

School in St. Landry Parish, Louisiana, U.S. (1830s–1860)

- Washington, St. Landry Parish, Louisiana, United States

Information
- Other name: Grimble Bell School for Free Negroes
- Established: c. 1830s
- Closed: 1860

Grimble Bell School (1830s–1860), was a segregated private school in Washington, Louisiana, United States, for African American students. It was the earliest African American school in the St. Landry Parish, founded in the 1830s, and shut down in 1860 by White vigilantes.

Early educational opportunities for local Black students, like at the Grimble Bell School of the 1830s, were almost exclusively available to only the children of wealthy free people of color. Tuition cost fifteen dollars, and the school had up to 125 students enrolled at its peak. Subjects taught in the classes included history, bookkeeping, arithmetic, writing, English, French, and Latin.

== See also ==
- Opelousas massacre (1868)
