= Opelousas Historic District =

Historic district in Louisiana, United States

- U.S. National Register of Historic Places
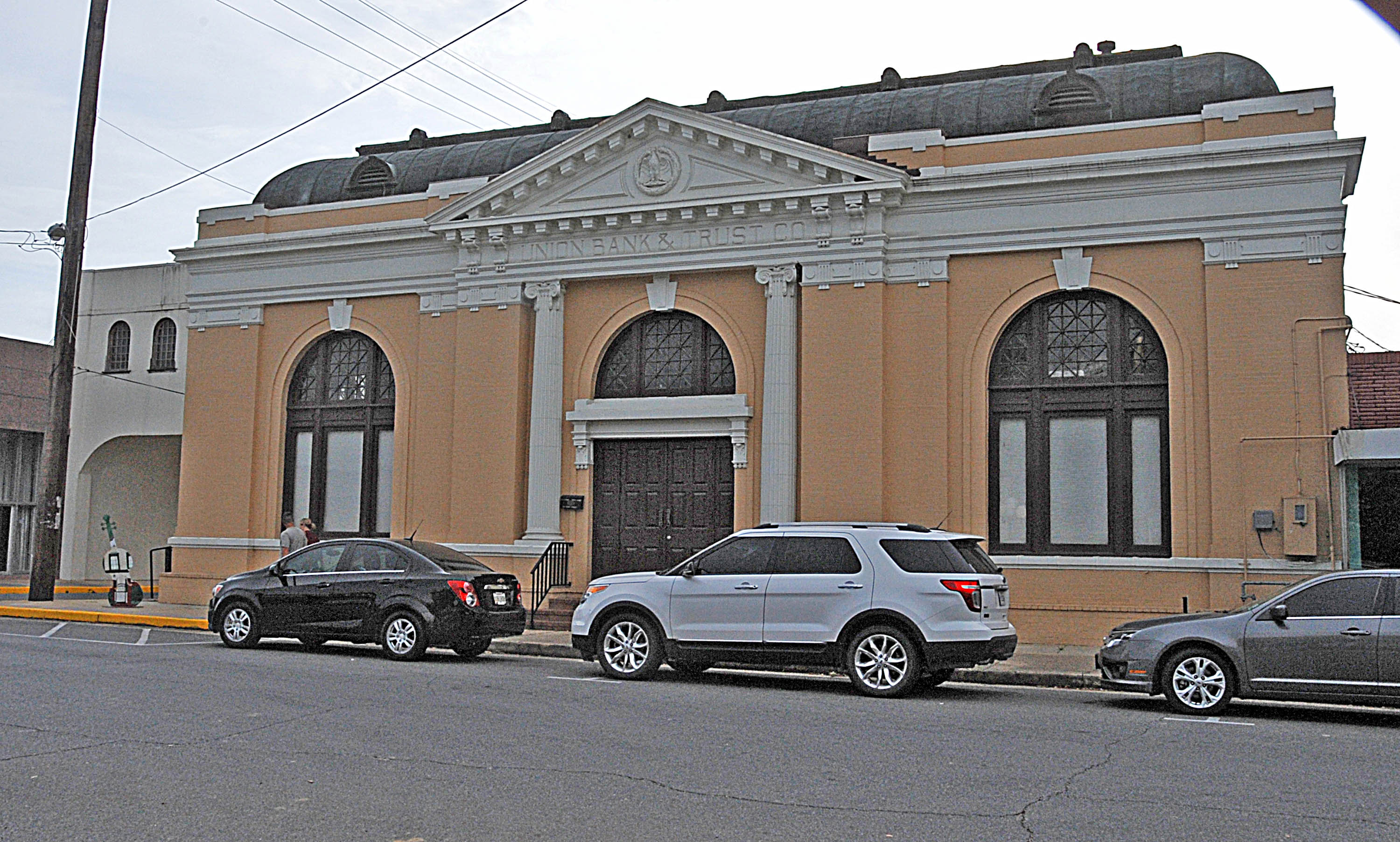
- Union Bank & Trust Building (c.1910), in 2008

- Location within Louisiana
- Location: Roughly bounded by Bellevue, Court St., Landry St., and Market St., Opelousas, Louisiana
- Coordinates: 30°32′01″N 92°05′00″W
- Area: 2 acres (0.81 ha)
- Architectural style: Classical Revival, Greek Revival, Italianate
- NRHP reference No.: 89000477
- Added to NRHP: June 2, 1989

The Opelousas Historic District, in the city of Opelousas in St. Landry Parish, Louisiana is a historic district which was listed on the National Register of Historic Places in 1989. The area is roughly bounded by Bellevue Street, Court Street, Landry Street, and Market Street. It contains 18 contributing buildings in a 2 acres (0.81 ha) area.

== About ==
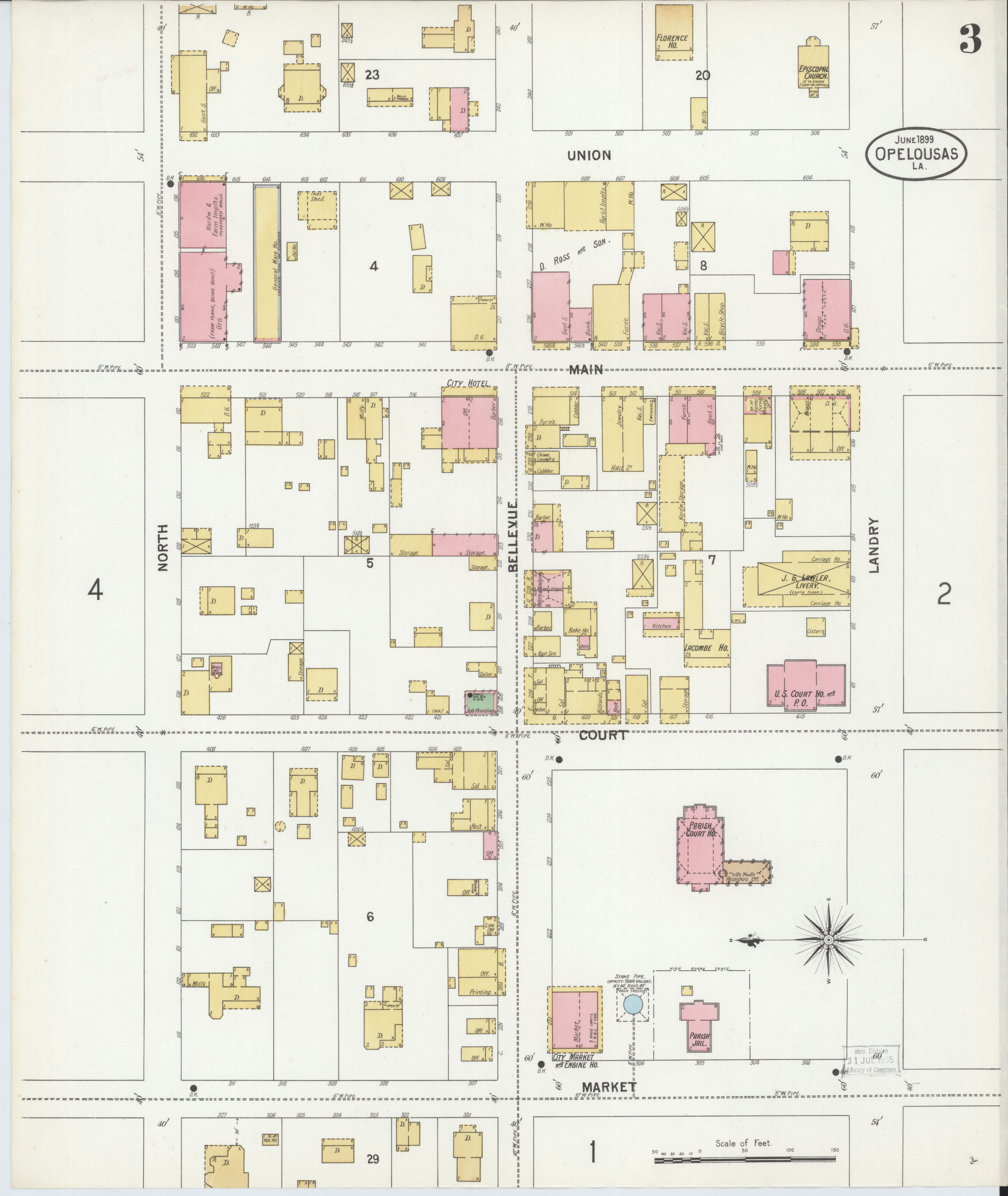
Sanborn map from 1899, showing courthouse square, with smaller footprint of former courthouse

The district architecture styles include Classical revival, Greek revival, Italianate, dating from c.1840 to 1939. Two notable buildings within the district are the Old Federal Building (Opelousas, Louisiana) and the Opelousas City Hall; both of which are separately listed on the National Register.

The Opelousas National Historic District is locally significant in the area of architecture because it is easily the best preserved historic central business district in St. Landry Parish in Louisiana. The district's "anchor is the courthouse square with its huge live oak trees and 1939 Art Deco courthouse. On the northwest corner is the neo-classical Old Opelousas City Hall."

The Landry Street buildings have been renumbered since the 1989 NRHP listing (e.g., the Greek Revival law office, now 129 West Landry, was identified as 153 West Landry in NRHP document).

== List of notable buildings ==
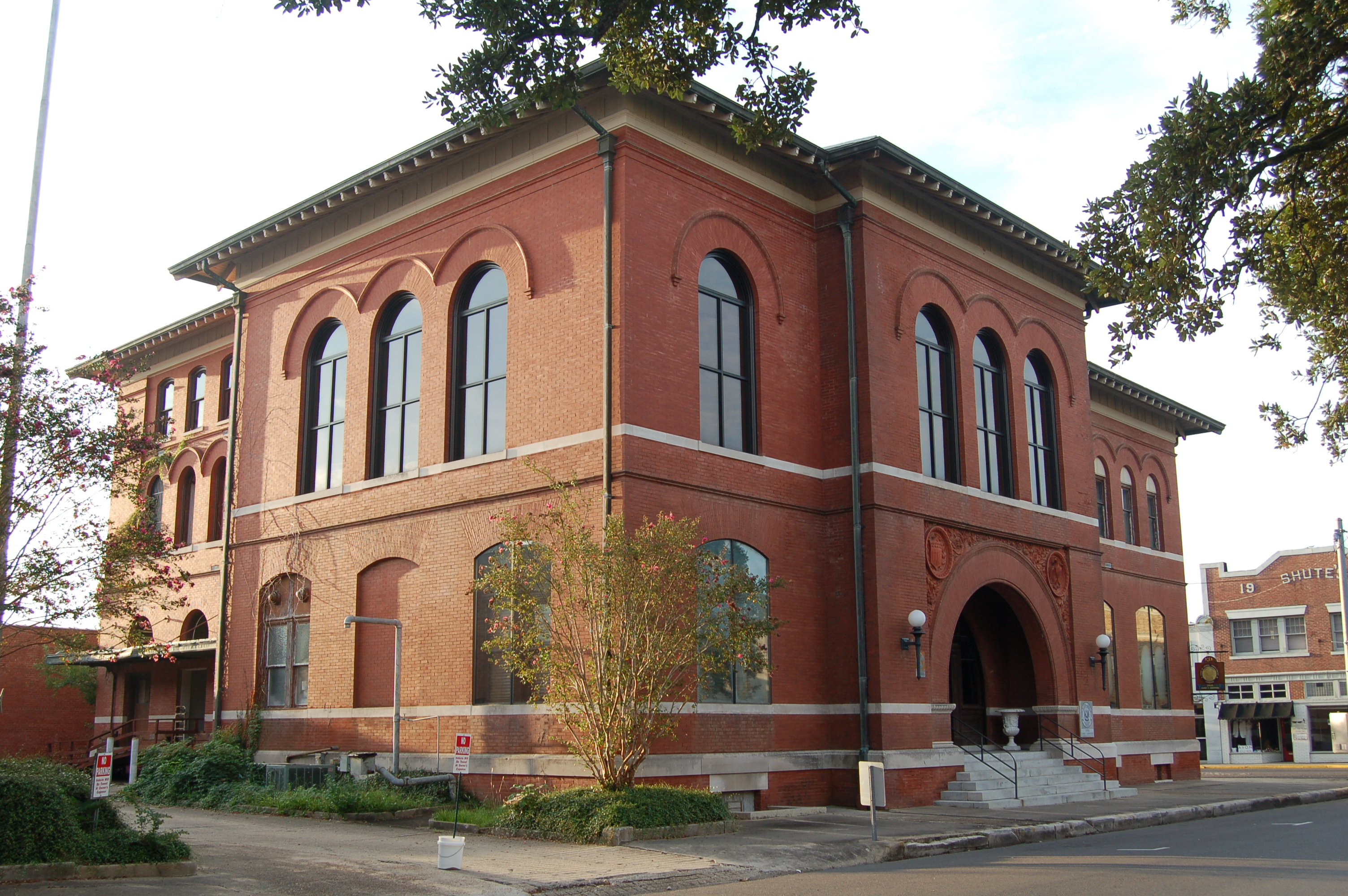
Old Federal Building (1893)

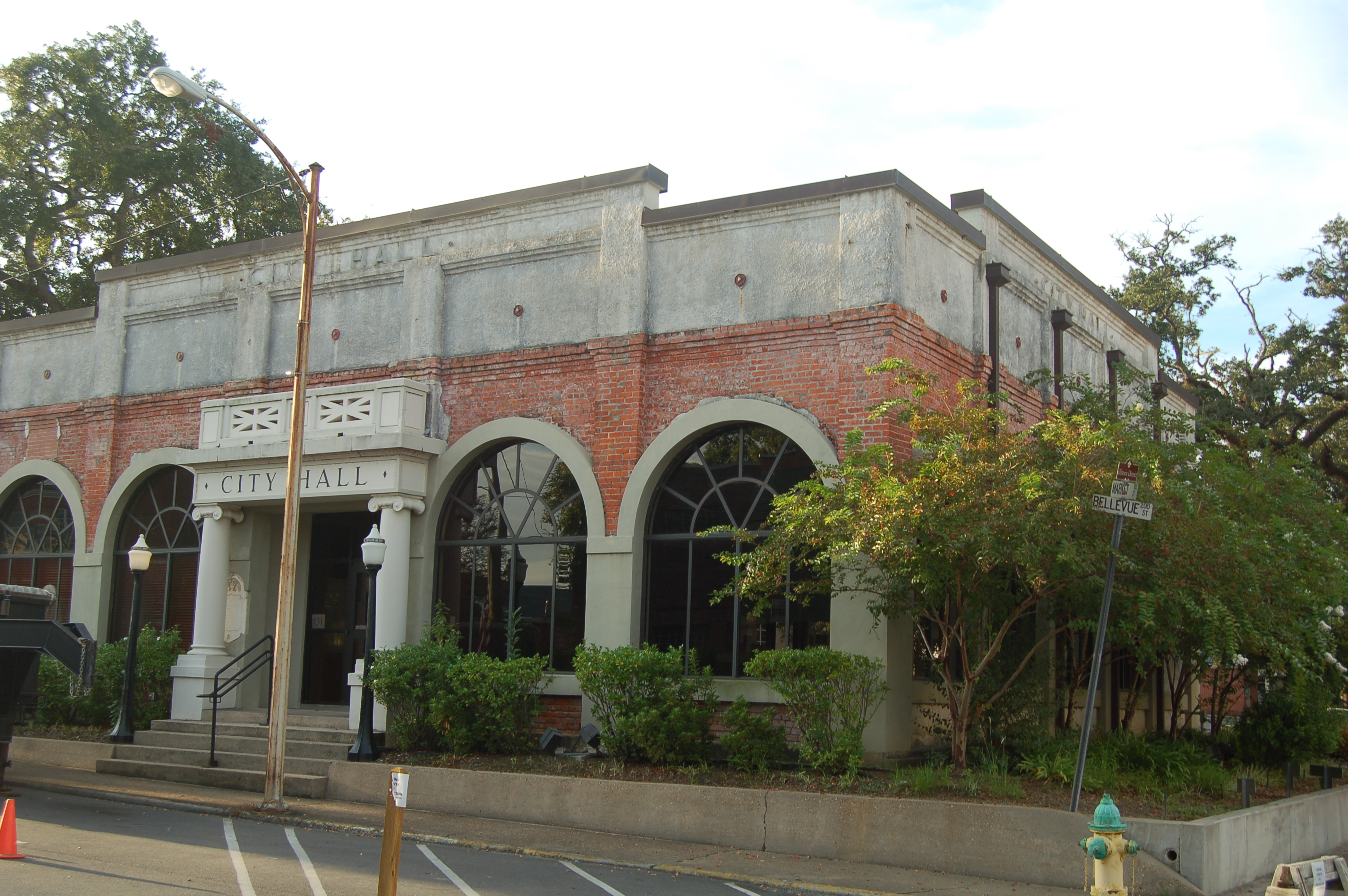
Old Opelousas City Hall (1932)

- St. Landry Parish Courthouse (1939), three-story limestone faced Art Deco building has an above-ground basement and a sleek brushed aluminum spiral staircase on the interior.
- Old Opelousas City Hall (1932), South Market Street and West Bellevue Street at Courthouse Square; NRHP-listed
- Union Bank and Trust (c. 1910 – c. 1912)
- 122 Court Street Building (c. 1930)
- New Drug Store Building (c. 1905)
- Old Federal Building (Opelousas, Louisiana) (1893), 162 South Court Street; NRHP-listed
- Dietlein / Savoy Building (1894), 133 East Landry Street
- 129 East Landry Street (1905)
- 123 East Landry Street (1930)
- Jacobs’ Building (1916–1917), 113–115 East Landry Street
- Shute's Building (1924), corner of Landry and Court Streets
- Parish Bank & Trust Company/Casanova Building (c. 1920)
- Sandoz Building (c. 1890s), 113-117 West Landry Street
- Stander Building (c. 1930), 139–141 West Landry Street
- Greco Building (1930), 145 West Landry Street; formerly Greco Shoe Shop
- 19th Century Law Office (c. 1845), 129 West Landry Street (formerly 153 West Landry)
- Homère Mouton Law Office (c. 1840), 163 West Landry Street; building also served as the Jim Bowie Museum and Tourist Center
- Palace Cafe (c. 1850), 139 West Landry Street; non-contributing
- Gibbs Corner, Court Street and Bellevue Street

== See also ==
- National Register of Historic Places listings in St. Landry Parish, Louisiana
