= Community Rosenwald School =

School near Grand Cane, Louisiana (1929–1969)

- U.S. National Register of Historic Places
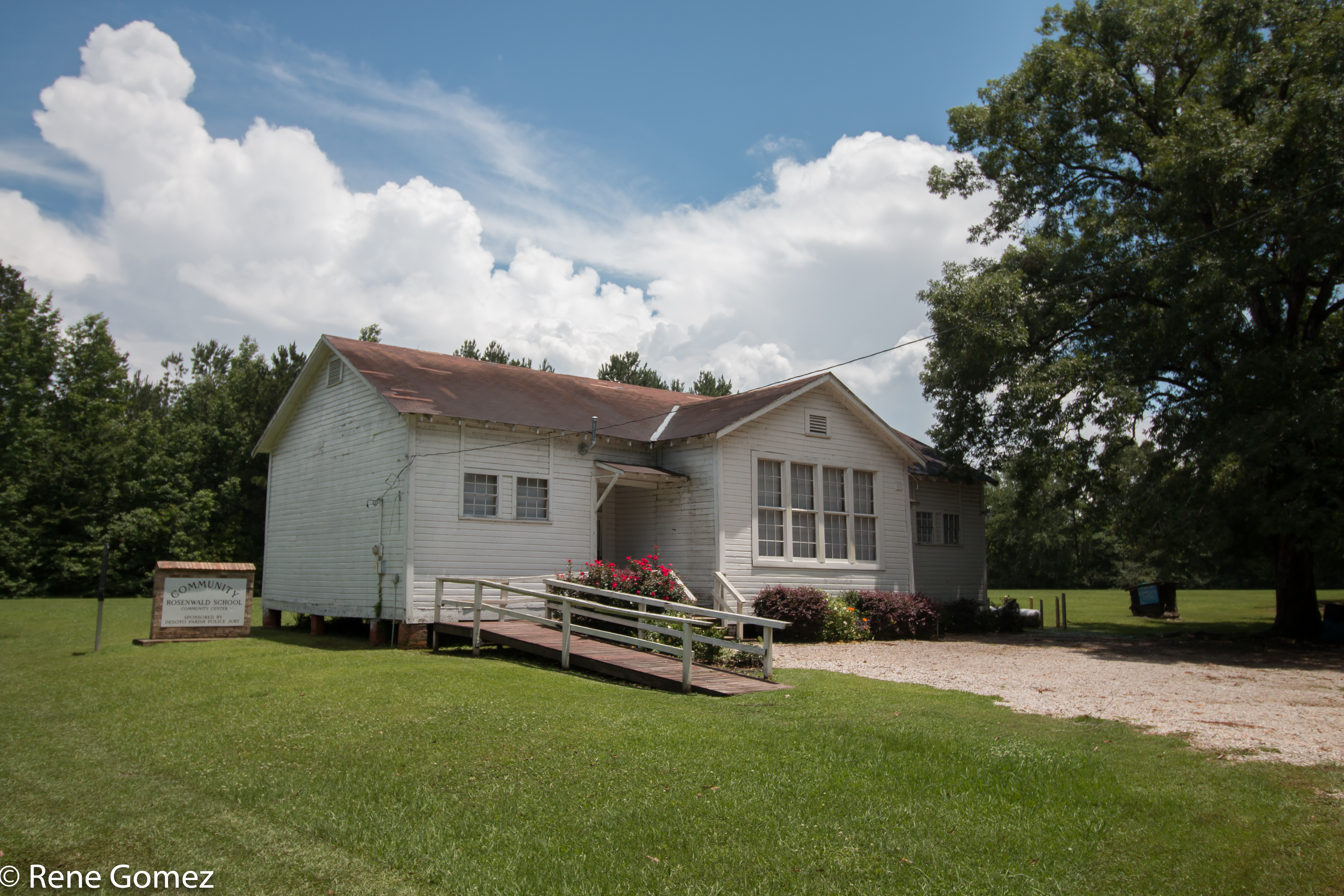

- Location within Louisiana
- Location: Along Louisiana Highway 3015, Holly, DeSoto Parish, Louisiana, U.S.
- Nearest city: Grand Cane, Louisiana
- Coordinates: 32°06′31″N 93°42′46″W
- Area: 2 acres (0.81 ha)
- Built: 1929
- NRHP reference No.: 09000545
- Added to NRHP: July 22, 2009

The Community Rosenwald School (1929–1969) was a two-room Rosenwald school for African American students in Holly, Louisiana, near Grand Cane. It is listed on the National Register of Historic Places since July 22, 2009, for educational and African American history. It was also known as Community Colored Rosenwald School and Grand Cane Community School.

== History ==
Community Rosenwald School was built in the 1928–1929 school year at a total cost of US$3,266, with the Rosenwald fund providing $500; the local African American community raising $550; and $2,216 provided from public sources. It offered classes to students between grade 1 through grade 8.

In the 1943–1944 school year, the enrollment was 122 students, (between all grades), and had three teachers. The Community Rosenwald School was only public elementary school for African American students in the area between 1957 and 1958. It had been part of the Stanley School District.

The state of Louisiana built 393 Rosenwald schools between 1914 and 1932, and as of 2009, only 3 buildings survive (Community Rosenwald School, Longstreet Rosenwald School, and Plaisance School).

== Closure ==
The school was changed in the late 1950s, and was using the name "Grand Cane Community School." It closed by the DeSoto Parish School Board in 1969 due to low enrollment, and issues with bussing. By the 1969–1970 school year, the DeSoto Parish was integrated.

== See also ==
- National Register of Historic Places listings in DeSoto Parish, Louisiana
- List of Rosenwald schools
- Beauregard Parish Training School
