= Venus House =

Historic house in Louisiana, United States

- U.S. National Register of Historic Places
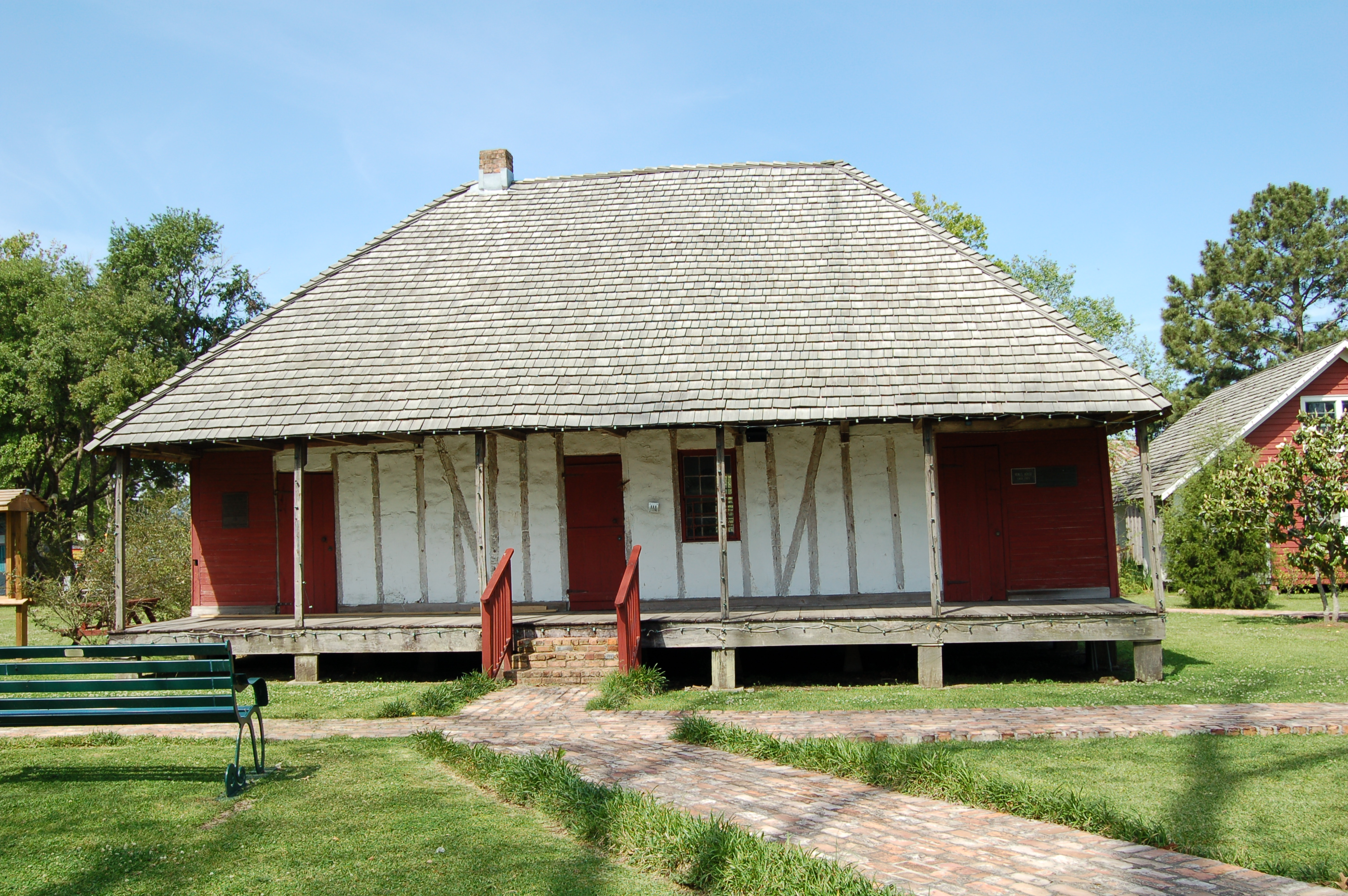
- The house in 2010

- Location within Louisiana
- Location: 828 East Landry Street, Opelousas, Louisiana
- Coordinates: 30°31′52″N 92°04′29″W
- Area: less than one acre
- Built: c. 1791
- Architectural style: Creole
- MPS: Louisiana's French Creole Architecture MPS
- NRHP reference No.: 91000419
- Added to NRHP: April 22, 1991

The Venus House is a historic house located in Opelousas, Louisiana in the United States. The house is named after its former owner and occupant, Marie François Venus, a free Creole woman of color. It is one of the oldest houses of its kind in the Lower Mississippi Valley. Today, the house serves as the centerpiece of Le Vieux Village.

The house was listed on the National Register of Historic Places on April 22, 1991.

== History ==
Built circa 1791, the house is the former home of Marie François Venus, a free Creole woman of color. Originally located in the small community of Grand Prairie, the house features bousillage construction, a natural insulation once common in Cajun and Creole dwellings. Typically made by mixing mud with spanish moss or animal hair, it was held in place by wooden bars (barreaux) set between the posts, forming the walls. Originally built using mortise and tenon joinery, it showcases traditional construction techniques.

== See also ==
- National Register of Historic Places listings in St. Landry Parish, Louisiana
