= Lafayette Frederick =

American mycologist (1923–2018)

- Dr. Frederick, Emeritus Professor of Biology at Howard University
- Born: 9 March 1923; Dog Bog, Mississippi
- Died: 29 December 2018 (aged 95); Tuskegee, Alabama
- Education: Tuskegee Institute; University of Rhode Island; Washington State University
- Children: Lew Frederick
- Scientific career
- Fields: Mycology
- Workplaces: Southern University; Atlanta University; Howard University
- Doctoral advisor: Charles Gardner Shaw
- Notable students: O'Neil Ray Collins
- Author abbrev. (botany): Frederick

Lafayette Frederick (9 March 1923 - 29 December 2018) was an American plant pathologist, mycologist, and specialist in myxomycete ecology and systematics.

== Biography ==
Frederick was born in Dog Bog, a rural town near Friars Point, Mississippi. He grew up in Missouri.

In 1943, Frederick earned his bachelor's degree at the Tuskegee Institute in Alabama. He pursued graduate work at the University of Hawaii before earning his master's degree in botany at the University of Rhode Island in 1950. He earned his PhD at Washington State University under Charles Gardner Shaw.

Frederick joined the biology department at Southern University, before becoming chair of the Department of Biology at Atlanta University. He later joined the Department of Botany at Howard University in 1976, where he worked before retiring in 1993.

Frederick served as vice president of the Association of Southeastern Biologists from 1984 to 1985, and as president from 1985 to 1986.

== Legacy ==
The Lafayette Frederick Underrepresented Minorities Scholarship is a scholarship given by the Association of Southeastern Biologists.

Harold St. John named the species Cyrtandra frederickii in his honor.
