= Constantine John Alexopoulos =

American mycologist (1907–1986)

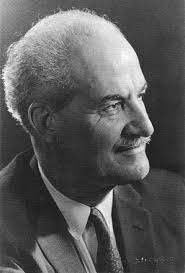
- Born: March 17, 1907; Chicago, Illinois, U.S.
- Died: May 15, 1986 (aged 79); Austin, Texas, U.S.
- Education: University of Illinois
- Spouse: Juliet Drowdy
- Scientific career
- Workplaces: University of Texas at Austin, University of Iowa, Michigan State University, Kent State University, University of Illinois

Constantine John Alexopoulos (March 17, 1907 – May 15, 1986) was an American mycologist. He was the main author of the landmark book Introductory Mycology, commonly used in mycology and mycology-related courses in undergrad and grad schools around the globe. Introductory Mycology was translated into five languages.

== Education ==
Although born in the United States of America, Alexopoulos studied in Athens until the beginning of high school, when he returned to his birthplace of Chicago in October 1919. Alexopoulos had to move to Greece at an early age to accompany his deployed father who joined the Greek army in the Balkan Wars. After returning to the US, Alexopoulos finished high school at Lane Technical High School and already showed interest in plants. From this interest, his career choice arose and he started horticulture at the University of Illinois in 1923. His master studies were focused on "the cytology of microsporogenesis of raspberry hybrids". Alexopoulos received his M.Sc. degree in 1928. Alexopoulos got a Ph.D. degree in 1932 based on his research entitled "Pycnidial Fungi from Vitis".

== Career ==
Alexopoulos obtained his Ph.D. degree at the beginning of the Great Depression, a period of unprecedented economic crisis in the US. After his former Ph.D. advisor Frank Lincoln Stevens had a heart attack, Alexopoulos started to work as a full-time instructor teaching classes in mycology from 1934 to 1935, when he was hired by Kent State University (KSU) as an instructor in Biology. During this job, Alexopoulos met his soon-to-be wife Juliet Dowdy. After KSU, Alexopoulos worked in Greece at the Institute of Chemistry and Agriculture, and in Brazil at the Rubber Development Corporation. In 1947, Alexopoulos started working at Michigan State University (MSU), where he published the first edition of Introductory Mycology in 1952. He worked as a full professor at MSU from 1952 to 1956, when he moved to the University of Iowa. In 1962, Alexopoulos took a position as a faculty member at University of Texas at Austin, where he spent the rest of his career, and where he died. In 1939 he married Juliet Dowdy, a music instructor.

== Scientific production and contribution ==
Alexopoulos identified and named several species like Echinostelium elachiston, Echinostelium cribrarioides, Physarella oblonga f. alba, and higher taxa, such as Acrasiogymnomycotina. He participated in 85 publications during his life, half of which focused on Myxomycetes. A list of his most notable publications is shown below. Besides the utmost important Introductory Mycology, his work in collaboration with Storck regarding Fungi DNA was also extremely important, as one of the pioneers in comparing the proportion of guanine and cytosine content of Fungi DNA for taxonomic purposes

=== Papers and reviews ===
- Taxonomic studies in the Myxomycetes .5. Significance of peridial and spore ornamentations in the genus Tubifera, with a revised key to the species. Nelson, RK; Scheetz, RW; Alexopoulos, CJ Mycologia volume: 74 issue: 4 pages: 541-548 published: 1982
- Deoxyribonucleic acid of fungi. Storck, R; Alexopoulos, CJ. Bacteriological reviews volume: 34 issue: 2 pages: 126-+ published: 1970
- The Myxomycetes II. Alexopoulos, CJ. Botanical review volume: 29 issue: 1 pages: 1-78 published: 1963
- Gross morphology of the plasmodium and its possible significance in the relationships among the Myxomycetes. Alexopoulos, CJ. Mycologia volume: 52 issue: 1 pages: 1-20 published: 1960
- Nucleotide composition of deoxyribonucleic acid of some species of Cryptococcus rhodotorula and Sporobolomyces. Storck, R; Alexopoulos, CJ; Phaff, HJ. Journal of Bacteriology volume: 98 issue: 3 pages: 1069-+ published: 1969

=== Books ===
- Introductory Mycology. Alexopoulos, CJ; Mims, CW. 1952. John Wiley & Sons, First Edition.
- The Myxomycetes. Martin, GW; Alexopoulos, CJ. 1969. Univ. Iowa Press
- Algae and Fungi. Alexopoulos, CJ. 1967. New York, Macmillan

== Academic connections ==
Alexopoulos had 40 students during his academic life, including Master's, doctoral and post-doctoral students. Among these students was Meredith Blackwell, an emerita Professor at the Louisiana State University who focuses on fungi associated with arthropods, and mycologist O'Neil Ray Collins. On the upper branches of Alexopoulos' "scientific genealogic tree" lies the Heinrich Anton De Bary known as the Father of Plant Pathology.

== Memberships, positions and awards ==
Alexopoulos' career granted him recognition by many different organizations around the globe. Alexopoulos received honors such as the Fulbright research fellow (1954) by the University of Athens, Distinguished Mycologist (1981) and W.H. Weston Award for Teaching Excellence in Mycology by the Mycological Society of America (1983). The Mycological Society of America annually rewards mycologists in their early career with the C.J. Alexopoulos Prize, in recognition of their outstanding work. Alexopoulos was the last mycologist to be the President of the Botanical Society of America, a landmark of the connection loss between these two fields of science.
