= J. Whitfield Gibbons =

American herpetologist, author, and educator (born 1939)

J. Whitfield "Whit" Gibbons (born October 5, 1939) is an American herpetologist, author, and educator. He is Professor Emeritus of Ecology, University of Georgia, and former Head of the Environmental Outreach and Education program at the Savannah River Ecology Laboratory (SREL).

== Life and work ==
Gibbons was born in Montgomery, Alabama. He is the son of the late Dr. Robert F. Gibbons, professor and novelist, and the late Janie Moore Gibbons, professor at the University of Alabama. He received degrees in biology from the University of Alabama (B.S.-1961; M.S.-1963) and in zoology from Michigan State University (Ph.D. - 1967).

He is the author or editor of 25 books on herpetology and ecology and has published more than 250 articles in scientific journals. He has had commentaries on National Public Radio (Living on Earth, Science Friday, and others), and has had more than 1,000 popular articles on ecology published in magazines and newspapers, including a weekly newspaper column featuring environmental issues for more than 30 years. He has authored more than 100 encyclopedia articles on ecology that have appeared in World Book, Compton's and Encyclopedia Britannica. He also wrote an updated, revised edition of the merit badge booklet titled "Reptile and Amphibian Study" for the Boy Scouts of America.

His research interests and publications have focused on the population dynamics and ecology of aquatic and semi-aquatic vertebrates and have involved detailed population studies of fish, amphibians, and reptiles, particularly turtles. One objective has been to determine functional relationships between population parameters (e.g., survivorship, reproductive output, dispersal rate) and environmental conditions, including documenting and explaining the distribution and abundance patterns of herpetofauna. The ultimate goals have been to explain findings at the ecological and evolutionary levels. An emphasis has been placed on application of basic research to environmental impact and conservation issues, particularly in regard to natural and degraded wetlands. Gibbons was the co-founder of Partners in Amphibian and Reptile Conservation (PARC) in 1999.

Gibbons received the Distinguished Herpetologist Award and the Henry Fitch Distinguished Herpetologist Award at the national/international Joint Meeting of Ichthyologists and Herpetologists for long-term excellence in the study of amphibian and reptile biology. He was awarded the IUCN Behler Turtle Conservation Award in recognition of long-term turtle research and conservation nationally and internationally. Other awards include the Southeastern Outdoor Press Association's First Place Award for the Best Radio Program and Best Weekly Newspaper Column, the South Carolina Governor's Award for Environmental Education, the Meritorious Teaching Award presented by the Association of Southeastern Biologists (ASB), the ASB Senior Research Award, and the C. W. Watson Award presented by the Southeastern Association of Fish and Wildlife Agencies for contributions to wildlife conservation.

A species of turtle, Graptemys gibbonsi, is named in his honor.

== Books ==
- Snakes of the Eastern United States. 2017. University of Georgia Press, Athens, GA.
- Ecoviews Too. 2017. (with Anne Gibbons). University of Alabama Press.
- Snakes of the Southeast. 2nd Edition. 2015 (with Mike Dorcas). University of Georgia Press. Athens, GA. Winner of the National Outdoor Book Award.
- Their Blood Runs Cold: Adventures with Reptiles and Amphibians. 30th Anniversary Edition. 2013. University of Alabama Press.
- Frogs: The Animal Answer Guide. 2011. (with Mike Dorcas). Johns Hopkins University Press, Baltimore.
- Keeping All the Pieces. 2010. University of Georgia Press, Athens, GA.
- Salamanders of the Southeast. 2010. (with Joe Mitchell). University of Georgia Press. Athens, GA.
- Turtles: The Animal Answer Guide. 2009. (with Judy Greene). Johns Hopkins University Press.
- Lizards and Crocodilians of the Southeast. 2009. (with Judy Greene and Tony Mills). University of Georgia Press, Athens, GA.
- Frogs and Toads of the Southeast. 2008. (with Mike Dorcas). University of Georgia Press, Athens, GA.
- Turtles of the Southeast. 2008. (with K. Buhlmann and T. Tuberville). University of Georgia Press, Athens, GA.
- Snakes of the Southeast. 2005. (with Mike Dorcas). University of Georgia Press, Athens, GA. Winner of National Outdoor Book Award
- North American Watersnakes: A Natural History. 2004. (with Mike Dorcas). University of Oklahoma Press
- Ecoviews: Snakes, Snails, and Environmental Tales. 1998. (with Anne Gibbons). University of Alabama Press. Choice Outstanding Academic Book award.
- Life History and Ecology of the Slider Turtle. 1990. Smithsonian Institution Press.
- Their Blood Runs Cold: Adventures with Reptiles and Amphibians. 1983. University of Alabama Press.
