= Rebecca Sharitz =

Professor

- Born: 10 August 1944; Wytheville, Virginia
- Died: 20 October 2018 (aged 74)
- Spouse: Carl Byrne Hatfield
- Awards: National Wetlands Award in Science Research, Environmental Law Institute (2010); Fellow Award, Society of Wetland Scientists (2008)

Academic background
- Education: University of North Carolina at Chapel Hill (PhD); Roanoke College (B.S.)
- Doctoral advisor: Frank McCormick

Academic work
- Discipline: Ecology
- Sub-discipline: Wetland ecology
- Institutions: Saginaw Valley State University (1970-71); University of Georgia (1972-2018)

Rebecca R. Sharitz (1944-2018) was an emeritus professor at the University of Georgia who spent the majority of her career as a senior researcher in the UGA's Savannah River Ecology Laboratory. Her research centered on wetlands and their ecological functions with a focus on river floodplains, swamp forests, and Carolina Bays.

== Early life and education ==
Rebecca Sharitz was born in Wytheville, Virginia. In 1966, she received her B.S. in Botany at Roanoke College in Salem, Virginia. She continued her education at the University of North Carolina at Chapel Hill completing her Ph.D. in Ecology in 1970.

== Career and research ==
Sharitz began her career as an Assistant Professor of Biology at Saginaw Valley State University (1970-71), but the majority of her professional life was spent working at the University of Georgia (1972-2018). In addition to her role as a research ecologist in the Savannah River Ecology Laboratory, she also served as a professor of Botany, Plant Biology, and Ecology while at the University of Georgia.

Sharitz researched ecological processes in wetlands focusing predominantly on wetlands in the southeastern U.S. Her long research career included investigations of wetland responses to natural and anthropogenic disturbances, like thermal pollution, as well as work on the restoration of degraded wetlands and the conservation of rare species. Some notable findings in Sharitz's research were the discoveries of links between wetland forest regeneration and flooding due to storm events, dam alterations, and hydrologic discharge from nuclear reactors. Specifically, regeneration was reduced after such events, such as with Taxodium distichum having reduced growth after hydrologic disruptions from dam alterations as well as reduced diversity in tree species of the Congaree Swamp due to hurricane damages.

During her time as a professor, she oversaw over 100 volunteers, 30 graduate students, and 13 postdoctoral fellows.

== Honors & awards ==
Throughout her career, Sharitz received various awards and recognitions for her research and teaching. Notable honors and awards are listed below:

- Fellow of the Ecological Society of America, 2012
- National Wetlands Award in Science Research, Environmental Law Institute (2010)
- Fellow Award, Society of Wetland Scientists (2008)
- Vice President, International Association for Ecology (2002-05)
- Committee Member, National Academy of Sciences Committee on Restoration of the Greater Everglades Ecosystem (1999)
- Meritorious Teaching Award, Association of Southeastern Biologists (1997)
- Vice President, Ecological Society of America (1990-91)
- President, Association of Southeastern Biologists (1987)

Posthumously, Sharitz's family developed a fellowship to honor Sharitz and her late husband Carl Byrne Hatfield, who worked at the U.S. Department of Energy's Savannah River Site. The Dr. Rebecca Reyburn Sharitz and Carl Byrne Hatfield Fellowship Fund provides financial support to PhD candidates at the University of Georgia focused on ecology or plant biology.

=== Selected publications ===
- Ecology of freshwater and estuarine wetlands. Darold P. Batzer, Rebecca R. Sharitz (2nd ed.). Oakland, California. 2014. ISBN 978-0-520-95911-8. OCLC 892239067.
- King, Sammy L.; Sharitz, Rebecca R.; Groninger, John W.; Battaglia, Loretta L. (2009). "The ecology, restoration, and management of southeastern floodplain ecosystems: A synthesis". Wetlands. 29 (2): 624–634. doi:10.1672/08-223.1. ISSN 1943-6246. S2CID 25051504.
- Sharitz, Rebecca R. (2003-09-01). "Carolina bay wetlands: Unique habitats of the southeastern United States". Wetlands. 23 (3): 550–562. doi:10.1672/0277-5212(2003)023[0550:CBWUHO]2.0.CO;2. ISSN 1943-6246. S2CID 19954348.
- De Steven, Diane, & Sharitz, Rebecca R. (1997). "Differential recovery of a deepwater swamp forest across a gradient of disturbance intensity". Wetlands. 17 (4): 476–484. doi.org/10.1007/BF03161513.
- Putz, Francis E., & Sharitz, Rebecca R. (1991). "Hurricane damage to old-growth forest in Congaree Swamp National Monument, South Carolina, U.S.A." Canadian Journal of Forest Research. 21 (12): 1765–1770. doi.org/10.1139/x91-244.
