= Merline Pitre =

American historian and educator (born 1943)

- Born: April 10, 1943 (age 83); Opelousas, Louisiana, U.S.

Academic background
- Education: Temple University
- Thesis: Frederick Douglass : a party loyalist, 1870-1895 (1976)

Merline Pitre (born April 10, 1943) is an American historian and educator. She is a professor of history at Texas Southern University and previously served as president of the Texas State Historical Association in 2011 and 2012.

== Life and career ==
Pitre was born on April 10, 1943, in Opelousas, Louisiana, to parents Florence W. Pitre (d. 2014) and Robert Pitre. She grew up in the Louisiana Plaisance community and graduated as valedictorian from Plaisance High School in 1962. She received a B.S. in French from Southern University and an M.A. in French from Atlanta University. She received another M.A. degree and Ph.D. at Temple University in Philadelphia, Pennsylvania in 1972 and 1976, respectively.

For three years, Pitre was a teacher at St. Augustine College in Raleigh, North Carolina. She conducted research at the Library of Congress, National Archives, and the Frederick Douglass Memorial Home. In 1981, she was the recipient of a National Endowment for the Humanities Fellowship, which awarded a stipend for independent research.

In 1983, Pitre became the associate dean of the College of Liberal Arts and Behavioral Sciences at Texas Southern University, a position she held until 1985. Between 1990 and 1994, as well as between 2000 and 2008, she served as the dean of the College of Liberal Arts and Behavioral Sciences.

From 2011 to 2012, she served as the president of the Texas State Historical Association.

In 2007 and 2012, she received the Liz Carpenter Best Book on the History of Women Award from the Texas State Historical Association for her books Black Women in Texas History (with Bruce Glasrud) and Southern Black Women in the Modern Civil Rights Movement (with Bruce Glasrud), respectively. In 2014, she was awarded the Lorraine Williams Leadership Award from the Association of Black Women Historians and the President Achievement Award from Texas Southern University.

== Writings ==
- Pitre, Merline (2016). Through many dangers, toils and snares : black leadership in Texas, 1868-1898 (Revised ed.). College Station: Texas A & M University Press. ISBN 978-1-62349-483-4. OCLC 957312510.
- Pitre, Merline (1999). In struggle against Jim Crow : Lulu B. White and the NAACP, 1900-1957 (1st ed.). College Station, Tex.: Texas A & M University Press. ISBN 0-585-38784-2. OCLC 49569076.
- Black women in Texas history. Bruce A. Glasrud, Merline Pitre, Angela Boswell (1st ed.). College Station, Tex.: Texas A & M University Press. 2008. ISBN 978-1-60344-409-5. OCLC 607809297.
- Pitre, Merline (2018). Born to serve : a history of Texas Southern University. Norman. ISBN 978-0-8061-6161-7. OCLC 1030892976.
