= O'Neil Ray Collins =

American mycologist (1931–1989)

- Collins in 1975
- Born: March 9, 1931; Plaisance, Louisiana, US
- Died: April 8, 1989 (aged 58); Orinda, California, US
- Education: Southern University; University of Iowa
- Scientific career
- Fields: Mycology
- Workplaces: Queens College; Southern University; Wayne State University; University of California, Berkeley
- Thesis: Heterothallism and Homothallism in Two Myxomycetes (1961)
- Doctoral advisor: Constantine J. Alexopoulos

O'Neil Ray Collins (March 9, 1931 – April 8, 1989) was an American botanist, mycologist and specialist in slime-mold genetics.

== Early life ==
Collins was born in Plaisance, Louisiana, on March 9, 1931, and graduated from the local high school in 1948. After serving the United States Army in Europe, he earned his Bachelor of Science degree in botany in January 1957 from Southern University. His interest in mycology was cultivated by Lafayette Frederick, a professor at Southern. Collins later attended the University of Iowa and studied under Constantine J. Alexopoulos, receiving his master's in 1959 and doctorate in 1961. His thesis involved the study of slime-molds in the genera Physarum and Didymium.

== Career ==
In 1961, Collins began his teaching career at Queens College. He concurrently conducted research on Didymium with Ian Kenneth Ross at Yale. Collins accepted a faculty position at Southern University in 1963, and in 1965, he moved to Wayne State University in Detroit.

In 1968, Collins became the first black faculty member in the Botany Department of the University of California, Berkeley. He was Associate Dean of the Graduate Division and helped develop the Graduate Minority Program. He became a Miller Research Professor in 1974, and served as Chairman of the Department of Botany from 1976 to 1981.

Collins died on April 8, 1989, aged 58, in Orinda, California. At the time of his death, he was the only African-American biologist to have held a tenured position at Berkeley.
