= Mary Gaulden Jagger =

American geneticist (1921-2007)

Mary Esther Gaulden Jagger (April 30, 1921 – September 1, 2007), known professionally as Mary Esther Gaulden, was an American radiation geneticist, professor of radiology and political activist who authored some 60 scientific publications.

== Early life ==
Mary Esther Gaulden was the daughter of Daniel Harley Gaulden, Sr. and Virginia Carson Gaulden. She earned a Bachelor of Science degree from Winthrop College, where she double-majored in music and biology, and later earned her doctorate in biology at the University of Virginia.

== Oak Ridge ==
In 1949, she began working as a senior radiation biologist in the Biology Division of the Oak Ridge National Laboratory in Oak Ridge, Tennessee under Alexander Hollaender. There, in 1956, she met biophysicist John Jagger, whom she married 19 October 1956. While working in Oak Ridge, Gaulden Jagger became locally famous as the person who "threw the rascals out" of the Anderson County Election Commission, and was also active in the county's desegregation movement, participating in drugstore and restaurant sit-ins alongside her husband. Gaulden was a founding member of the Radiation Research Society and the Environmental Mutagen Society and was president of the Association of Southeastern Biologists in 1959.

== UT Southwestern Medical Center ==
In the mid-1960s, the couple and their two young children relocated to Dallas, Texas. Gaulden took a position as a professor of radiology at the UT Southwestern Medical Center, where she retired in 1992. In 1966 she was a co-founder of the National Organization for Women.

Gaulden served on the Committee on Toxicology of the U.S. National Research Council from 1989 to 1999, studying (among other things) the environment on the International Space Station.

== Awards ==
- She was given a plaque by the alumni of the Dept. of Radiology, Southwestern Medical School, for the years 1967-1977.

- In 1982 she was given the Academia Award as the Best Lecturer in Genetics by the Freshman Medical School Class.

- In the nonscientific arena, she also distinguished herself. In Oak Ridge, she became locally famous as the person who "threw the rascals out" of the Anderson County Election Commission, and was also active in the desegregation movement in that county. In recognition of these activities, the Oak Ridge legal community gave her the Liberty Bell Award for 1963.

- In 1983, she was given the Maura McNiel Award (Women Helping Women) by the Women's Center of Dallas.
