= Association of Southeastern Biologists =

Scientific professional organization

- Abbreviation: ASB
- Formation: 1937
- Legal status: nonprofit organization
- Purpose: "To promote Biology through research and education.".
- Region served: Southeastern United States
- Members: ~ 1000
- President: Holly Boettger-Tong (2023-2025)
- Vice President: Heather Joesting (2023-2024)
- Website: sebiologists.org

The Association of Southeastern Biologists (ASB) is a scientific professional organization in the southeastern United States focused on promoting research and education across the biological sciences. The ASB hosts an annual meeting featuring paper and poster sessions, workshops, and symposia across a variety of biological disciplines. The ASB also issues the yearly publication Southeastern Biology.

== History ==
The ASB was established in 1937 at a meeting at the University of Georgia. With the exception of the years during World War II (1943–1945) and the COVID-19 global pandemic (2020), the ASB has held annual meetings since its establishment. Among the founding purposes of the ASB were to promote a greater unity and cooperation among those engaged in biological work in the southeast and to promote the study and preservation of the biological resources of the southeastern United States.

Throughout its history, the ASB has drafted several resolutions to address issues in biological research and education in the southeastern United States and beyond. Issues addressed in ASB resolutions include the support for the establishment of the National Science Foundation, clarifying the teaching load for science educators, and support for the teaching of evolution in the classroom.

The ASB is registered as a nonprofit organization.

== Annual meeting ==
The ASB hosts an annual meeting each spring in different cities across the southeastern United States. Meetings typically consist of a plenary lecture, two days of talks and posters, a social, field trips, and an awards banquet. Educational and research institutions near the host city of an annual meeting may serve as host institutions. Host institutions may provide meeting space, conference resources, and/or welcome addresses to the meeting attendees. The ASB annual meeting therefore provides an important venue for institutions in a southeastern city to communicate their contributions to the biological sciences to a large regional audience.

Recent ASB annual meeting host cities have included: Concord, NC (2016), Montgomery, AL (2017), Myrtle Beach, SC (2018), and Memphis, TN (2019). The 2020 meeting annual meeting was scheduled to take place in Jacksonville, FL, but was canceled due to the COVID-19 pandemic. The ASB's 2021 meeting was held virtually.

The ASB annual meeting also serves as venue for national associations to meet. Affiliated associations and groups that often meet in conjunction with the ASB during the annual meeting include the Southern Appalachian Botanical Society, the Botanical Society of America Southeast Section, Beta Beta Beta (Southeastern Districts), the Ecological Society of America Southeastern Chapter, the Partnership for Undergraduate Life Science Education, and the Society of Herbarium Curators. Awards from the ASB and affiliate associations are presented at an awards banquet on the final night of the meeting

== Former presidents and vice-presidents ==
The following persons of note have been president or vice-presidents of the society:

- Mary Stuart MacDougall – vice-president (1940–1941); president (1942–1946)
- Eugene P. Odum – vice-president (1948–1949)
- Horton H. Hobbs, Jr. – vice-president (1957–1958); president (1959–1960)
- Mary Gaulden Jagger – president (1958–1959)
- Elsie Quarterman – vice-president (1964–1965); president (1966–1967)
- Wilbur H. Duncan – vice-president (1966–1967)
- Lafayette Frederick – vice president (1984–1985); president (1985–1986)
- Rebecca Sharitz – president (1987)
- J. Whitfield Gibbons – president (1997–1998)

== Publications ==
- Southeastern Biology – The official bulletin of the ASB, published quarterly
- Southeastern Naturalist – An official journal of the ASB, published quarterly by Eagle Hill Publications
- Eastern Biologist – An official journal of the ASB, published by Eagle Hill Publications
