= Plaisance School =

School in Louisiana, United States

- U.S. National Register of Historic Places
- Plaisance Rosenwald School; Plaisance High School
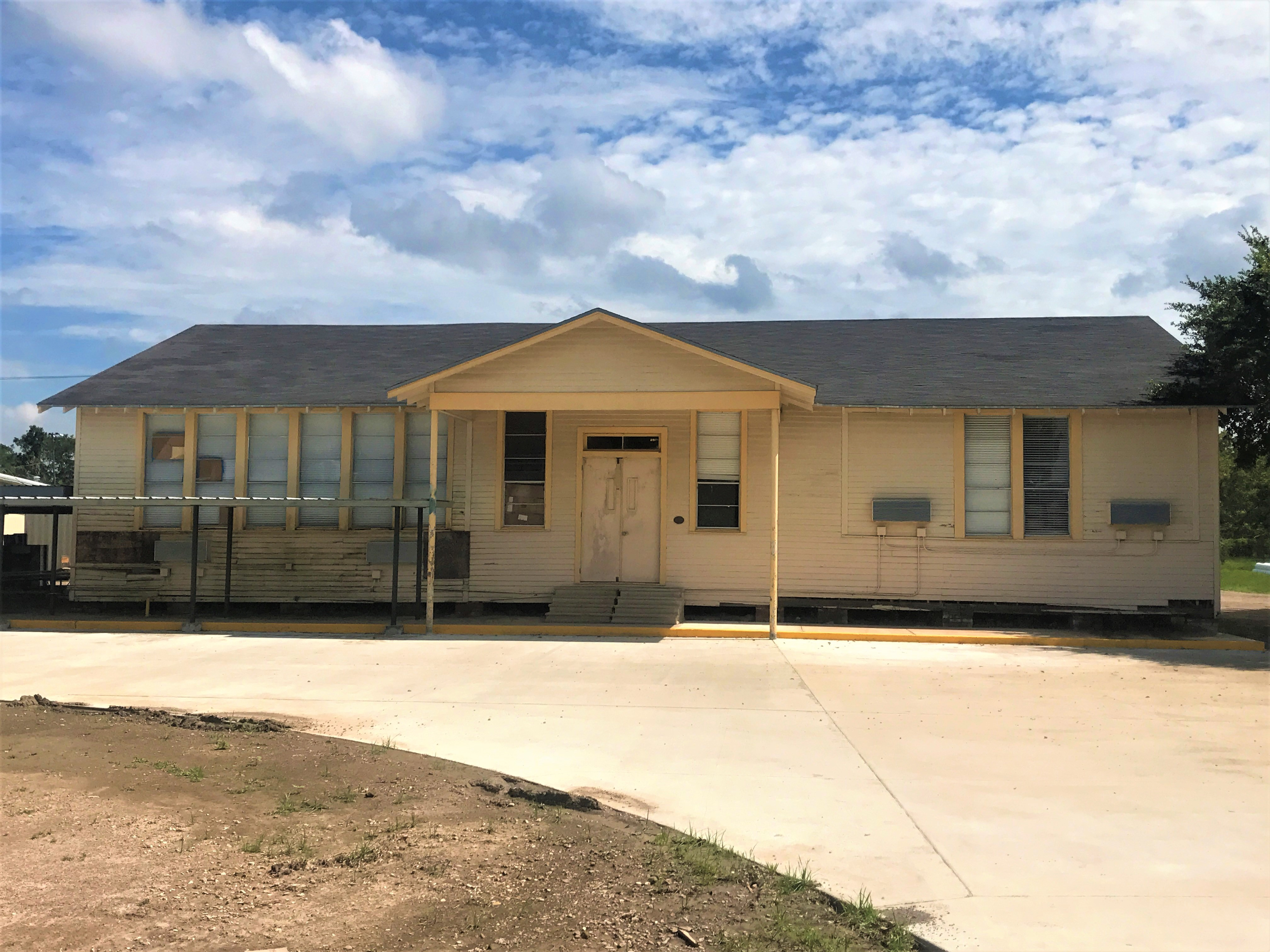
- Location: 3264 LA 167, Plaisance, Louisiana, United States
- Coordinates: 30.618611°N 92.1325°W
- Built: 1921
- NRHP reference No.: 04000080
- Added to NRHP: August 23, 2004

Plaisance School is a school, established in 1921, in Plaisance, Louisiana, United States. The school was segregated during the Jim Crow-era and served African American students. It also went by the names Plaisance High School, and Plaisance Rosenwald School.

The Plaisance School has been listed on the National Register of Historic Places since 2004, for the school's contribution to educational history and Black ethnic heritage. A historical marker commemorates the school history.

The Plaisance School is one of very few surviving Rosenwald Schools still actively being used as a school building, and now serves as Plaisance Elementary School.

== History ==
The Plaisance School was built in 1921 as Rosenwald School. The building housed 160 students in grades one through six, seven, or eight, during the period from 1920 to 1953. Up until the 1960s, the Plaisance School was the only school for African American students in the community. Only 393 Rosenwald Schools were built in Louisiana (between 1914 and 1932), and only three still exist in recognizable form (Longstreet Rosenwald School, Plaisance School, and Community Rosenwald School); only one, the Plaisance School, remains on its original site.

Merline Pitre, is an alumna and taught French at the school.

== Modern history ==
Plaisance High School was consolidated into Northwest High School in 1991, and the Rosenwald building (one of several buildings on the campus) now serves as Plaisance Elementary School. Opelousas students in grades five through eight take classes in the historical classrooms. In 2017, the school reopened after suffering damages in a flood and, in early 2022, plans to restore and repair the historic Rosenwald structure were set into motion. On November 12, 2022, those plans came to fruition and a dedication ceremony was held at the school building to commemorate the completion of the building’s renovation.

== See also ==
- List of Rosenwald Schools
- National Register of Historic Places listings in St. Landry Parish, Louisiana
