= Washington, Louisiana =

- Town
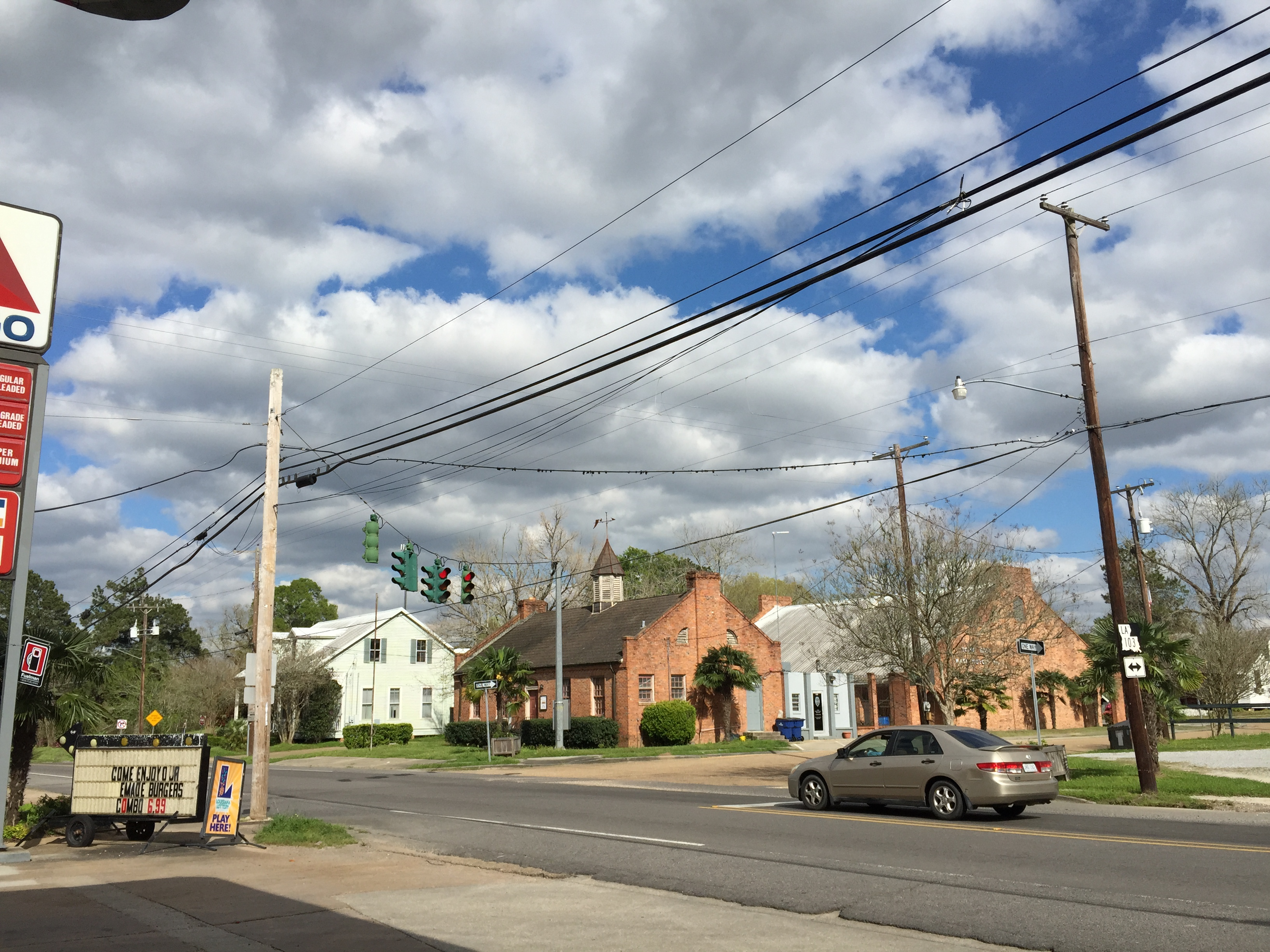
- The intersection of De Jean Street and Main Street in Washington

- Location of Washington in St. Landry Parish, Louisiana.

- Location of Louisiana in the United States
- Coordinates: 30°36′54″N 92°03′34″W
- Country: United States
- State: Louisiana
- Parish: St. Landry

Area
  - Total: 0.85 sq mi (2.20 km^{2})
  - Land: 0.83 sq mi (2.14 km^{2})
  - Water: 0.023 sq mi (0.06 km^{2})
- Elevation: 59 ft (18 m)

Population (2020)
  - Total: 742
  - Density: 896.7/sq mi (346.23/km^{2})
- Time zone: UTC-6 (CST)
  - Summer (DST): UTC-5 (CDT)
- Area code: 337
- FIPS code: 22-79870
- GNIS feature ID: 2406835
- Website: townofwashingtonla.net

Washington is a village in St. Landry Parish, Louisiana, United States. The population was 742 as of the 2020 census. It is part of the Opelousas–Eunice Micropolitan Statistical Area. Washington was the largest inland port between New Orleans and St. Louis for much of the 19th century.

== History ==
Washington was founded as the Post of Opelousas in 1764 as a French trading post. In 1766, the first church, La Iglesia paroquial de la Immaculada Conception del Puesto de Opelousas, was established and the post later became known as Church Landing in 1822. In 1835, the town was incorporated under the current name.

In the early 1800s smaller steamboats started traveling up Bayou Teche to the Opelousas River, renamed Bayou Courtableau, at Barre’s Landing (named after Alexander Charles Barré) that became Port Barre, then to Washington where there was a bottleneck as the steamboats could not turn around. In 1848 Captain George W. Haygood completed a steamboat turnaround and Washington became an inland port.

The Grimble Bell School was located in Washington and was the first African American school in the parish when it opened in the 1830s; it was forced closed by white vigilantes in 1860.

During the American Civil War, some of Union General Nathaniel P. Banks' forces occupied several towns in the region, including Washington, which was then larger than the parish seat of Opelousas. Banks' men stripped the towns of supplies of all kinds, including food, livestock, cotton, and other trade goods; the total value of the goods was estimated at more than ten million dollars.

After the war, there was extensive white resistance to the emancipation and enfranchisement of former slaves or freedmen. Some insurgents based in Opelousas formed the Seymour Knights, a unit of the Knights of the White Camellia. In the fall of 1868 before the election, white Democrats in Washington rejected African Americans who sought to join their political party, and the Seymour Knights physically drove the Blacks out of the city.

A series of events followed in which Blacks marched on Opelousas and 29 men were captured. All but two were executed without trial. White mobs then launched attacks against Blacks across the parish seat and surrounding areas, killing an estimated 50 to 200-300 African Americans, in what became known as the Opelousas Massacre.

== Geography ==
According to the United States Census Bureau, the town has a total area of 0.9 square miles (2.3 km^{2}), of which 0.9 square miles (2.3 km^{2}) is land and 1.15% is water.

== Demographics ==
Historical population
Census	Pop.	Note	%±
1860	536		—
1870	907		69.2%
1880	1,194		31.6%
1890	1,064		−10.9%
1900	1,197		12.5%
1910	1,528		27.7%
1920	1,041		−31.9%
1930	1,004		−3.6%
1940	1,264		25.9%
1950	1,291		2.1%
1960	1,291		0.0%
1970	1,473		14.1%
1980	1,266		−14.1%
1990	1,253		−1.0%
2000	1,082		−13.6%
2010	964		−10.9%
2020	742		−23.0%
2025 (est.)	704	▼	−5.1%
U.S. Decennial Census

=== 2020 census ===
Washington racial composition
Race	Number	Percentage
White (non-Hispanic)	302	40.7%
Black or African American (non-Hispanic)	410	55.26%
Native American	1	0.13%
Other/Mixed	17	2.29%
Hispanic or Latino	12	1.62%

As of the 2020 United States census, there were 742 people, 382 households, and 212 families residing in the town.

=== 2010 census ===
As of the 2010 United States census, there were 964 people living in the town. The racial makeup of the town was 52.8% Black, 43.2% White, 0.4% Native American, 0.1% Asian and 1.7% from two or more races. 1.9% were Hispanic or Latino of any race.

=== 2000 census ===
At the 2000 census, there were 1,082 people, 459 households and 289 families living in the town. The population density was 1,256.8 inhabitants per square mile (485.3/km^{2}). There were 535 housing units at an average density of 621.4 per square mile (239.9/km^{2}). The racial makeup of the town was 43.07% White, 56.28% African American, 0.37% from other races, and 0.28% from two or more races. Hispanic or Latino of any race were 1.02% of the population.

There were 459 households, of which 29.0% had children under the age of 18 living with them, 34.2% were married couples living together, 25.9% had a female householder with no husband present, and 37.0% were non-families. 34.4% of all households were made up of individuals, and 15.3% had someone living alone who was 65 years of age or older. The average household size was 2.36 and the average family size was 3.05.

Age distribution was 29.1% under the age of 18, 7.4% from 18 to 24, 24.7% from 25 to 44, 20.1% from 45 to 64, and 18.7% who were 65 years of age or older. The median age was 35 years. For every 100 females, there were 80.6 males. For every 100 females age 18 and over, there were 74.3 males.

The median household income was $12,177, and the median family income was $17,727. Males had a median income of $36,250 versus $14,479 for females. The per capita income for the town was $11,607. About 45.6% of families and 48.4% of the population were below the poverty line, including 58.0% of those under age 18 and 38.4% of those age 65 or over.

== Arts and culture ==
Washington holds the annual Festival du Courtableau, now renamed the Washington Catfish Festival. On November 15, 1978, the downtown area was added to the National Register of Historic Places as the Washington Historic District.

== Notable people ==
- Arthur T. Prescott, academic president and administrator
- Oramel H. Simpson, governor

== Speed trap ==
Washington has a reputation of being a speed trap; that is, a town where traffic laws are enforced extremely strictly as a means of generating revenue. A 2007 report from the Louisiana Legislative Auditor found that more than 50% of the town's revenue came from traffic-related fines in the 2005 fiscal year. It was one of 15 such towns. In 2009, then-mayor Joseph Pitre told The Advocate newspaper that he believed the town had collected between $700,000-$800,000 from speeding tickets yearly.

In 2014, State Representative Alan Seabaugh targeted Washington as the most "notorious" speed trap in the state. He obtained approval of the House Transportation Committee to allow enforcement of traffic laws only if a community had incorporated at least one-half mile of land that extends to each side of an interstate highway, excluding overpasses and ramps. At the time, Seabaugh reported receiving many complaints from constituents in Shreveport as well as out-of-state drivers who have been ticketed for speeding only slightly over the legal limit.
