= Washington Historic District (Washington, Louisiana) =

Historic district in Louisiana, United States

- U.S. National Register of Historic Places
- Location within Louisiana
- Location: LA 182, Washington, Louisiana
- Coordinates: 30°36′54″N 92°03′33″W
- Area: 210 acres (85 ha)
- Built: 1825
- Architectural style: Bungalow/craftsman, Queen Anne, Acadian cottage
- NRHP reference No.: 78003114
- Added to NRHP: November 15, 1978

The Washington Historic District in Washington, Louisiana is a 210 acres (85 ha) historic district which was listed on the National Register of Historic Places in 1978.

The listing included 200 contributing buildings and three contributing sites, comprising about 80 percent of the town of Washington, in 1978.
