= White's Chapel United Methodist Church =

Historic church in Louisiana, United States

- U.S. National Register of Historic Places
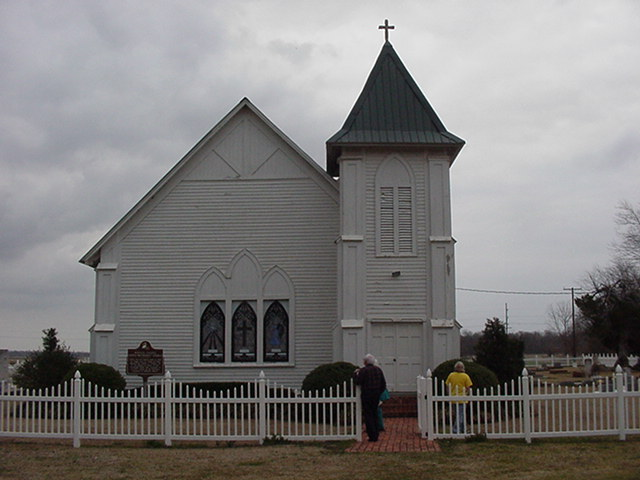

- Location within Louisiana Location within the United States
- Nearest city: Bunkie, Louisiana
- Coordinates: 30°50′01″N 92°12′12″W
- Area: 0.2 acres (0.081 ha)
- Built: 1894
- Architectural style: Late Gothic Revival
- NRHP reference No.: 83000540
- Added to NRHP: April 5, 1983

White's Chapel United Methodist Church is a historic church in rural St. Landry Parish, Louisiana. It was built in 1894 and added to the National Register in 1983.

It is a small wood frame Gothic Revival-style church located about 9 miles (14 km) south of the town of Bunkie, Louisiana.
