= Opelousas massacre =

Massacre in the United States

Coordinates: 30.527°N 92.086°W

- Part of the Reconstruction era
- Date: September 28, 1868
- Location: Opelousas, Louisiana
- Goals: Elimination of Black Republicans in St. Landry Parish
- Methods: Massacre, lynching, beating
- Result: Elimination of the Republican Party and all Republican votes in the 1868 presidential election from St. Landry Parish

Parties
White supremacist Democrats, including Knights of the White Camelia	Black citizens, white Republicans

Lead figures
John Williams, James R. Dickson, Sebastian May	Emerson Bentley

Casualties
- Deaths: Unknown, likely 200+

The Opelousas massacre, or St. Landry Massacre, which began on September 28, 1868, was one of the bloodiest massacres of the Reconstruction era in the United States. In the aftermath of the ratification of Louisiana's Constitution of 1868 and the Fourteenth Amendment to the United States Constitution, tensions between white Democrats and Black Republicans in St. Landry Parish, Louisiana escalated throughout the summer of 1868. On September 28, white schoolteacher and Republican newspaper editor Emerson Bentley was attacked and beaten by three, Democratic white supremacists while teaching a classroom of Black children in Opelousas, Louisiana. Rumors of Bentley's death, while unfounded, led both Black Republicans and white supremacist Democrats, including the St. Landry Parish chapter of the Knights of the White Camelia, to threaten violent retribution. In the days following Bentley's subsequent covert flight to New Orleans, the massacre began. Heavily outnumbered, Black citizens were chased, captured, shot, murdered, and lynched during the following weeks. While estimates of casualties vary widely, several sources number the deaths between 150 and 300 black people and several dozen whites. Following the massacre, the Republican Party in St. Landry Parish was eliminated for several years.

== Background ==
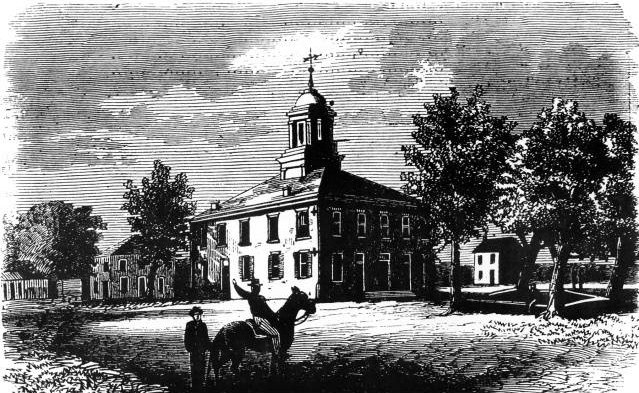
St. Landry Parish courthouse

The Louisiana Constitution of 1868, ratified in April, established a bill of rights, gave Black men the right to vote, established an integrated public education system throughout the state, and gave Blacks guaranteed access to public accommodations. As a result, both state and local Republican candidates were successful in the spring elections. In July, the Fourteenth Amendment to the United States Constitution was ratified, leading to increased tensions between white supremacists and newly enfranchised Black citizens. Throughout the summer of 1868, white supremacists harassed and shot Blacks throughout the state.

In St. Landry Parish, the white supremacist group Knights of the White Camelia was thought to have 3,000 members—21% of the population at the time. The Knights' local chapter, the Seymour Knights, established a sizeable presence at a September 13 meeting between Black Republicans and white Democrats in Washington, Louisiana. Several Blacks from nearby Opelousas were aiming to join the Democratic Party, and while neither party was enthusiastic about the move, the Seymour Knights intended to prevent it altogether. At one point, a misfired rifle almost caused tensions to erupt into chaos, but it ended peacefully with two provisions: Future attendees at gatherings would not be permitted to carry firearms, and newspaper editor Emerson Bentley of the Republican St. Landry Progress would refrain from publishing inflammatory anti-Democrat rhetoric in the paper.

=== Emerson Bentley ===
18-year-old Bentley, a white man, had come to Louisiana from his native Ohio as a Freedmen's Bureau teacher, and in addition to editing the Progress and serving as secretary of the local Republican Party, he taught Black students at a Bureau school in Opelousas. In early September, 1868, Bentley arrived to the classroom and found a note on the door. It read "E.B. Beware! K.K.K." and included drawings of a coffin, a skull and bones, and a bloody dagger.

Bentley did not, however, comply with the request of the September 13 meeting: His subsequent Progress editorial criticized Democrats, praised the "morals" of the Republican party, and encouraged Black citizens to rejoin the party, which he deemed less violent.

== Events ==
On September 28, 1868, Bentley was instructing a class at the Freedmen's School when he was interrupted and confronted by three Seymour Knights: John Williams, James R. Dickson, and Sebastian May. In front of Bentley's students, the three men beat and whipped Bentley and forced him to sign a retraction of the editorial. When the beating began, the children ran from the classroom, shouting "They are killing Mr. Bentley!", giving birth to the rumors that the teacher had been killed.

Bentley escaped but fled in secret, hiding out in Republican safe houses for several weeks before reaching New Orleans. Meanwhile, Black Republicans began organizing and threatening vengeance for the missing Bentley's "death." White supremacists, including the Knights, responded by mobilizing thousands of members.

As the massacre began, the white supremacists held a clear advantage in both numbers and weapons, and they began hunting, capturing and killing Black Republicans and white party leaders. Twenty-seven of the first Blacks captured were lynched the next day, and families were chased and shot both in public and in their homes. The white mobs destroyed the Freedmen's school and the office of the St. Landry Progress and lynched C. E. Durand, Bentley's co-editor, leaving his body displayed outside the drug store in Opelousas. Blacks who escaped were driven into the swamps and shot.

== Aftermath ==
Estimates of the casualties vary widely. Democratic Party media reported 100 or less, while Republicans estimated between 200 and 300. Other estimates claim between 150 and 300 Black casualties and 30 to 50 whites. The massacre is considered one of the bloodiest of the Reconstruction era.

Following the massacre, the Republican Party in St. Landry Parish was effectively eliminated. No Republican votes were recorded the 1868 presidential election, and election officials surmised that anyone who voted off the Democratic ticket would have been killed "inside of 24 hours." The Republican Party did not have a presence in the parish for four years, and had no Republican newspaper until 1876.

In 2021, the St. Landry Parish NAACP held a vigil commemorating the anniversary of the beginning of the massacre.
