= Martin Donato House =

- U.S. National Register of Historic Places
- Location within Louisiana
- Location: 8343 Louisiana Highway 182, Opelousas, Louisiana
- Area: 75.6 acres (30.6 ha)
- Built: c.1825
- Architectural style: French Creole
- MPS: Louisiana's French Creole Architecture MPS
- NRHP reference No.: 05000345
- Added to NRHP: April 27, 2005

The Martin Donato House, in St. Landry Parish, Louisiana, was built around 1825. It was listed on the National Register of Historic Places in 2005.

It was deemed significant as "an important and rare surviving French Creole house within St. Landry Parish. It is locally significant under Criterion A in the area of ethnic heritage because it embodies the economic attainment of an important ethnic group in antebellum St. Landry - the gens de couleur libres, or free people of color. Specifically it was home to the Donato family, the most prosperous free people of color family in the parish." Martin Donatto was a Free Black slave owner who owned 70 slaves in 1830.

It is located at 8343 Louisiana Highway 182 near Opelousas, Louisiana, about a quarter mile off the highway.

It is a single-story French Creole plantation house with Federal details. It has also been known as the August Donato House.

It was in deteriorated condition in 2004.
