= Plaisance, Louisiana =

Plaisance
- Unincorporated community
- Location within the state of Louisiana
- Coordinates: 30°36′45″N 92°07′34″W
- Country: United States
- State: Louisiana
- Parish: St. Landry
- Elevation: 66 ft (20 m)
- Time zone: UTC-6 (Central (CST))
  - Summer (DST): UTC-5 (CDT)
- GNIS feature ID: 1627942

Plaisance is an unincorporated community in St. Landry Parish, Louisiana, United States. It is the location of the former Plaisance High School, which is listed on the National Register of Historic Places.

It is home to the Original Southwest Louisiana Zydeco Music Festival and to Mr. Clifton Chenier, the originator of Zydeco music.

== Notable people ==
- James A. Joseph (born 1935), former United States Ambassador to South Africa
- O'Neil Ray Collins (1931–1989), botanist and mycologist
