= Kau Ka Pe'a =

Studio album by Kalani Peʻa
- Released: April 30, 2021
- Recorded: 2021
- Studio: Seventh Wave Production
- Genre: Hawaiian, folk, world
- Label: Pe'a Records & Entertainment

Kalani Peʻa chronology
No 'Ane'i (2018)	Kau Ka Pe'a (2021)	Kuini (album) (2024)

Kau Ka Peʻa is an album by Kalani Peʻa. "Kau" means to be placed or to hoist. "Pe'a" is Kalani's last name, which means the sailboat or the sail of the boat. The theme of the album is to hoist your sail, create your own sailboat and voyage; navigate the world. It was recorded during the 2020-2021 COVID-19 pandemic. The album pays tribute to people and places. The album honors royal Hawaiian ali'i including Kalākaua, Kamehameha I and Queen Kalama. It includes seven original Hawaiian language songs written or co-written by Pe'a, plus covers of "When I Fall in Love" by Heyman/Young and "Bring Him Home (Les Misérables)" from Les Misérables. Among other original compositions, "‘O Mauna Leo I Ka La’i" celebrates his Wailuku home and love for his partner Allan B. Cool, while "Pa’ani I Ka Baso" honors his father and his talent as a bass guitar player. On "Kuhio Makamae", he pays tribute to Prince Jonah Kuhio Kalaniana’ole and his resistance to the overthrow of the Hawaiian Kingdom and illegal annexation of Hawaii. Pe'a debuted songs from "Kau Ka Pe'a" on an interview with Oregon Artswatch in 2021. Pe'a held his cd release concert at Blue Note Hawaii in August 2021.

== Production ==
Kau Ka Pe'a was released on April 30, 2021. It was produced, mixed and mastered by Dave Tucciarone in Honolulu, Hawaii, and co-produced by Kalani Pe'a and his partner Allan B. Cool. Some of the musicians performing on the album include Amy Hānaialiʻi Gilliom, Kimie Miner, Imua Garza, Dave Tucciarone, Kenneth Makuakane, Ikaika Blackburn, Wailau Ryder, Nalei Pokipala, Aaron Nelson and Reggie Padilla. Pe'a also worked with Hawaiian music writers on the album including Larry Kimura and Kumu Kawaikapuokalani Frank Hewett.

== Awards ==
Kau Ka Pe'a' won the Grammy Award for Best Regional Roots Music Album at the 64th Annual Grammy Awards.

== Track listing ==
1. Kulāiwi - 3:23
2. Kau Ka Pe‘a (feat. Pandanus Club, Kimie and Kalenakū ) - 3:23
3. ‘A‘ahu Poli‘ahu - 3:58
4. ‘O Mauna Leo I Ka La‘i - 3:02
5. Pā‘ani I Ka Baso - 3:09
6. He Kāheahea I Nā Kini A‘o Lilinoe - 3:30
7. When I Fall in Love (E Mau Ke Aloha Ē) (feat. Amy Hānaialiʻi Gilliom) - 3:57
8. Ha‘a Hula - 2:46
9. Kaniakapūpū - 4:17
10. Kūhiō Makamae - 2:12
11. Bring Him Home - 3:11
