= No ʻAneʻi =

Studio album by Kalani Peʻa
- Released: August 10, 2018
- Recorded: 2018
- Studio: Seventh Wave Production
- Genres: Hawaiian, folk, world
- Label: Kalani Peʻa Music LLC

Kalani Peʻa chronology
E Walea (2016)	No ʻAneʻi (2018)	Kau Ka Pe'a (2021)

No ʻAneʻi is the second album by Hawaiian singer Kalani Peʻa. No ʻAneʻi translates to "We Belong Here". The theme of the album is to remind people of the value of becoming primary resources of the land on which they live and that people maintain and retain the resources so that everyone in Hawaiʻi will benefit.

== Production ==
No 'Ane'i was released on August 10, 2018. It was produced, mixed and mastered by Dave Tucciarone in Honolulu, Hawaii, and co-produced by Kalani Pe'a and his partner Allan B. Cool. Some of the featured musicians and vocalists on the album are Amy Hānaialiʻi Gilliom, Hoʻokena, Moon Kauakahi, Willie K, Aaron Salā, Aiau Koa, Casey Olsen, Imua Garza and Wailau Ryder. The album features eight original songs Pe'a wrote or co-wrote.

== Awards ==
No 'Ane'i was nominated for a Grammy Award in December 2018, and won the award in February 2019, for Best Regional Roots Music Album. No 'Ane'i peaked at number 11 on the Billboard charts under World Music Albums.

== Track listing ==
1. "Hilo March" – 2:44
2. "No 'Ane'i" – 3:20
3. "Kahunani No ʻŌlaʻa" – 3:20
4. "Hāmoa" – 4:26
5. "Oli Aloha No Wailuku" – 1:40
6. "Ke 'A'a O Nā Lani" – 3:19
7. "ʻElala He Inoa" – 3:38
8. "Superstar" – 3:46
9. "Wehiwehi A'o Hilo" – 3:09
10. "ʻAkaka Falls" – 3:11
11. "Pa'a Mau" – 3:16
12. "Nā Hua O Ke Aloha" – 5:09
