= Ivan Klisanin =

Ivan Klisanin is an American record producer. He is from Lafayette, Louisiana, United States.

== Awards ==
- 2010 Grammy Winner for Best Zydeco or Cajun Music Album for Chubby Carrier and the Bayou Swamp Band - Zydeco Junkie.
- 2010 Grammy nomination for Best Zydeco or Cajun Album for Feufollet - En Couleurs.
- 2013 Grammy nomination for Best Regional Roots Music Album for Corey Ledet With Anthony Dopsie, Dwayne Dopsie and Andre Thierry - Nothin' But the Best.
- 2016 Grammy nomination for Best Regional Roots Music Album for The Revelers - Get Ready.

== Discography ==
- The Bluerunners - Honey Slides
- Feufollet - Cow Island Hop, En Couleurs
- Horace Trahan - Keep Walking, All the Way, Until the End.
- The Mercy Brothers - Holy Ghost Power
- Odd Arnie - Stating the Oddvious
