= Klisanin =

Klisanin or Klišanin is a Croatian toponymic surname for an inhabitant of Klis (municipality in Dalmatia). According to oral tradition, 2 brothers from Klis with the surname Džaja moved to the town of Aržano wherein they were given the nickname "Klišanin" (inhabitant of Klis) which they would begin using as a surname. Later one of the brothers moved to the Croatian village Miši near the town of Livno in modern-day Bosnia and Herzegovina. Where his descendants still carry the surname Klišanin. Notable people with the surname include:

- Dana Klisanin, American psychologist, futurist, and game designer
- Ivan Klisanin, American record producer
- Miroslav Klišanin, Croatian handball player
