= Ranky Tanky =

American musical group

- Origin: Charleston, South Carolina, U.S.
- Genres: Gullah, jazz, world music
- Years active: 2016–present
- Label: Resilience Music Alliance
- Members: Quentin E. Baxter (drums); Kevin Hamilton (bass); Quiana Parler (vocals); Clay Ross (guitar, vocals); Charlton Singleton (trumpet, vocals)
- Website: www.rankytanky.com

Ranky Tanky is an American musical ensemble based in Charleston, South Carolina. It specializes in jazz-influenced arrangements of traditional Gullah music, a culture that originated among descendants of enslaved Africans in the Lowcountry region of the US Southeast. Apart from lead vocalist Quiana Parler, four of the group's members, Quentin Baxter, Kevin Hamilton, Clay Ross, and Charlton Singleton, previously played together in the Charleston jazz quartet The Gradual Lean in the late 1990s.

Their debut album, Ranky Tanky, was released in October 2017. By the week of February 10, 2018, it was listed number one in the Billboard jazz charts, a position it held for two weeks.

For their album Good Time, the band won the 2020 Grammy Award for Best Regional Roots Music Album. In 2023, they won a second Grammy in the Best Regional Roots Music Album category, for Live at the 2022 New Orleans Jazz & Heritage Festival.

== History ==
Baxter, Hamilton, and Ross met while studying music at the College of Charleston in the 1990s. Singleton met up with them after he had returned to the Lowcountry after studying music at South Carolina State University. Shortly thereafter they formed a jazz quartet called Gradual Lean. After splitting up to pursue individual careers for the following two decades, an idea came from Ross to reform the group, this time as an exploration of Gullah music, a cultural tradition from which Baxter, Hamilton, and Singleton have roots. For this project, vocalist and fellow Charlestonian Quiana Parler was brought on board. While Ross and Parler are not themselves from a Gullah community, all the band members grew up in South Carolina.

Prior to forming Ranky Tanky, Ross was active in the band Matuto, a world music group which combined Brazilian Forró music with modern jazz elements. The other band members' careers have been similarly varied: Parler was a contestant on season two of American Idol, while Singleton, who also attended Berklee College of Music, was the musical and artistic director of the Charleston Jazz Orchestra. Baxter has toured with jazz artist René Marie, and from 1997 to 2019 was an adjunct Professor of Jazz Studies at the College of Charleston. In 2012, Hamilton was a collaborating artist in the US State Department's OneBeat musical exchange program.

The name "Ranky Tanky" comes from a Gullah expression roughly translated as 'get funky.' The overall goal of the group was to create a contemporary interpretation of the Gullah musical vocabulary to share with the world, while remaining true to the pared-down, working-class attitude of the songs.

=== Ranky Tanky (2017) ===
Ranky Tanky's debut studio album featured 13 tracks, all of which are arrangements of Gullah folk songs. Writing for NPR, Banning Eyre declared that "on the self-titled debut by the quintet Ranky Tanky, Gullah songs are lively, soulful honey to the ears...in a pop music milieu ever hungry for newness, this group proves that the right musicians can make the past new all over again."

== Musical style and reception ==
The Gullah lyrics and melodies that Ranky Tanky uses range from traditional spirituals, to children's rhymes and dance music. Due to its relative geographic isolation, the Sea Islands region preserved more of the West African rhythms, dialects, and musical traditions than the mainland US, which once combined with British colonial influence emerged as the distinct Gullah culture. Ranky Tanky's use of instruments like the electric guitar and trumpet are novel additions to Gullah music, which was historically performed using only a cappella voices and body percussion. Ross credits the 20th century African American folk singer Bessie Jones as laying much of the groundwork for the band, due to her extensive recording and documentation of the songs and rhymes later used in Ranky Tanky.

Akornefa Akyea's review of their song "That's Alright" on Afropop Worldwide stated that: "you hear the common theme in most spirituals of looking to life after death as a welcome reprieve from the inhumane conditions experienced by enslaved black people in America...it's this incredible duality of profound sadness positioned in front of a forward-moving rhythm section that quite frankly makes you want to dance and sing along with hope."

A review by Bobby Reed of Ranky Tanky in DownBeat magazine declared: "lead singer Quiana Parler is a powerhouse presence, and trumpeter Charlton Singleton is amazingly adept at crafting lines that complement the singer's timbre. A good example is "O Death", on which the trumpeter's lament is akin to a vocal delivery. On "Turtle Dove", electric guitarist Clay Ross plays in a style that seems to draw a connection to West African music of the 20th century."

== Personnel ==
- Quentin E. Baxter (drums) (2016-present)
- Kevin Hamilton (bass) (2016-present)
- Quiana Parler (lead vocals) (2016-present)
- Clay Ross (guitar, vocals) (2016-present)
- Charlton Singleton (trumpet, vocals) (2016-present)

== Discography ==
=== Studio and live albums ===
- Ranky Tanky (2017)
- Good Time (2019)
- Recorded Live at the 2022 New Orleans Jazz & Heritage Festival (2022)
- This Village (2026)

=== Various artist compilation albums ===
- "Freedom" on The Oxford American Southern Music Issue, Featuring South Carolina (volume 21, 2019)

== Chart positions ==
Title	Formats	Details	Peak chart positions
Title	Formats	Details	Jazz
Ranky Tanky	Compact Disc, Digital Download	Release date: October 19, 2017; Label: Resilience Music Alliance	1

== Awards ==
Grammy Awards

Year	Nominee / work	Award	Result
2020	Good Time	Best Regional Roots Music Album	Won
2023	Recorded Live at the 2022 New Orleans Jazz & Heritage Festival	Best Regional Roots Music Album	Won
2027	This Village	Best Regional Roots Music Album	Pending
