= Okimoto =

Okimoto is a Japanese surname. Notable people with the surname include:

- Dana Okimoto (1966–), American Branch Davidian
- Jerry T. Okimoto (1924–1998), a Japanese-American artist
- Kevin Okimoto, a Hawaiian singer and musician
- Masaki Okimoto (沖本 摩幸, born 1982), a Japanese professional wrestler
- Poliana Okimoto (1983–), Brazilian swimmer
- Val Okimoto, American politician (surname acquired by marriage)

Okimoto is also a masculine Japanese given name. Notable people with the name include:

- Mōri Okimoto (毛利 興元, 1492–1516), head to the Mōri clan
