= Kalani Peʻa =

Hawaiian singer-songwriter

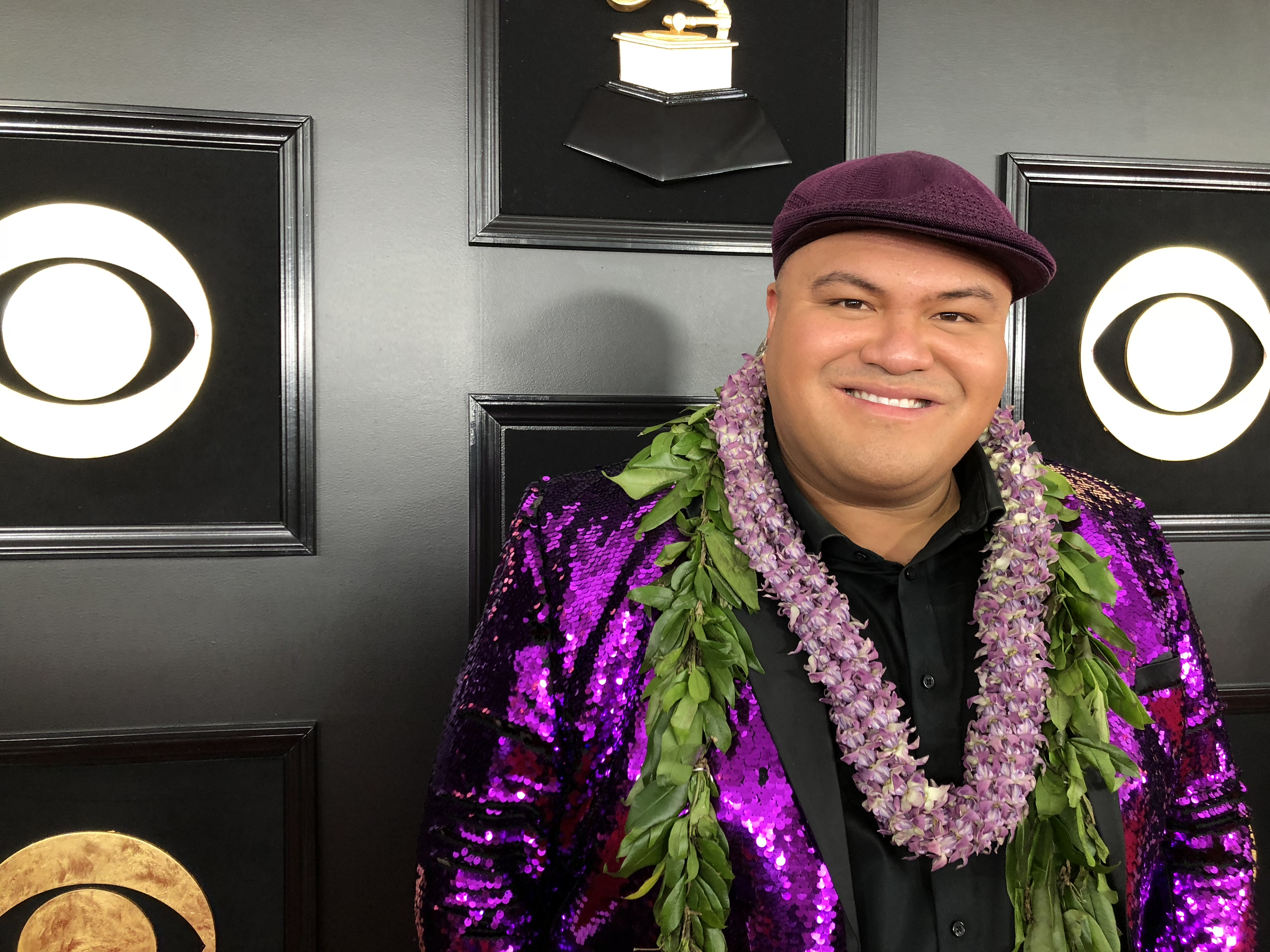
- Kalani Peʻa at the 2019 Grammy Awards Red Carpet

Background information
- Born: Trazaara Kalani Juanito Peʻa; April 13, 1983 (age 43); Panaʻewa, Hilo, Hawaii, US
- Genres: Hawaiian; world
- Occupations: Singer, songwriter, entertainer, educator
- Years active: 2016–present
- Website: kalanipeamusic.com

Kalani Peʻa (born April 13, 1983) is a four-time Grammy Award winning singer-songwriter of Hawaiian music. He released his first album, E Walea, in 2016, which won the 2017 Grammy Award for Best Regional Roots Music Album. Peʻa released his second album, No 'Ane'i, in 2018, which won the 2019 Grammy for Best Regional Roots Music Album. His fifth album, Kuini, was released in 2024 and was awarded the Grammy for Best Regional Roots Music Album at the 67th Annual Grammy Awards in 2025, giving Peʻa a record number of wins in the category.

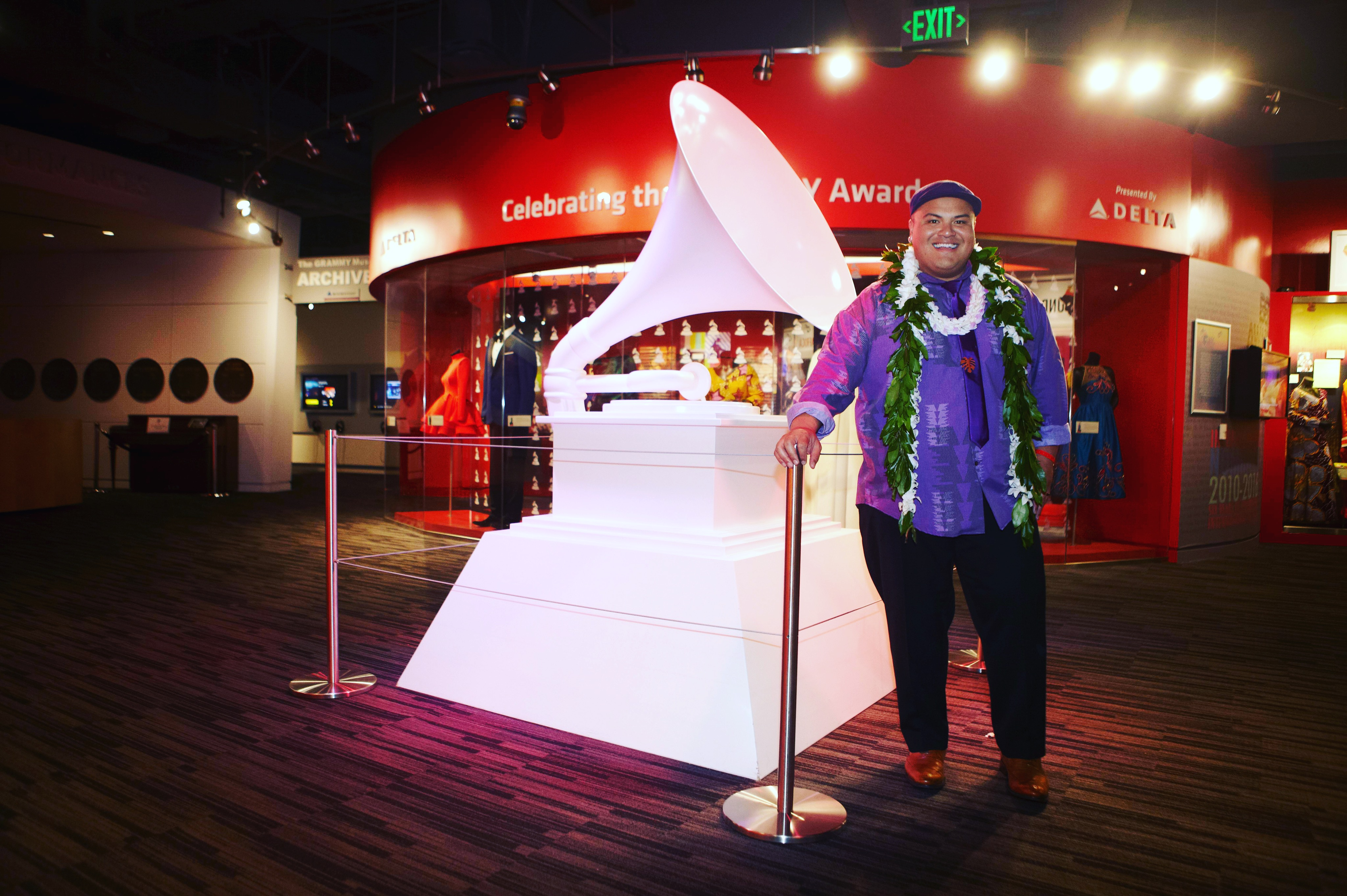
Kalani Peʻa Grammy Museum Los Angeles 2017

Peʻa, who is Kānaka Maoli, is also an educator, and promotes Hawaiian language and culture. He is a supporter of Hawaiian-language immersion schools.

== Early life and education ==
Peʻa was born in Hilo, Hawai'i and raised in Pana‘ewa, Hilo, Hawai'i. He comes from a musical family and his mother, Pua Leonard, introduced him to music to help him with words. Peʻa started singing as a young boy due to a speech impediment, later saying that music saved his life. His father, Arthur Pe‘a, also exposed him to jazz and big band music, which later influenced Kalani's musical style. In his early years, Peʻa performed in choirs and talent competitions. His influences include The Temptations and Stevie Wonder.

Peʻa received his bachelor's degree at Colorado Mesa University in Mass Communications with an emphasis in public relations/news editorial and has also worked on his master's degree focusing on early childhood education. He is a 2001 graduate of Ke Kula o Nawahiokalaniopuu, the Hawaiian Language School in Keaʻau, Puna, HI. Peʻa illustrated and published five Hawaiian language children stories. Peʻa is a fluent Hawaiian language speaker. He left his position as a Hawaiian resource coordinator at Kamehameha Schools in 2017 to pursue his musical career.

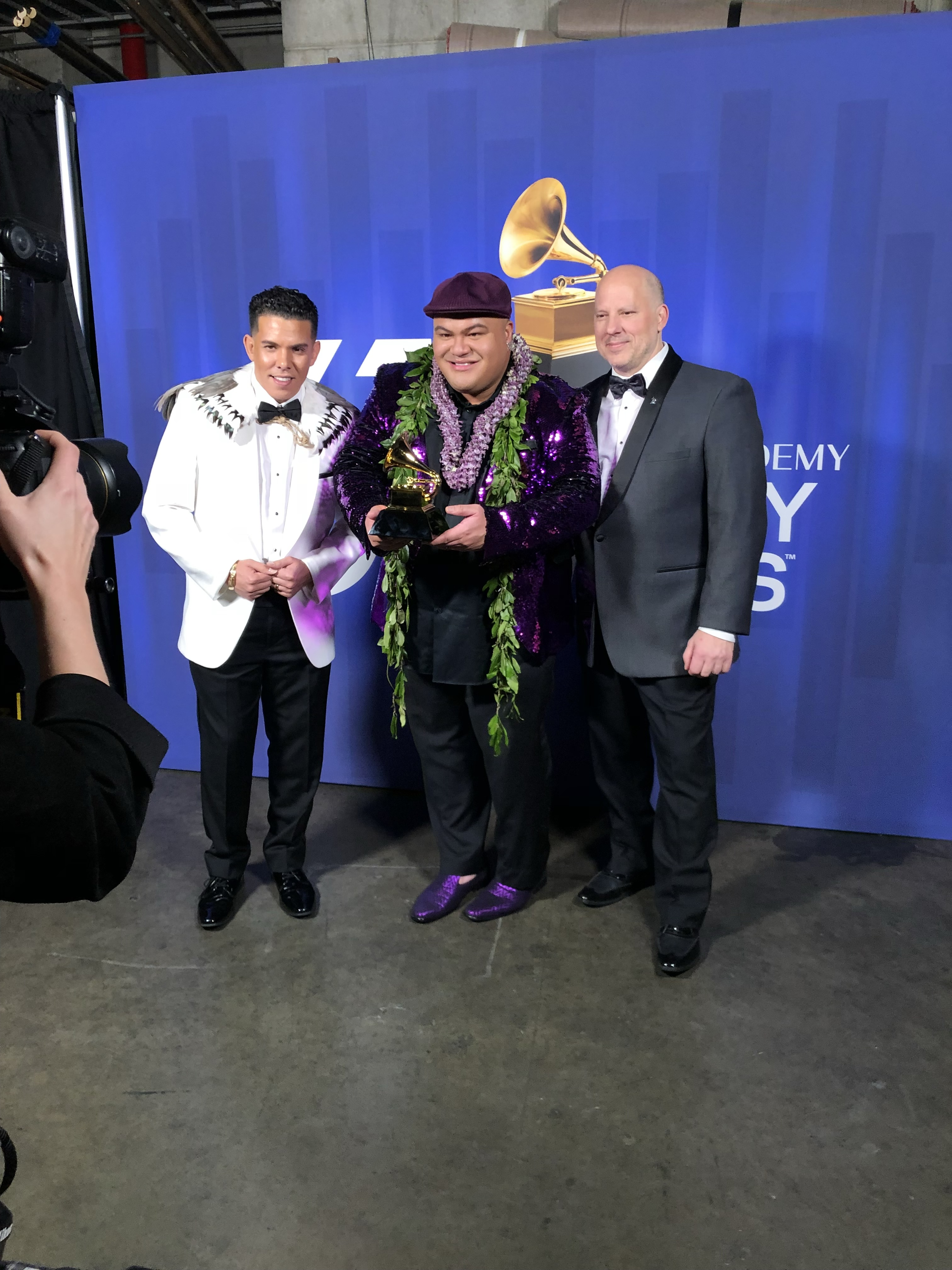
Kalani Pe'a & Allan B. Cool Grammys 2019 Backstage Microsoft Theatre

Peʻa was involved in musicals and acting productions while being part of various popular Play Bills at Colorado Mesa University. Peʻa was affiliated with the Chamber and Concert choirs during his first three years in college. In 2001, Kalani entered and won in the National Association of Teachers of Singing Competition for the Colorado/Wyoming Chapter.

== Music career ==
In 2017, his debut album E Walea won a Nā Hōkū Hanohano Award for Contemporary Album of the Year, and the Grammy Award for Best Regional Roots Music Album, becoming the first artist ever to win both awards for the same album, and the first non-Louisiana winner of Best Regional Roots Music Album since the category's inception in 2012.

In 2017, he performed at the Grammy Museum at L.A. Live alongside Henry Kapono, Kalapana and more. The show's theme was "We Are Friends: A Lifetime Party Of '70s Music".

When Peʻa won his Grammy Award in 2017 for Best Regional Roots Music Album his Producer Dave Tucciarone said "I don't think there could have been a better ambassador of aloha", "He is Hawaiian, he speaks fluent Hawaiian, he teaches Hawaiian and he's immersed in the culture. His first love may be soul and R&B, but he is a Hawaiian music artist … and the people on the Mainland saw his spirit shining through."

Both of Peʻa's albums E Walea and No 'Ane'i hit number 11 on the billboard charts.

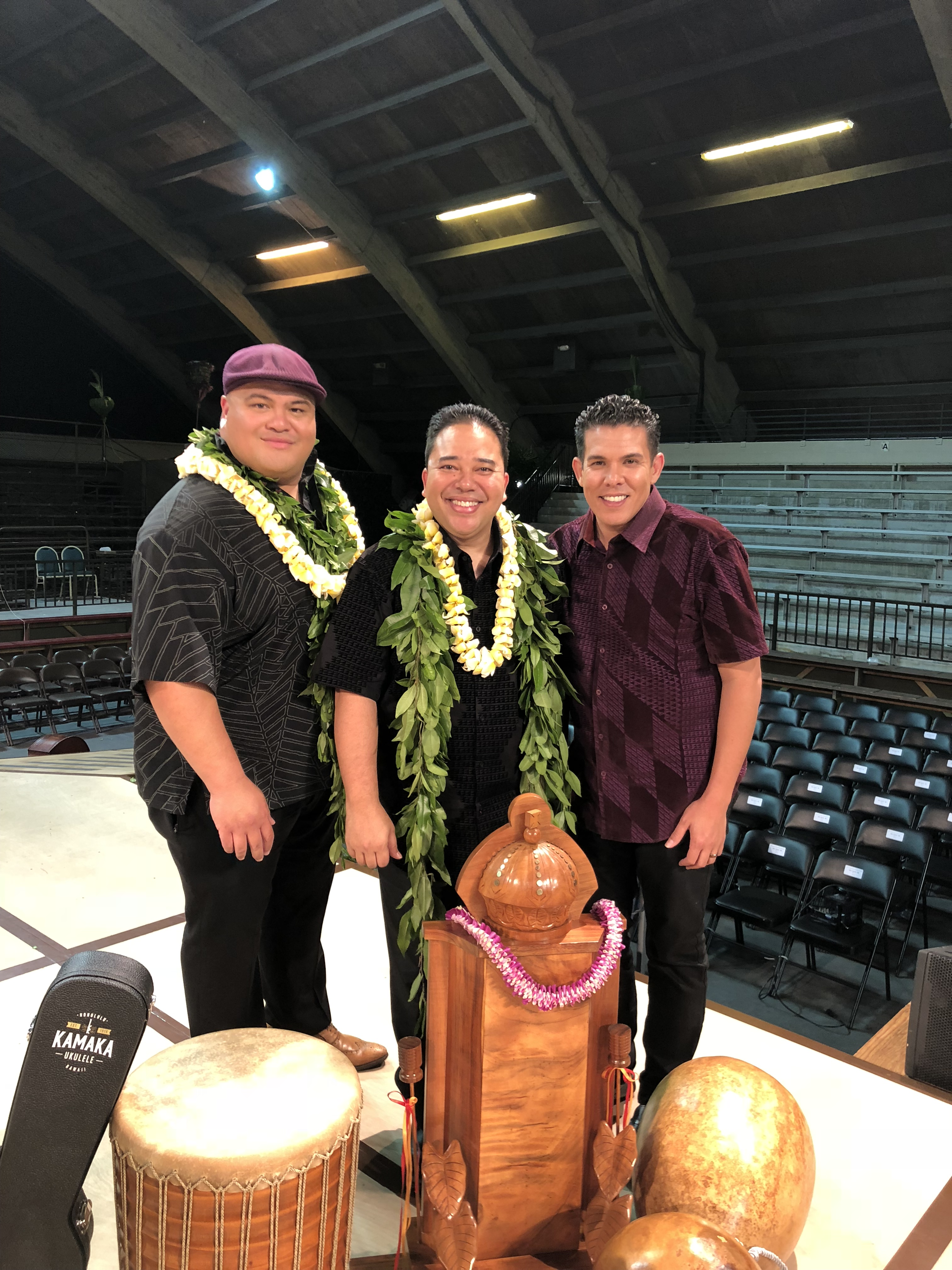
Kalani Peʻa & Kauʻi Kamanaʻo - Hula Hālau O Kamuela - 2019 Overall Winners of the Merrie Monarch Festival - Hilo HI - Lokalia Montgomery Perpetual Trophy

On December 22, 2018, Peʻa performed at the Hawaii Bowl Halftime Show at the Aloha Stadium. The attendance count was 30,911. The Hawaiʻi Bowl (currently known as the SoFi Hawaiʻi Bowl for sponsorship reasons) is a college football bowl game that has been played annually at Aloha Stadium in Honolulu, Hawaiʻi, since 2002. The bowl is one of eleven post-season contests run by ESPN Events.

Peʻa made his debut headline performance at the historic Hawaii Theatre in 2019.

In 2019, Peʻa was invited by The Recording Academy to present at the 61st Annual Grammy Awards Premiere Ceremony along with Lzzy Hale, Questlove, Cécile McLorin Salvant, Tokimonsta and Jimmy Jam and Terry Lewis. Shaggy (musician) was the official host for the official ceremony and Peʻa presented awards in ten categories.

Peʻa showed up on the red carpet at the 61st Annual Grammy Awards in a purple sequin blazer that caught attention from the press. His look was then featured and installed into the Grammy Museum at L.A. Live in March 2019. He paired his look with fresh lei from Hawaiʻi which was then recreated for the Grammy Museum at L.A. Live. His purple crown flower lei he wore was a gift from Hawaiian Music group Hoʻokena. Peʻa's partner and manager Allan B. Cool wore a feather cape, or ʻahu‘ula, created by master feather-worker and cultural practitioner Kawika Lum-Nelmida.

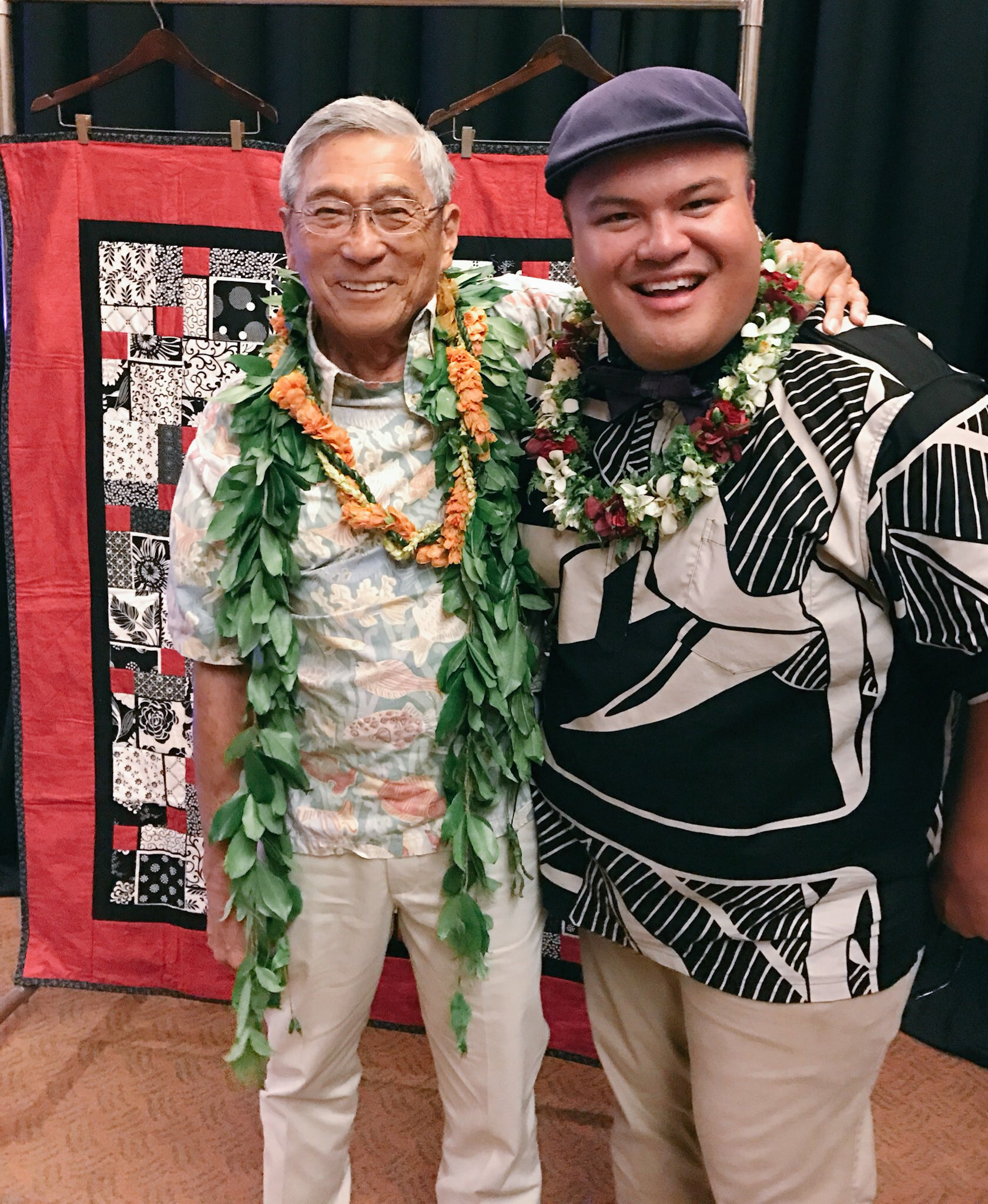
Hawaii County Mayor Harry Kim and Kalani Peʻa 2017

Peʻa made his debut at the Merrie Monarch Festival in 2019. He performed for Hula Hālau O Kamuela under the direction of Kumu Hula Kunewa Mook and Kauʻi Kamanaʻo. The hālau entered two of Peʻa's original compositions he wrote or co-wrote. In the Miss Aloha Hula Competition the mele or song entered was titled "Kuʻu Poliʻahu" and for the ʻauana or modern hula competition segment the mele or song entered was titled "He Lei Aloha (No Hilo)". The hālau took top overall honors including the Lōkālia Montgomery Perpetual Trophy.

In October 2019, Lincoln Center announced their American Songbook season line up for 2020. Pe'a was named to perform a part of the music series which also included Ali Stroker and Tony Award winner André De Shields. This marked Pe'a's debut performance in New York City and making it a first ever for Hawaiian music to be a part of the series.

In November 2019 a compilation album titled "Hawaiian Lullaby" by Haku Collective, a production agency based in Honolulu was nominated in the 62nd Annual Grammy Awards under the Best Regional Roots Music Album category. He contributed a song, titled “Ōpae Ē” which is a well known traditional Hawaiian song also covered by Israel Kamakawiwoʻole. The producers on album were Kimie Miner and Imua Garza.

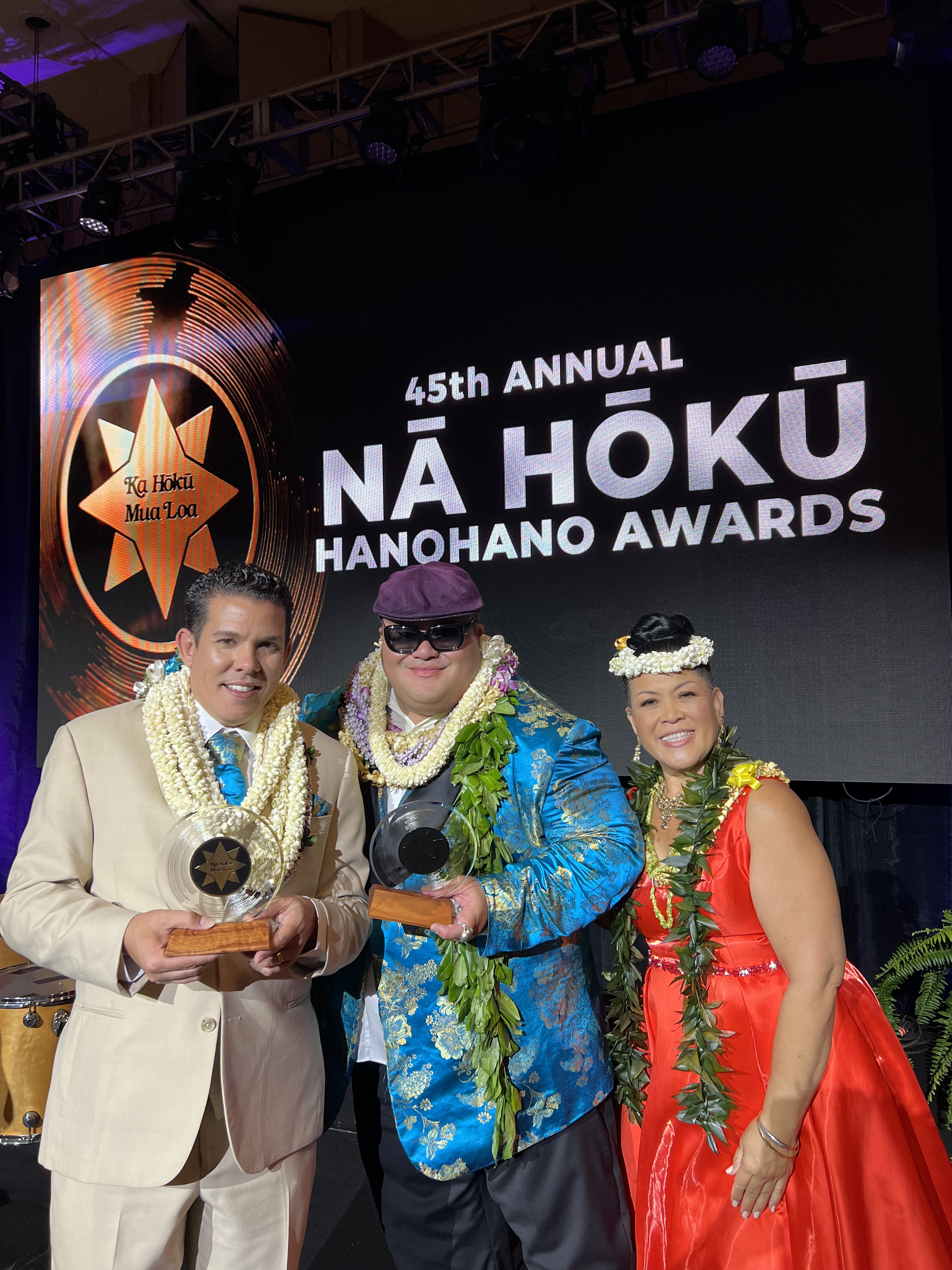
Allan Cool-Peʻa, Kalani Peʻa & Pua Peʻa

In April 2021 Pe'a released his third album titled Kau Ka Pe'a. It was recorded during the COVID-19 pandemic. The album pays tribute to people and places. The album honors royal Hawaiian ali'i including Kalākaua, Kamehameha I and Queen Kalama. It includes seven original Hawaiian language songs written or co-written by Pe'a, plus covers of "When I Fall in Love" by Heyman/Young and "Bring Him Home (Les Misérables)" from Les Misérables. In April 2022 Pe'a won his third Grammy Award for Kau Ka Pe'a in the Best Regional Roots Music Album category. At the 64th Annual Grammy Awards Premiere Ceremony Pe'a performed as part of the opening act at the MGM Grand in Las Vegas. The song "Dance to the Music" by Sly and the Family Stone was performed by Kalani Pe’a, Nnenna Freelon, Madison Cunningham, Falu, The Isaacs And John Popper.

Peʻa made his Carnegie Hall debut in 2024. He was selected as the first Native Hawaiian to present Hawaiian Music as part of their "Musical Explorers" program. Peʻa performed eight private concerts and two public shows which were sold out for a total of ten concerts in New York City. The show was led by Grammy Award winner, Kalani Pe'a; violinist and singer Layth Sidiq, traditions of Iraqi folk music; and Dominican Roots music, led by guitarist, vocalist, and composer Yasser Tejeda. The ten concerts were held inside of Zankel Hall.

Kalani Peʻa was inducted into the "Maui Nui Hall of Fame" in June 2024. The inductees included 40 individuals in Music, Film and Sports. The list of name highlighted those who have left a lasting impact in their respective fields. Some of the names included in the "Maui Nui Hall of Fame" were Kealiʻi Reichel, Amy Hānaialiʻi Gilliom and Willie K.

== Honors ==
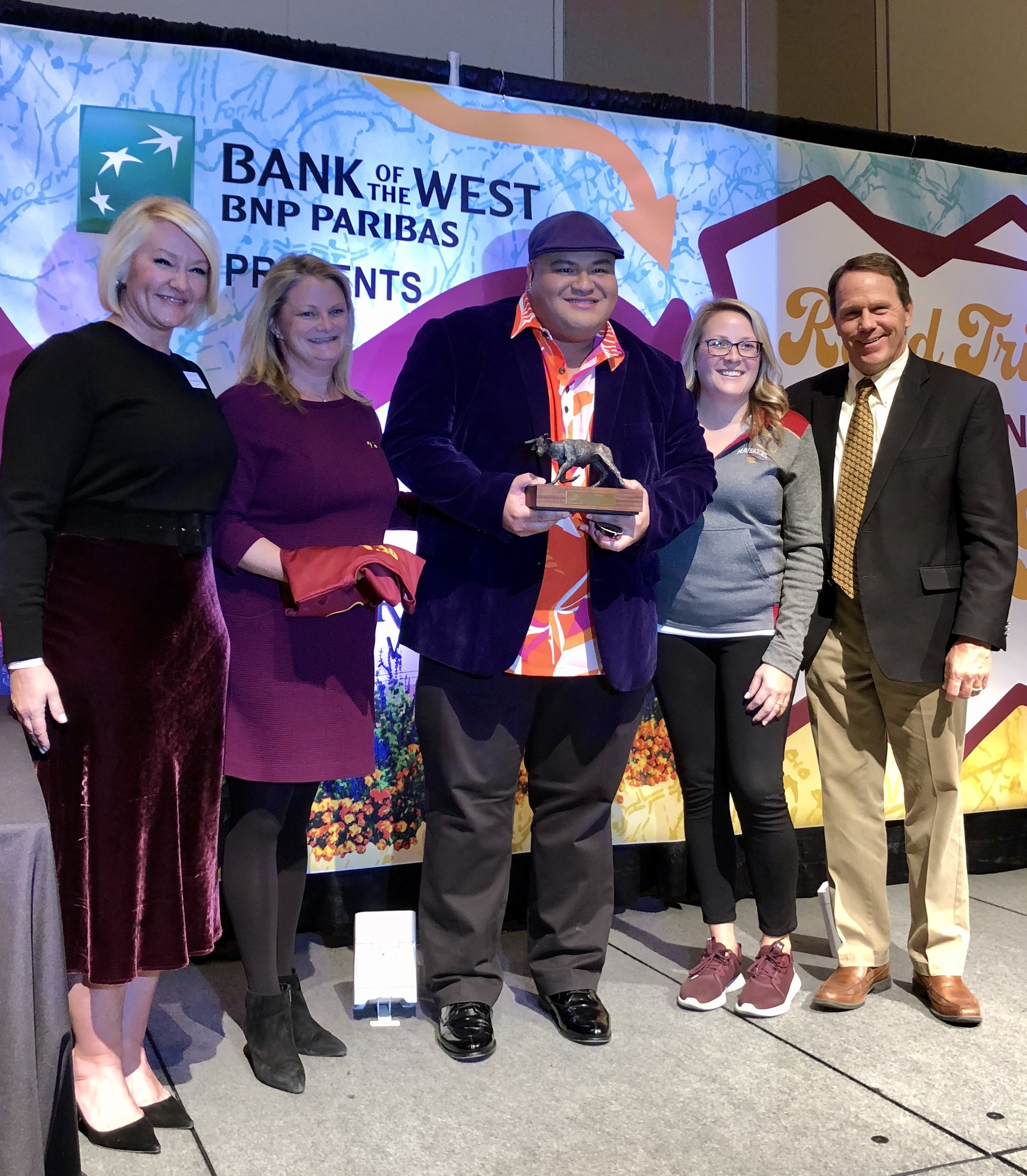
Kalani Pe'a accepts Distinguished Alumni Award from CMU President Tim Foster & Staff - 2019

On February 18, 2017, the Council of the County of Hawaiʻi congratulated Peʻa with a proclamation. The council said, "Your Grammy award inspires members of the next generation to work hard, dream big, and express love and joy in all that they do. By sharing your gift with others, you will ensure the perpetuation of ‘Ōlelo Hawai’i Hawaiian Language." On the same date, Harry Kim, the Mayor of County of Hawaii, awarded Kalani with a Proclamation. Kim said, "Pe’a's victory is to further bring awareness and appreciation of Hawaiian language and culture far beyond our Hawaiian islands." On Oct. 8, 2017, Pe’a was given a Commendation by Alan Arakawa, mayor, Maui County. "You are to be commended for your hard work and dedication in perpetuating the Hawaiian culture through your musical artistry. You have brought honor to the State of Hawaii, the Maui County and our entire community," Arakawa said. The Senate and legislators at the Hawaii State Capitol in Honolulu also acknowledged Kalani with a resolution establishing Feb. 18, 2017 as "Kalani Peʻa Day." This "Kalani Peʻa Day" was given to Pe’a during his homecoming concert at his alma mater at Ke Kula o Nawahiokalaniopuu – The Hawaiian Language Laboratory School in Keaʻau, Hawaiʻi. Another resolution was created to honor Pe’a for this achievement by David Ige, governor of Hawai’i and the Maui County for embarking a historical moment for the Hawaiian music industry and music worldwide. On May 6, 2019, Peʻa was honored by the County of Maui and the Mayor of Maui County, Michael Victorino for winning his second Grammy Award.

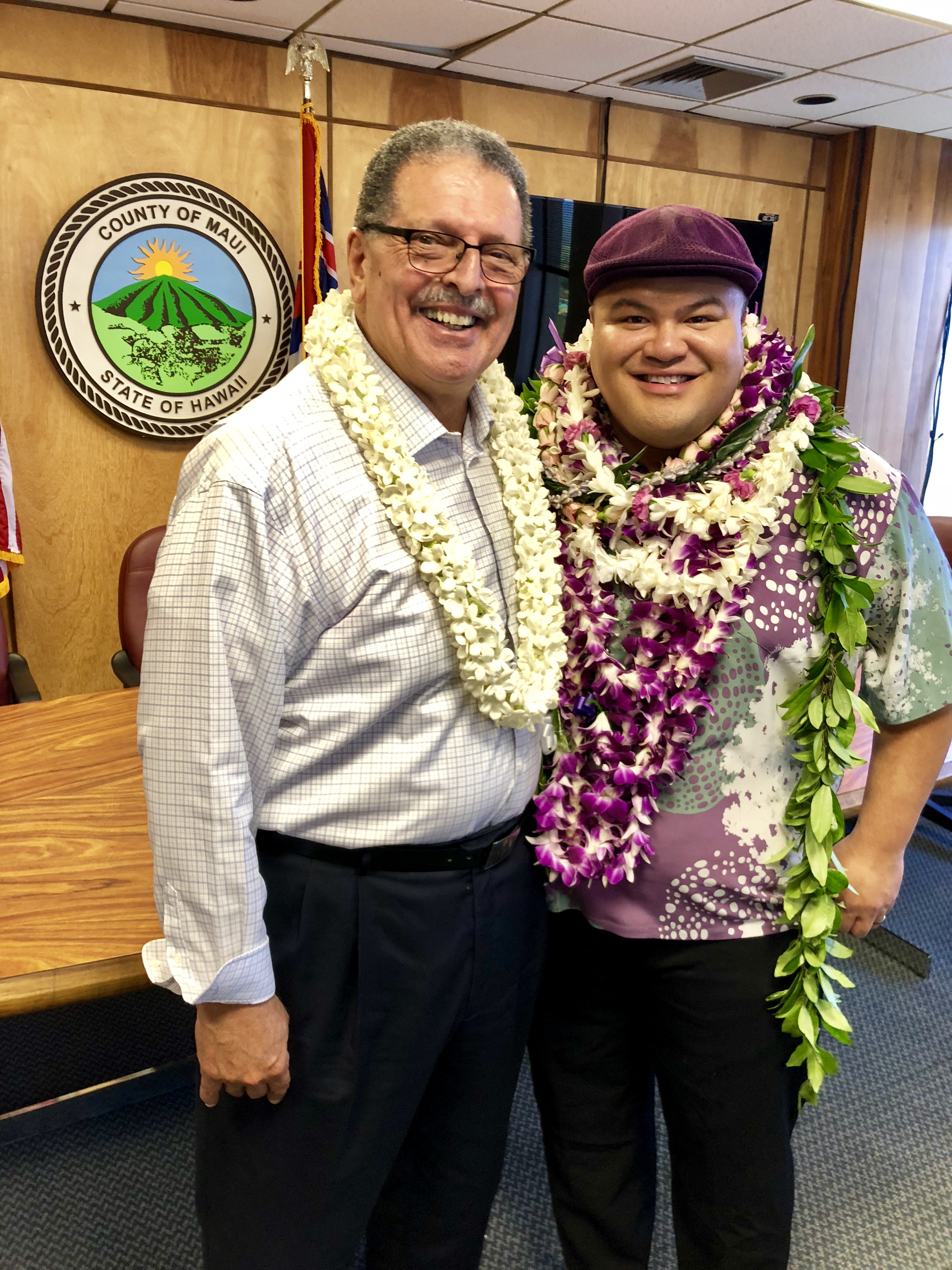
Maui Mayor Michael Victorino & Kalani Peʻa May 2019

In 2019 Pe'a received the distinguished alumni award from Colorado Mesa University. The university interviewed Pe'a and he said that the education he received there helped him on the detour path in life and music. Pe'a also said that while attending college he first planned to graduate with a major in music but ended up getting his degree in mass communication.

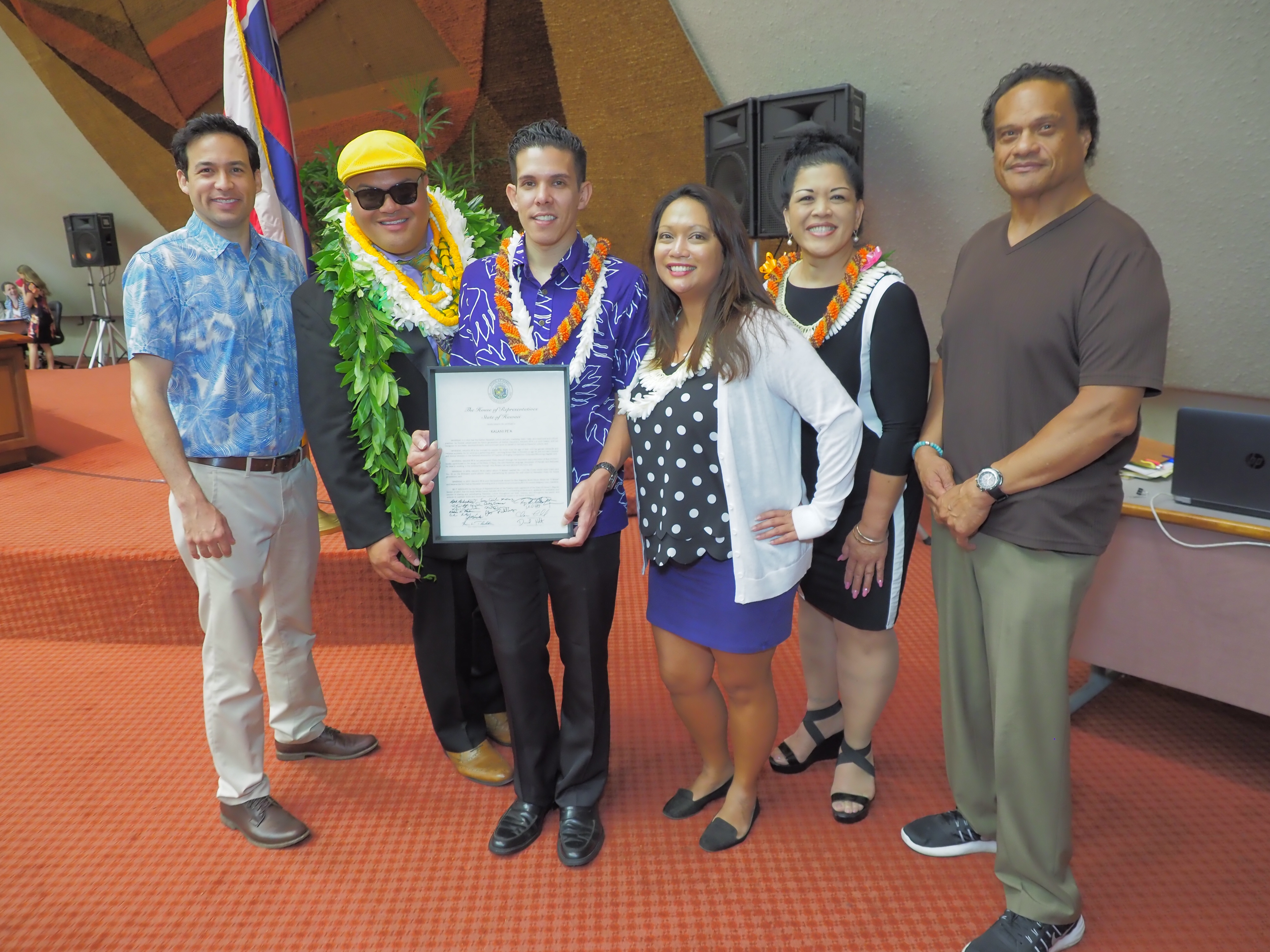
Kalani Peʻa Honored at Hawaii State Capitol 2017

== Charity ==
Pe'a's grandmother has Alzheimers. He was interviewed by KHON2 News and said that "Many families are ashamed to say they have family members affected by it. I really want to encourage the importance of not being ashamed to talk about it, to ask for help — advice and help from the Alzheimer’s Association. And it’s okay to cry on somebody’s shoulder.”

Pe'a donates a portion of his live shows towards programs supporting Alzheimer's patients and their caregivers.

== Discography ==
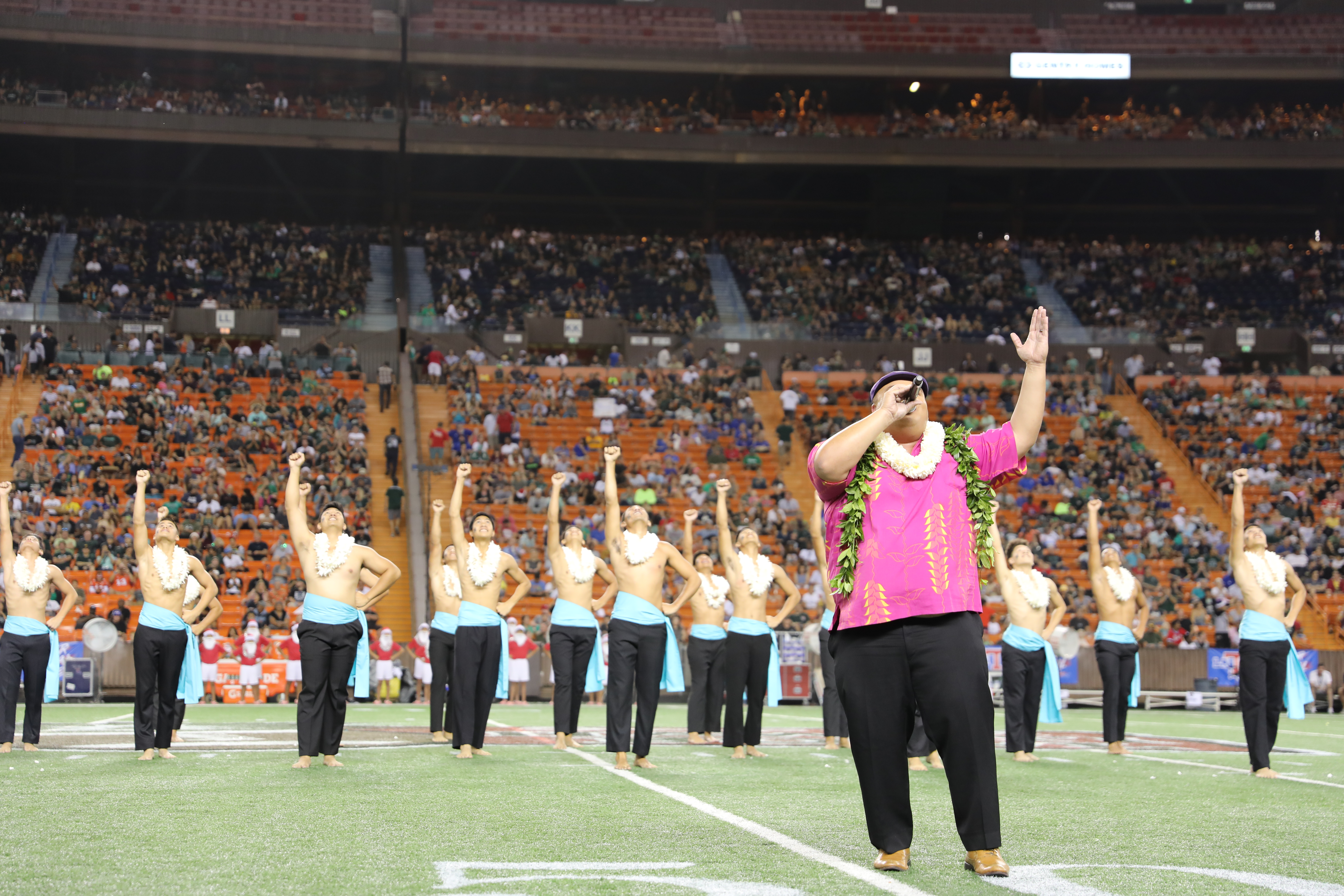
Kalani Peʻa Hawaii Bowl December 2018

=== Solo albums ===
- E Walea (2016)
- No 'Ane'i (2018)
- Kau Ka Pe'a (2021)
- Purple Hawaiian Christmas (2022)
- Kuini (album) (2024)

=== Singles ===
- "Kanakaloka" (2017)
- "O Holy Night" (2020)
- "Kuini (Kuʻu Lei Aloha)" (2023)

=== Contributions ===
- Sung with Henry Kapono on "All In Love Is Fair", from The Songs of C&K (2018)
- ʻŌpae Ē, Hawaiian Lullaby (2019)
- I Love You (E Pili Mau), Aloha & Mahalo II (2020)

== Awards ==
=== Grammy Awards ===
Year (edition)	Nominated Work	Category	Result	Ref
2017 (59th)	E Walea	Grammy Award for Best Regional Roots Music Album	Won	
2019 (61st)	No 'Ane'i	Grammy Award for Best Regional Roots Music Album	Won	
2022 (64th)	Kau Ka Pe'a	Grammy Award for Best Regional Roots Music Album	Won	
2025 (67th)	Kuini	Grammy Award for Best Regional Roots Music Album	Won	

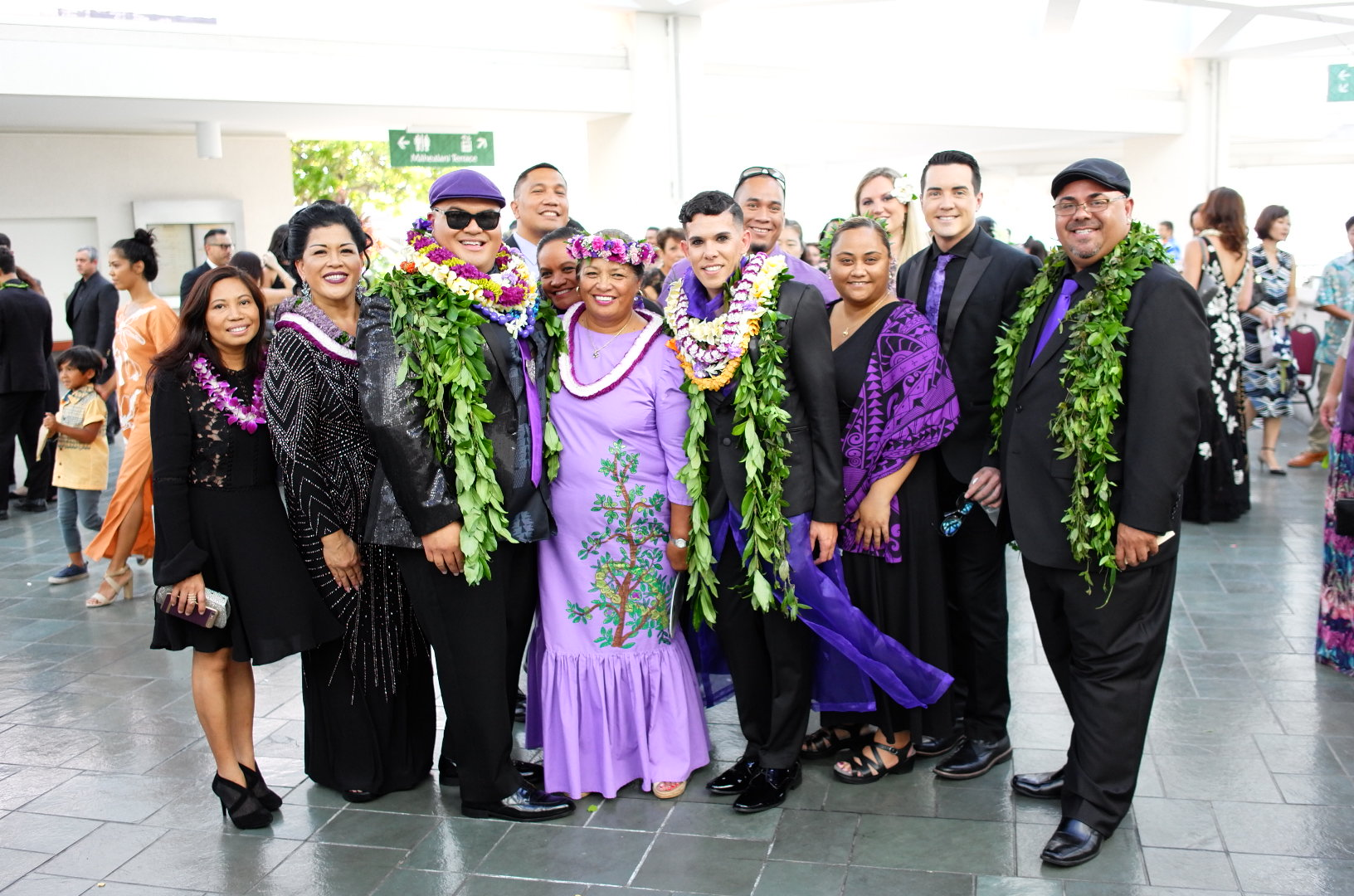
Kalani Peʻa and family. 2017 Nā Hōkū Hanohano Awards

=== Na Hoku Hanohano Awards ===
Year	Nominated Work	Category	Result	Ref
2025	Kuini (album)	Hawaiian Album of the Year	Won	
2025	Ka Na'i Aupuni Feat. Jake Shimabukuro & Kamehameha Schools Maui Hawaiian Ensemble	Hawaiian Music Video of the Year (Director - Antonio Agosto Music Producers - Kalani Pe'a, Wailau Ryder, Michael Casil & Allan B. Cool-Pe'a)	Won	
2025	Kuini (album)	Liner Notes (Kalani Pe'a & Riann Fujiwara)	Won	
2025	Kuini (album)	Hawaiian Language Performance	Nominated	
2025	Graphic Design (Daryl Fujiwara)	Kuini (album)	Nominated	
2025	Hawaiian Music Video of the Year	Ka Ua Paʻūpili	Nominated	
2025	Kuini (album)	Album of the Year	Nominated	
2025	Kuini (album)	Male Vocalist of the Year	Nominated	
2025	Kuini (album)	Hawaiian Engineering (Michael Casil)	Nominated	
2024	Kuini (Kuʻu Lei Aloha)	Hawaiian Single of the Year	Nominated	
2024	Kuini (Kuʻu Lei Aloha)	Hawaiian Video of the Year	Nominated	
2023	Purple Hawaiian Christmas	Contemporary Album of the Year	Won	
2023	Purple Hawaiian Christmas	Male Vocalist of the Year	Nominated	
2023	Purple Hawaiian Christmas	Song of the Year - Composers Kalani Peʻa & Wailau Ryder	Nominated	
2023	Purple Hawaiian Christmas	General Engineering - Michael Casil I-Vibe Productions	Nominated	
2022	Kau Ka Pe'a - by Kalani Pe’a (Pe’a Records & Entertainment) Kalani Pe‘a, Dave Tucciarone & Allan B. Cool, Producers	Album Of The Year - Producer	Nominated	
2022	Kau Ka Pe'a - by Kalani Pe’a (Pe’a Records & Entertainment)	Hawaiian Language Performance	Nominated	
2022	Kau Ka Pe'a - by Kalani Pe’a (Pe’a Records & Entertainment)	Graphic Design - Daryl Fujiwara	Nominated	
2022	Kau Ka Pe'a - by Kalani Pe’a (Pe’a Records & Entertainment)	Liner Notes of the Year - T. Ilihia Gionson	Nominated	
2022	Kau Ka Pe'a - by Kalani Pe’a (Pe’a Records & Entertainment)	Contemporary Acoustic Album Of The Year	Nominated	
2022	Kau Ka Pe'a - by Kalani Pe’a (Pe’a Records & Entertainment)	Song Of The Year	Won	
2022	Kau Ka Pe'a - by Kalani Pe’a (Pe’a Records & Entertainment)	Male Vocalist Of The Year	Won	
2022	Kau Ka Pe'a	Hawaiian Music Video Of The Year - Music Producer	Nominated	
2022	"Kaniakapupu"	Hawaiian Music Video Of The Year - Music Producer	Nominated	
2022	"‘A‘ahu Poli‘ahu"	Hawaiian Music Video Of The Year - Music Producer	Nominated	
2022	Kau Ka Pe'a	Hawaiian Music Video Of The Year - Artist	Nominated	
2022	"Kaniakapupu"	Hawaiian Music Video Of The Year - Artist	Nominated	
2022	"‘A‘ahu Poli‘ahu"	Hawaiian Music Video Of The Year - Artist	Nominated	
2022	Kau Ka Pe'a - by Kalani Pe’a (Pe’a Records & Entertainment) Kalani Pe‘a, Dave Tucciarone & Allan B. Cool, Producers	Album Of The Year - Artist	Nominated	
2021	"O Holy Night"	Christmas Single Of The Year	Won	
2021	"O Holy Night"	Music Video Of The Year	Nominated	
2021	"I Love You (E Pili Mau)"	Hawaiian Music Video Of The Year	Nominated	
2019	No 'Ane'i	Album Of The Year	Nominated	
2019	No 'Ane'i	Male Vocalist Of The Year	Nominated	
2019	No 'Ane'i	Island Music Album Of The Year	Nominated	
2019	No 'Ane'i	Hawaiian Engineering - Dave Tucciarone	Nominated	
2019	No 'Ane'i	Graphic Design - Daryl Fujiwara	Nominated	
2019	"Hilo March"	Music Video Of The Year	Nominated	
2018	"Kanakaloka"	Hawaiian Single Of The Year	Nominated	
2018	"E Nā Kini"	Music Video Of The Year	Nominated	
2017	E Walea	Contemporary Album of the Year	Won	
2017	E Walea	Album Of The Year	Nominated	
2017	E Walea	Male Vocalist Of The Year	Nominated	
2017	E Walea	Most Promising Artist Of The Year	Nominated	
2017	E Walea	Graphic Design - Daryl Fujiwara	Nominated	
2017	E Walea	Favorite Entertainer Of The Year	Nominated	
2017	E Walea	Hawaiian Language Performance	Nominated	
2017	"He Lei Aloha (No Hilo)"	Song Of The Year - Kalani Pe'a and Devin Kamealoha Forrest	Nominated	
2017	"He Lei Aloha (No Hilo)"	Haku Mele Award - Kalani Pe'a and Devin Kamealoha Forrest	Nominated	
