= Hoʻokena =

Hoʻokena may refer to:

- Hoʻokena (group), Hawaiian music trio
- Hoʻokena beach, beach and village in Kona, Hawaii
