= Cha Wa =

American funk band

- Origin: New Orleans, Louisiana, U.S.
- Genres: Funk, Second Line, Jam band
- Years active: 2014–present
- Members: Joe Gelini (drum kit); Honey Banister (vocals); Tajh Derosier (saxophone and vocals); Rik Fletcher (keys); Trevor Nathan (guitar)
- Past members: Thaddeus "Peanut" Ramsey (vocals); Devon Taylor (tuba); Spyboy Kevin Wallace (vocals); Sam Dickey (guitar); Raja Kassis (guitar); Haruka Kikuchi (trombone); Eric "Bogey" Gordon (trumpet); Edward "Juicey" Jackson (trombone); Clifton "Spug" Smith (tuba); Isaac Eady (bass guitar); Ari Teitel (guitar); Joseph "José" Maize (trombone); Andrew "Andriu" Yanovski (keyboard); Aurélien Barnes (trumpet); Spyboy J’Wan Boudreaux (vocals); Second Chief Joseph Boudreaux Jr. (vocals); TJ Norris (bass guitar); Stephen Gladney (tenor saxophone); Chris Cotton (trumpet); Seizo Shibayama (guitar); Desmond Provost (tuba); Marlon Jordan (trumpet); Syrajh Hamilton (vocals); Wes Anderson (trombone)
- Website: chawaband.com

Cha Wa is an American Mardi Gras Indian funk band based out of New Orleans, Louisiana. The name Cha Wa is a slang phrase used by Mardi Gras Indian tribes, meaning "we're comin' for ya" or "here we come." Frontman Honey Bannister is known for dressing in traditional Mardi Gras Indian clothing during performances, including intricately designed headdresses. Cha Wa has released four albums, Funk n Feathers in 2016, Spyboy in 2018, My People in 2021, and Rise Up in 2025.

== Early career and Funk 'n Feathers (2014-2016) ==
Cha Wa was formed in 2014 by bandleader and drummer, Joe Gelini. Gelini first heard of Mardi Gras Indians while he was attending the Berklee School of Music in Boston. During his time in Boston, he went to see a performance by Idris Muhammad, a New Orleans-born jazz drummer. Muhammed was performing in traditional Mardi Gras style, which piqued Gelini's interest. Muhammed later gave Gelini a lesson in Mardi Gras style which pushed Gelini to move to New Orleans after graduation. Gelini quickly became involved with the Mardi Gras Indian community in New Orleans. He began attending practice rehearsals for Mardi Gras marches, where he met Monk Boudreaux, the grandfather and father (respectively) of J'wan and Joseph Boudreaux Jr., Cha Wa's future frontmen. Monk Boudreaux is also known as Big Chief of the Golden Eagles. Gelini's practices alongside Monk Boudreaux quickly turned into performances with him.

Cha Wa's first album Funk 'n' Feathers was released in April 2016 on the band's own UPT Music label. The 10-song record combines a mix of original tunes with covers of New Orleans funk classics.

== Success and Spyboy (2017-2020) ==
Gelini met Monk's grandson J'Wan Boudreaux while Boudreaux was still attending high school. Soon after, J'wan joined Cha Wa's lineup as the lead vocalist and frontman. Boudreaux is the spyboy of his Mardi Gras Indian tribe, a position that entails warning the Chief of approaching rival tribes during parade processions. The band aptly named their second album Spyboy. With Spyboy, the band aimed to give traditional New Orleans music a modern twist. In Gelini's words, "We wanted to take the roots of what we love about New Orleans brass band music and Mardi Gras Indian music and then voice it in our own way". The album was produced by Galactic's Ben Ellman and features special guests Big Chief Monk Boudreaux (The Wild Magnolias) and Nigel Hall (Lettuce, Nth Power, and Danica Hart).

The track "Chapters" was written by J'wan Boudreaux and explores the struggles he faced being raised in a single parent household. In "J'Wans Story", Boudreaux explains how and why Mardi Gras Indian culture developed. Gelini and Monk Boudreaux teamed up to write "Visible Means of Support", which chronicles Monk Boudreaux's experience with vagrancy laws in the city that primarily affected African-American men.

In 2018, Spyboy was nominated for a Grammy Award in the Best Regional Roots Music Album category. Cha Wa was nominated in several categories at the 2019 OffBeat Best of the Beat Awards.

In early 2019, Cha Wa performed at GlobalFest. In a review of the festival, Rolling Stone explained Cha Wa's performance as "a portable Mardi Gras dance party". That spring, the band played several shows at SXSW, including GlobalFest's official showcase at Palm Door on Sixth and the Brooklyn Bowl Family Reunion at the Historic Scoot Inn. A few weeks later, the group was featured at a celebration of 50 years of New Orleans music and culture by Relix Magazine at the New Orleans Jazz Museum. Summer 2019 saw Cha Wa play several large music festivals including the 29th annual High Sierra Music Festival, Montreal International Jazz Festival, and the Philadelphia Folk Festival.

On September 26, 2019, the band released "Wildman" as a standalone single, written by former guitarist/musical director Ari Teitel and former lead vocalist J'Wan Boudreaux. Relix described the song as "an old-school, funk-driven tribute to the most hot-blooded Mardi Gras Indian Tribal member, who intimidates and 'opens up a hole' in the crowd of people for the Big Chief to emerge on Mardi Gras Morning. This song evokes the infectious energy of the Wildman which you can feel on the streets on Mardi Gras Day."

In 2019, Joseph Boudreaux Jr., Monk's son and Second Chief of the Golden Eagles tribe, replaced his nephew J'wan as the band's lead vocalist and frontman for a short period, before leaving Cha Wa along with Aurelien Barnes, Joseph Maize, Ari Teitel, Andriu Yanovski, TJ Norris and Stephen J. Gladney. The departed members formed The Rumble ft. Chief Joseph Boudreaux, earning their own Grammy nomination in 2023.

ESPN featured Cha Wa on their national broadcast on December 16, 2019, playing the ESPN Monday Night Football theme and one of Cha Wa's own songs. A few months later (September 13, 2020), the New Orleans Saints featured them on their official pregame show with a live performance of Cha Wa's original song "Saints Go Get 'Em". Lincoln featured a Cha Wa performance of an unreleased song at the Hotel Peter and Paul for their "Chart Your Course" Campaign with Cas Haley.

On September 3, 2020, Cha Wa released a remixed version of "Visible Means of Support", a track from Spyboy, along with a video chronicling the rise of the Black Lives Matter movement. The video won an Offbeat Magazine Best of the Beat Award for 2020's Music Video of the Year.

== My People, Rise Up, and recent events (2021-present) ==
The band's follow up album to Spyboy was My People, which was released on April 2, 2021, on Single Lock Records. Andrew Block engineered and co-produced the record with Teitel. The band has garnered significant press surrounding the release, including an appearance on Good Morning America, Jazz FM (UK), and BBC 6. The album was again nominated for a Grammy in the Regional Roots Album category.

My People received a Grammy nomination in the Best Regional Roots Music Album category in 2021. In 2021, the band took home an awardfor Best Music Video at Offbeat's Best of the Beat Awards for Visible Means of Support (No Justice, No Peace Remix), filmed by Jonathan Isaac Jackson.

The band appeared for a performance and interview on Good Morning America the week of Mardi Gras 2021 and has appeared on numerous morning shows since, including Good Day Louisiana around the release of their album 'Rise Up' in 2025.

In early 2022, PBS show Bluegrass Underground featured a Cha Wa performance from Cumberland Caverns. Later that year, the band's song Ooh Na Nay was featured in the New Orleans-focused feature film "Causeway" starring Jennifer Lawrence. A month later, the band recorded a live EP at Brooklyn Bowl in New York, which was released in mid 2023.

Cha Wa released their fourth studio album 'Rise Up' on August 29, 2025 – the 20 year anniversary of Hurricane Katrina, celebrating their home city's resilience.

== Discography ==
- Funk 'n Feathers (UPT Music, 2014)
- Spyboy (UPT Music, 2018)
- My People (Single Lock Records, 2021)
- Rise Up (Gallatin Street Records, 2025)

== Awards and nominations ==
Year	Nominated Work	Category	Award	Result
2018	Spyboy	Best Regional Roots Album	Grammy Awards	Nominated
2021	My People	Best Regional Roots Album	Grammy Awards	Nominated
