= Robin Barnes =

American jazz singer and fitness leader

Robin Barnes is an American jazz singer, vocalist and fitness leader from New Orleans, Louisiana, United States, best known for her debut album "Louisiana Love" released in 2026 and her jazz EP "Songbird Sessions" released in 2016. Barnes has a alto-to-first-soprano singing range. She has recorded and performed with artists including Big Freedia, Soul Rebels, Ha Sizzle, Ivan Neville, Louis Michot and Rockin' Dopsie Jr.

In 2027, Barnes will represent Louisiana at the Rose Parade in Pasadena, CA as the mid-parade entertainer and Louisiana State Music Ambassador.

== Early life and education ==
Barnes was born in New Orleans, Louisiana and grew up in the Lower Ninth Ward around a family of musicians, including Dave Bartholomew. Her ancestry includes Creole, Cajun, Nova Scotian, French and African. A ninth generation Louisianan, Barnes came from gospel and jazz roots, and started singing at 6 in her church choir and she played tambourine in her father's band. After a solo performance of “Ave Maria," she decided she wanted to be a singer. At 17, Hurricane Katrina displaced her family.

Barnes holds a bachelor's degree from the University of New Orleans in business management and a master's degree in business administration.

== Career ==
=== Music ===
In 2011, she made music her full-time career. Barnes’ first gig was in the Hotel Monteleone; she held residencies at Hotel Monteleone and Windsor Court. Barnes currently has weekly Thursday residency of Da Lovebirds (the duo formed by Robin Barnes and her husband/bassist Pat Casey) at the Kimpton Hotel Fontenot’s Peacock Room.

Barnes has performed multiple times at New Orleans Jazz & Heritage Festival, including closing the Lagniappe Stage in 2026. She has grown in popularity since her debut in the United States and in Europe. She has performed throughout Europe, Asia and Australia, including at the Royal Opera House in London. Barnes has been named the “Songbird of New Orleans" by several media outlets. Barnes won “Favorite New Orleans Musician” by New Orleans magazine as well as Gambit Magazine's artist to watch in 2015.

She released five songs on her Jazz EP Songbird Sessions on Aug. 26, 2016 through Rhythm Elevation Records. The album was made with bassist Pat Casey. Robin cites influences including Allen Toussaint and Irma Thomas. Percussionists Riley and Powell and guitarists Masakowski and Danny Abel also appear. Songbird Sessions debuted at number 5 on the Traditional Jazz Albums Billboard Charts. Her album was also number 8 on the Current Jazz Albums chart.

Barnes released her debut album, “Louisiana Love,” on May 1, 2026 to honor her ninth-generation Louisiana heritage. The album features zydeco, Cajun and Creole French influences with New Orleans Jazz and funk. It features guest collaborations from Louisiana artists including Ivan Neville; The Soul Rebels; Mardi Gras Indians Bruce Sunpie Barnes, Monk Boudreaux and J’Wan Boudreaux; Rockin’ Dopsie Jr., Dwayne Dopsie and Rusty Metoyer; Louis Michot and Jourdan Thibodeaux; Cedric Watson; Herlin Riley; Drake Leblanc; Ha Sizzle, and Big Freedia. The album was nominated for the 2027 Grammy Award for Best Regional Roots Music Album.

== Activism and fitness work ==
In 2013, after returning from her first international tour, she was diagnosed with a rare kidney infection. After the diagnosis, Barnes founded Move Ya Brass, a New Orleans-centric fitness lifestyle group. The Make Your Move Foundation, the nonprofit arm of Move Ya Brass, supports free fitness classes for youth and the New Orleans community. Barnes was featured on Gambit's 40 under 40 in 2014 for her workout wear.

Barnes is the At-Large Director on The University of New Orleans International Alumni Board and serves as a member on The Beautiful Foundation, serving uplifting young women.

== Personal life ==
Barnes is married to bass player Pat Casey; they perform together as the duo Da Lovebirds. She is Catholic and has two daughters, who perform with her on the song “Dey Say Run.”

In 2025, a tumor was discovered in Barnes' leg, for which she underwent surgery to have it removed.

== Discography ==
=== Albums ===
- Louisiana Love (2026)

=== Singles and EPs ===
- Me (2013)
- Songbird Sessions (2016)
- Celebrate Around the World (2017)
- You Give Me (2019)
- In God We Trust (2025)
