= Hawaiian Lullaby =

Studio album by Haku Collective (various artists)
- Released: May 24, 2019
- Recorded: 2019
- Studio: Blue Planet Sound
- Genres: Hawaiian, folk, world
- Length: 40 Minutes
- Label: Haku Records
- Producers: Kimie Miner, Imua Garza

Hawaiian Lullaby is a compilation album by artists in the Haku Collective. It was released on May 24, 2019.

== Production ==
The Hawaiian Lullaby project was put together by singer/songwriter/producer Kimie. She was inspired to record this album while raising her first child and being pregnant with her second child. Hawaiian Lullaby is a 13-track collaborative album featuring musicians of Hawaii. On the album they share their favorite children lullabies and other favorites in both the English and Hawaiian languages. "You Are My Sunshine" was a song Kimie Miner would always sing to her baby while pregnant and even after giving birth. Miner was the main album producer for the record. Imua Garza was also a producer on the project.

== Awards ==
Hawaiian Lullaby was nominated for a Grammy Award in December 2019, for Best Regional Roots Music Album. In October 2020 the album won a Na Hoku Hanohano Award for Compilation Album of the Year. The award went to the album producers Kimie Miner and Imua Garza.

== Critical reception ==
Hawaiian Lullaby hit #6 in Billboard's World & Kid Albums charts, and #8 in the Compilation Albums charts. Hawaii News Now said the album ranked in the top spot in June 2019. Berger, a writer from the Star Advertiser wrote in an album review that many of the musical gems on the album sparkle.

== Track listing ==
1. "Aloha Kakahiaka" by Haku Collective 0:45
2. "Three Little Birds (‘Ekolu Manu Li’ili’i)" by The Green 3:13
3. "Pūpū Hinuhinu" by Paula Fuga 2:54
4. "You Are My Sunshine (This Little Light of Mine)" by Kimie Miner 3:46
5. "Hawaiian Lullaby" by Josh Tatofi 4:04
6. "ʻŌpae ē" by Kalani Pe'a 3:14
7. "He Aloha Mele" by Imua Garza 2:57
8. "True Colors (Kou ʻano Kūʻiʻo)" by Anuhea 3:29
9. "Kawelokiliwehi (Mahina)" by Kimie Miner 1:06
10. "By Your Side" by Kimie Miner 3:55
11. "Twinkle, Twinkle, Little Star (ʻimoʻimo Hōkū Iki)" by Kapena 2:59
12. "Ke Ao Nani" by Kaumakaiwa Kanakaʻole 3:16
13. "Songbird" by Kimie Miner 4:33
