= Kuini (album) =

Studio album by Kalani Peʻa
- Released: July 26, 2024
- Recorded: 2024
- Studio: iVibe Productions Maui Hawaii
- Genre: Hawaiian, folk, world
- Label: Pe'a Records & Entertainment

Kalani Peʻa chronology
Kau Ka Pe'a (2021)	Kuini (2024)

Kuini is a studio album by Kalani Peʻa, released in 2024. This album marks the 5th studio album release for Peʻa. The album honors influential women in Peʻa's life and also includes a tribute to Lahaina Maui. The album also includes songs that honor lei makers of the island of Niihau. The album was recorded in Kula on the island of Maui.

== Awards ==
Kuini won the 2025 Grammy Award for Best Regional Roots Music Album, making it Pe'a's fourth win the same category.

== Track listing ==
1. Ululani Nui - 2:17
2. Kuini (Kuʻu Lei Aloha) - 3:46
3. Ka Ua Paʻūpili - 3:39
4. Ka Naʻi Aupuni Feat. Jake Shimabukuro & Kamehameha Schools Maui Ensemble - 4:02
5. Waimea Kamahaʻo - 3:43
6. Hoʻonanea - 4:08
7. Ka Wahine O Ka Lua - 2:42
8. Malu Ulu Aʻo Lele - 4:03
9. Mauna Kilohana - 2:38
10. Tiare Maohi Medley - 3:10
11. Kōkeʻe - 3:40
