= New Orleans Nightcrawlers =

American regional roots group

New Orleans Nightcrawlers are an American regional roots group, based in the New Orleans area. They were founded in 1994 by pianist Tom McDermott, sousaphonist Matt Perrine and trumpeter Kevin Clark. In addition, original members of the band included trumpeter Barney Floyd, Frank Oxley, Mark Morris, and Peter Kaplan on percussion, Craig Klein and Rick Trolsen on trombones, and saxophonists Eric Traub, Ken "Snakebite" Jacobs and Jason Mingledorff and trumpeter Satoru Ohashi. More recent members of the band have included saxophonist Brent Rose and drummer Tanio Hingle and Kerry “fatman” Hunter. Originally modeled on the Dirty Dozen Brass Band, the Crawlers brought something new to the New Orleans brass band scene with their sophisticated arrangements. Henry Butler, Evan Christopher, and Troy (Trombone Shorty) and Bruce Hornsby have performed/recorded with the group. They have toured Japan, Brazil, several countries in Europe and much of America, and have released five albums. Their 2020 album, Atmosphere, won the Grammy Award for Best Regional Roots Music Album.

== Awards and honors ==
=== Grammy Awards ===
Year	Category	Work nominated	Result	Ref.
2021	Best Regional Roots Music Album	Atmosphere	Won	
2024	Best Regional Roots Music Album	Too Much to Hold	Nominated	

=== OffBeat's Best of The Beat Awards ===
Year	Category	Work nominated	Result	Ref.
1996	Best Traditional Jazz Album	New Orleans Nightcrawlers	Won	
1996	Best Album Artwork	New Orleans Nightcrawlers	Won	
2000	Best Brass Band Album	Live at the Old Point	Won	
2000	Best Album Artwork	Live at the Old Point (with Scott Saltzman, photographer)	Won	
2020	Best Traditional Jazz Album	Atmosphere	Won	
2021-22	Best Brass Band		Won	
2023	Best Brass Band Album	Too Much to Hold	Won	

== Discography ==
- New Orleans Nightcrawlers (Rounder Records)
- Funknicity (Rounder Records)
- Live at the Old Point (Independent)
- Slither Slice (Threadhead Records)
- Atmosphere (Independent)
- Too Much To Hold (Independent)
