= E Walea =

Studio album by Kalani Pe'a
- Released: August 5, 2016
- Recorded: 2016
- Studio: Seventh Wave Production
- Genres: Hawaiian, folk, world
- Label: Kalani Pe'a Music LLC

Kalani Pe'a chronology
E Walea (2016)	No 'Ane'i (2018)

E Walea is the debut album by Hawaiian singer Kalani Pe'a. It was released on August 5, 2016.

== Production ==
E Walea includes seven original Hawaiian music compositions written or co-written by Pe'a. The album was recorded in Honolulu, Hawaii, produced by Na Hoku Hanohano Award-winner Dave Tucciarone and co-produced by Kamakoa Lindsey-Asing and Allan B. Cool. The English translation of E Walea is "relaxing at ease with the gentle voices of the birds". AXS wrote, "Kalani Pe'a's music isn't your typical island fare; rather, the Hawaiian singer-songwriter plays with the traditional format with brazen vocals, uncommon compositions and clever reworkings of unlikely hits (like "You Are So Beautiful" and "Always and Forever")." The album title came from Pe'a's nephew's name Kamali‘ikanekuikekaipu‘oluwaleaokalani.

== Awards ==
E Walea was nominated for a Grammy Award in December 2016, and won the award in February 2017, for Best Regional Roots Music Album. Pe'a made history, becoming the first Hawaiian music recording artist to win in that category. It was the first time in the history of the category that the award had been won by a Native Hawaiian recording artist. It was also the first time since the category was created in 2011 that the award had not been won by a Louisiana-based Cajun or zydeco album. E Walea also won the 2017 Na Hoku Hanohano Award for Contemporary Album of the Year, making Pe'a the first artist to win both a Grammy Award and Na Hoku Hanohano Award for the same album. E Walea peaked at number 11 on the Billboard charts under World Music Albums.

== Track listing ==
1. "He Lei Aloha (No Hilo)" – 2:49
2. "E Nā Kini" – 3:45
3. "He Wehi Aloha" – 3:35
4. "Hanalei I Ka Pilimoe" – 3:09
5. "You Are So Beautiful" – 2:36
6. "Makawalu Ke Ānuenue" – 3:42
7. "Always And Forever" – 4:27
8. "Noho Paipai" – 2:54
9. "Eō Lononuiākea (Mele Oli Aloha No Kona)" – 1:03
10. "Ku‘u Poli‘ahu" – 3:43
11. "Oli Mahalo No Maui" – 1:27
12. "Nani A Maika‘i" – 2:51
