= Grammy Award for Best Regional Roots Music Album =

Award category

Grammy Award for Best Regional Roots Album
- Awarded for: quality vocal or instrumental regional forms of american roots music albums
- Country: United States
- Presented by: National Academy of Recording Arts and Sciences
- First award: 2012
- Currently held by: Various Artists – A Tribute to the King of Zydeco (2026)
- Website: grammy.com

The Grammy Award for Best Regional Roots Music Album is an award presented at the Grammy Awards, a ceremony that was established in 1958 as the Gramophone Awards, to recording artists for releasing albums in the regionally based traditional American music, including Hawaiian, Native American, polka, zydeco and Cajun music genres. Honors in several categories are presented at the ceremony annually by the National Academy of Recording Arts and Sciences of the United States to "honor artistic achievement, technical proficiency and overall excellence in the recording industry, without regard to album sales or chart position".

The category was introduced in 2012 in which the previous Best Hawaiian Music Album, Best Zydeco or Cajun Music Album and Best Native American Music Album categories were combined. The change was the result of a major overhaul of Grammy categories, announced in April 2011. The new category also recognizes other American roots forms, such as polka, whose own Grammy category was discontinued in 2009. In 2021, the category added the inclusion of Go-go music, and in 2024 it was announced that conjunto would be recognized under the category starting in 2025. It was moved from the Grammy Award for Best Música Mexicana Album (including Tejano) category, as it is regarded as an American Roots genre rather than a Mexican music genre.

For the 2026 Grammy season, the category description is as follows: "This category recognizes recordings of cultural roots styles of music, including Cajun, Hawaiian, Indigenous/Native American, Second Line brass band, Polka, Zydeco, Go-go, Swamp Pop, Conjunto, and others, with production and sensibilities distinctly different from a pop approach".

Hawaiian musician Kalani Pe'a holds the record for most wins in the category with four.

== Recipients ==
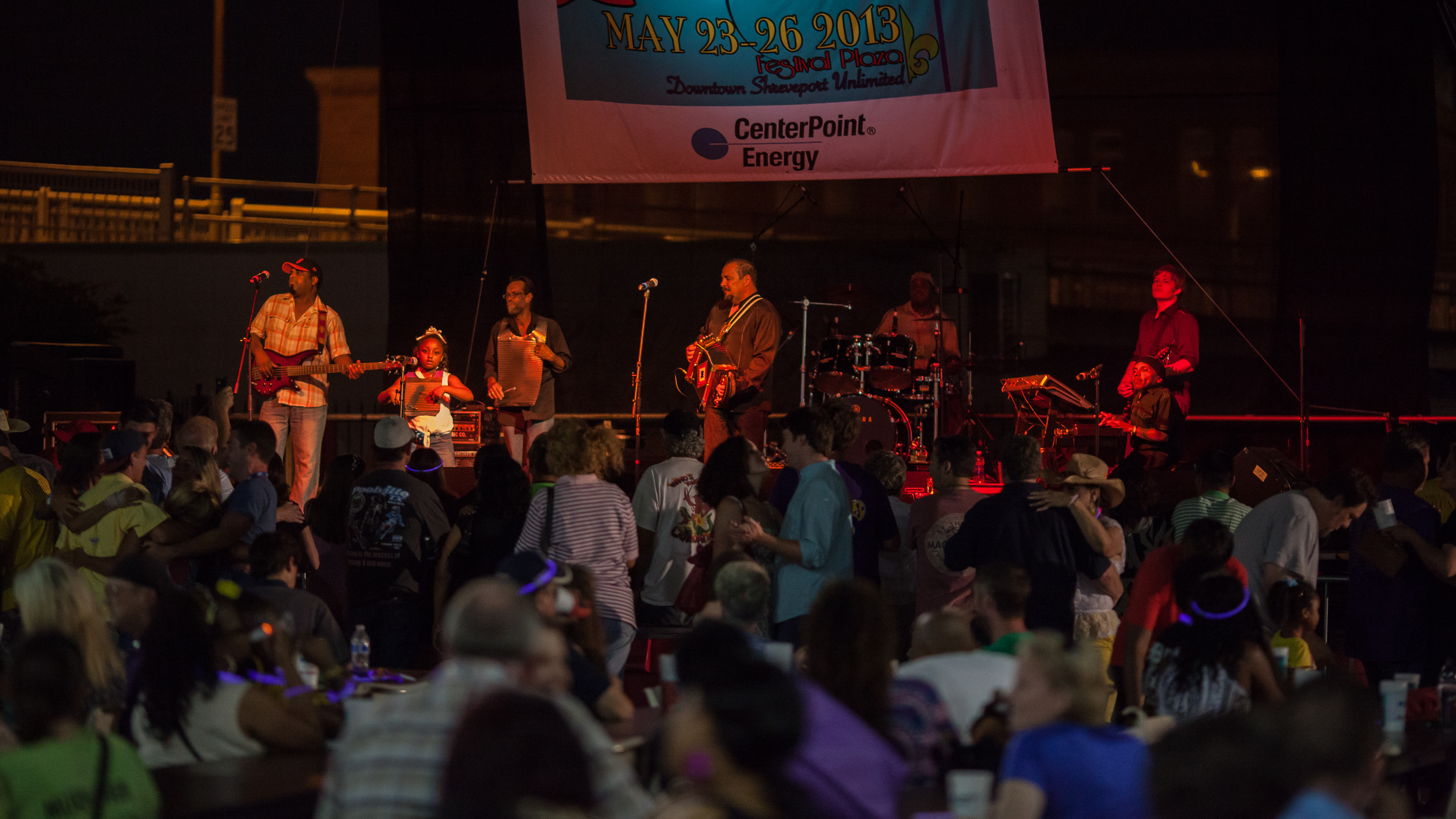
2014 winners Terrance Simien and the Zydeco Experience.

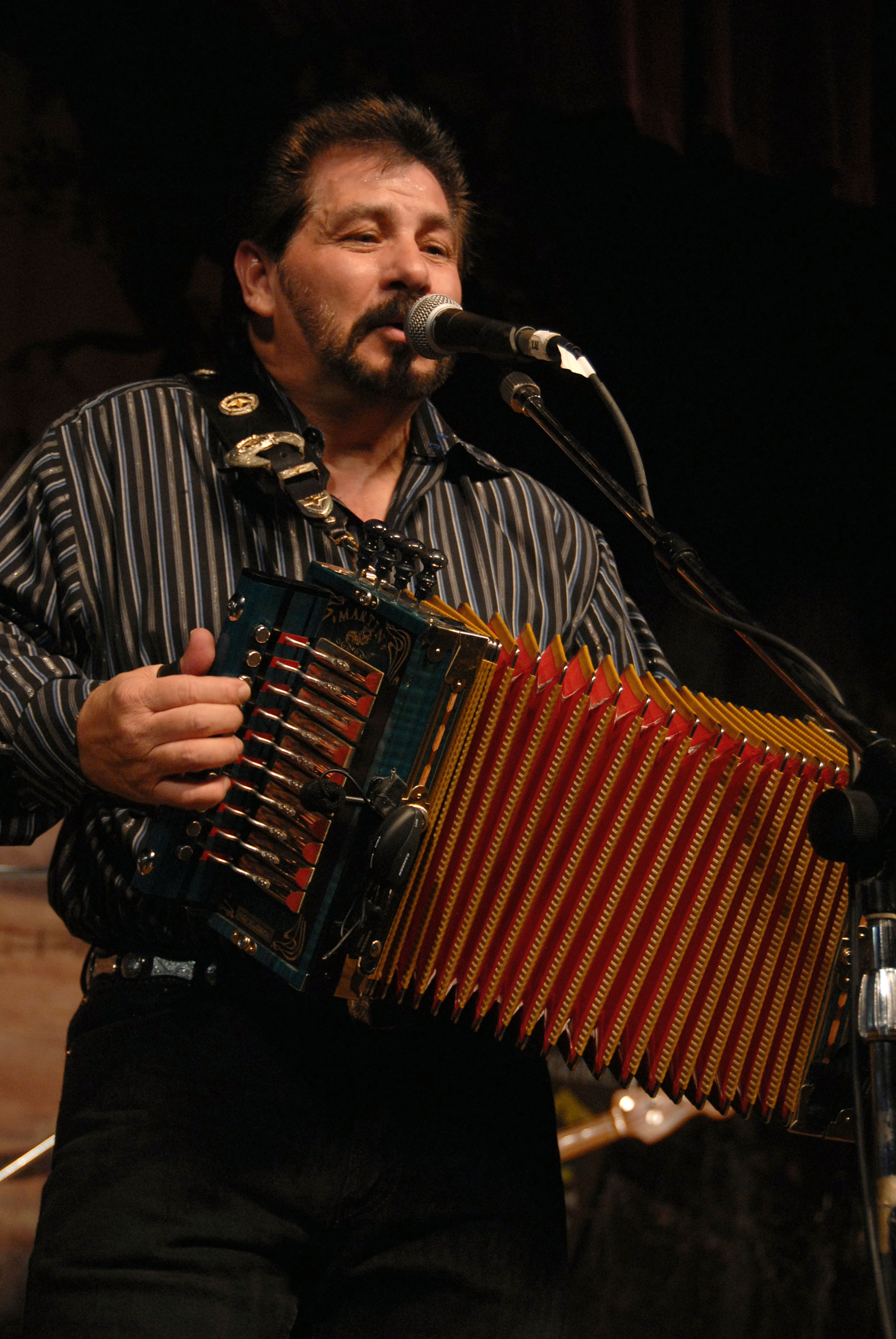
2015 winner Jo-El Sonnier.

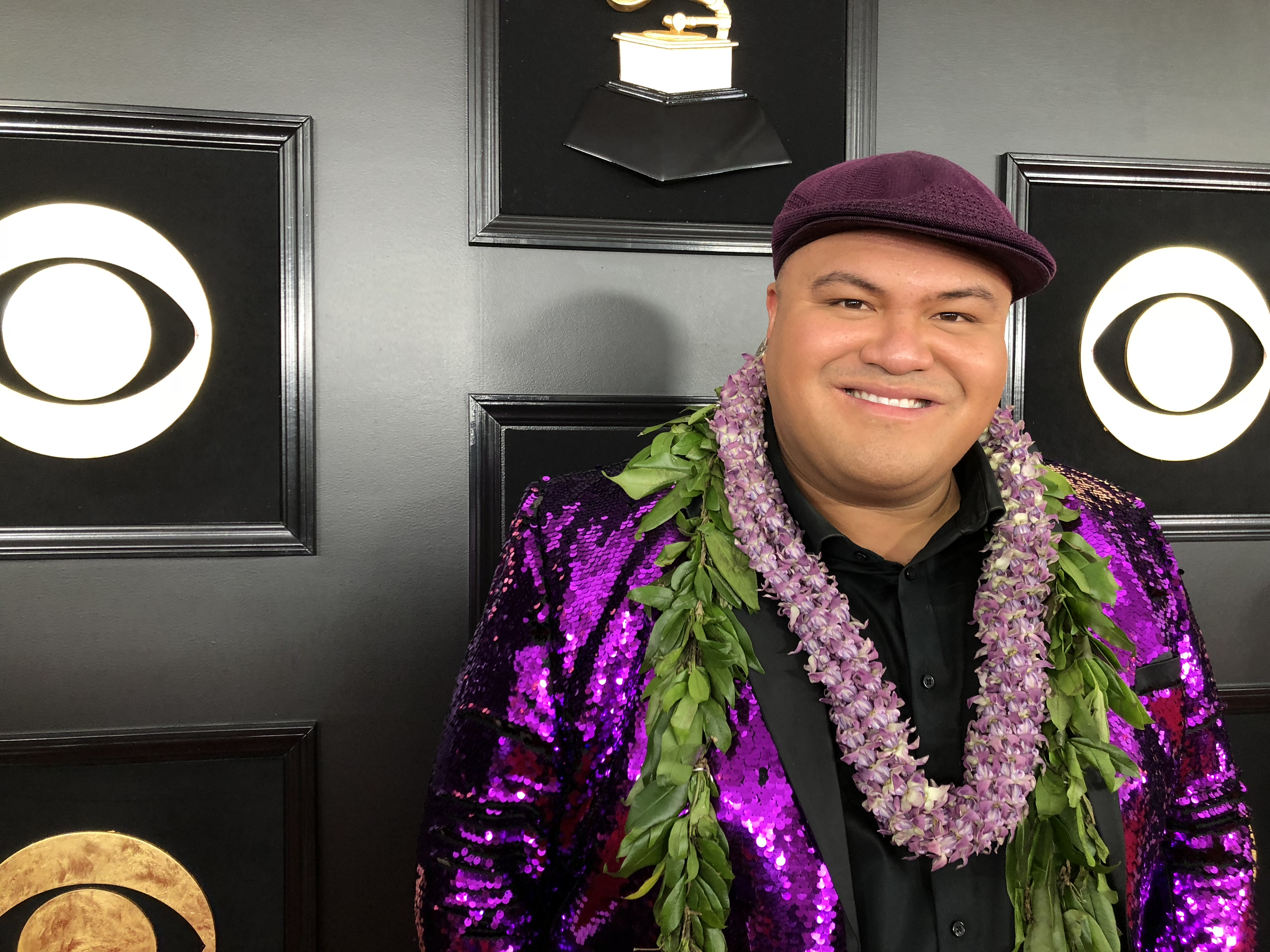
Four-time winner Kalani Pe'a.

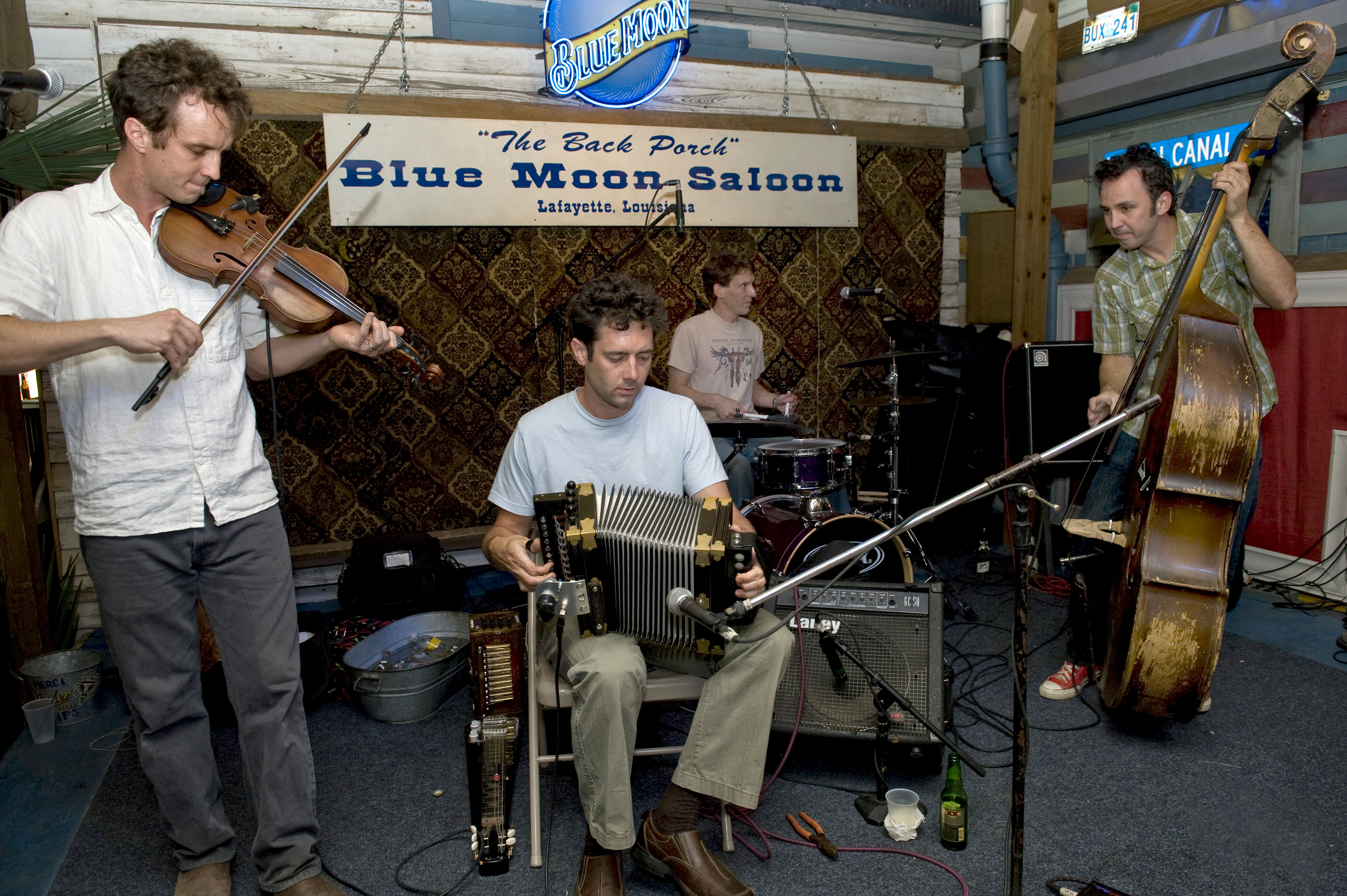
2018 winner The Lost Bayou Ramblers.

=== 2010s ===
Year	Work	Artist
2012
2012	Rebirth of New Orleans	Rebirth Brass Band
2012	Can't Sit Down	C.J. Chenier
2012	Grand Isle	Steve Riley and The Mamou Playboys
2012	Not Just Another Polka	Jimmy Sturr & His Orchestra
2012	Wao Akua — The Forest of the Gods	George Kahumoku Jr.
2013
2013	The Band Courtbouillon	Wayne Toups, Steve Riley and Wilson Savoy
2013	Malama Ko Aloha (Keep Your Love)	Keola Beamer
2013	Nothin' But the Best	Corey Ledet, Anthony Dopsie, Dwayne Dopsie and Andre Thierry
2013	Pilialoha	Weldon Kekauoha
2013	Shi Kéyah — Songs for the People	Radmilla Cody
2014
2014	Dockside Sessions	Terrance Simien and the Zydeco Experience
2014	Apache Blessing & Crown Dance Songs	Joe Tohonnie Jr.
2014	Hula Ku'i	Kahulanui
2014	Le Fou	Zachary Richard
2014	The Life & Times of... The Hot 8 Brass Band	Hot 8 Brass Band
2015
2015	The Legacy	Jo-El Sonnier
2015	Ceremony	Joe Tohonnie Jr.
2015	Hanu 'A'ala	Kamaka Kukona
2015	Light the Stars	Bonsoir Catin
2015	Love's Lies	Magnolia Sisters
2016
2016	Go Go Juice	Jon Cleary
2016	Generations	Windwalker and The MCW
2016	Get Ready	The Revelers
2016	Kawaiokalena	Keali'i Reichel
2016	La La La La	Natalie Ai Kamauu
2017
2017	E Walea	Kalani Pe'a
2017	Broken Promised Land	Barry Jean Ancelet & Sam Broussard
2017	Gulfstream	Roddie Romero & The Hub City All-Stars
2017	I Wanna Sing Right: Rediscovering Lomax in the Evangeline Country	Various Artists, Joshua Caffery and Joel Savoy, (producers)
2017	It's a Cree Thing	Northern Cree
2018
2018	Kalenda	The Lost Bayou Ramblers
2018	Hoʻokena 3.0	Hoʻokena
2018	Miyo Kekisepa, Make a Stand (Live)	Northern Cree
2018	Pua Kiele	Josh Tatofi
2018	Top of the Mountain	Dwayne Dopsie and the Zydeco Hellraisers
2019
2019	No 'Ane'i	Kalani Pe'a
2019	Aloha From Na Hoa	Na Hoa
2019	Kreole Rock and Soul	Sean Ardoin
2019	Mewasinsational — Cree Round Dance Songs	Young Spirit
2019	Spyboy	Cha Wa

=== 2020s ===
Year	Work	Artist
2020
2020	Good Time	Ranky Tanky
2020	Hawaiian Lullaby	Various Artists, Imua Garza and Kimié Miner (producers)
2020	Kalawai'anui	Amy Hānaiali'i
2020	Recorded Live at the 2019 New Orleans Jazz & Heritage Festival	Rebirth Brass Band
2020	When It's Cold — Cree Round Dance Songs	Northern Cree
2021
2021	Atmosphere	New Orleans Nightcrawlers
2021	Cameron Dupuy & the Cajun Troubadours	Cameron Dupuy & the Cajun Troubadours
2021	Lovely Sunrise	Nā Wai ʽEhā
2021	My Relatives "Nikso Kowaiks"	Black Lodge Singers
2021	A Tribute to Al Berard	Sweet Cecilia
2022
2022	Kau Ka Pe'a	Kalani Pe'a
2022	Bloodstains & Teardrops	Big Chief Monk Boudreaux
2022	Corey Ledet Zydeco	Corey Ledet Zydeco
2022	Live in New Orleans!	Sean Ardoin & Kreole Rock and Soul
2022	My People	Cha Wa
2023
2023	Live at the 2022 New Orleans Jazz & Heritage Festival	Ranky Tanky
2023	Full Circle	Sean Ardoin & Kreole Rock and Soul featuring LSU Golden Band from Tigerland
2023	Halau Hula Keali'i O Nalani — Live at the Getty Center	Halau Hula Keali'i O Nalani
2023	Lucky Man	Nathan & the Zydeco Cha Chas
2023	Natalie Noelani	Natalie Ai Kamauu
2024
2024	Live: Orpheum Theater Nola	The Lost Bayou Ramblers and Louisiana Philharmonic Orchestra
2024	New Beginnings	Buckwheat Zydeco Jr. & The Legendary Ils Sont Partis Band
2024	Live at the 2023 New Orleans Jazz & Heritage Festival	Dwayne Dopsie & the Zydeco Hellraisers
2024	Live at the Maple Leaf	The Rumble featuring Chief Joseph Boudreaux Jr.
2024	Made in New Orleans	New Breed Brass Band
2024	Too Much to Hold	New Orleans Nightcrawlers
2025
2025	Kuini	Kalani Pe'a
2025	Live at the 2024 New Orleans Jazz & Heritage Festival	Big Chief Monk Boudreaux & The Golden Eagles featuring J'Wan Boudreaux
2025	Live at the 2024 New Orleans Jazz & Heritage Festival	New Breed Brass Band featuring Trombone Shorty
2025	Stories from The Battlefield	The Rumble featuring Chief Joseph Boudreaux Jr.
2025	25 Back to My Roots	Sean Ardoin and Kreole Rock And Soul
2026
2026	A Tribute to the King of Zydeco	Various Artists
2026	Church of New Orleans	Kyle Roussel
2026	For Fat Man	Preservation Brass and Preservation Hall Jazz Band
2026	Live at Vaughan's	Corey Henry & The Treme Funktet
2026	Second Line Sunday	Trombone Shorty and the New Breed Brass Band
2027
2027	Ain't No Dying	The Rumble featuring Chief Joseph Boudreaux Jr.
2027	Live at Tipitina's 2025	Dumpstaphunk
2027	Louisiana Love	Robin Barnes
2027	This Village	Ranky Tanky
2027	Tongva Songs We Are Here Ekwa Chem	Tongva Ensemble featuring Connor Chee and Geneviève Gros-Louis

^{^[I]} Each year is linked to the article about the Grammy Awards held that year.
