= Dwayne Dopsie =

American Zydeco musician

- Dwayne Dopsie in 2026

Background information
- Born: Dwayne Rubin; March 3, 1979 (age 47); Lafayette, Louisiana, U.S.
- Genres: zydeco
- Instruments: accordion, vocals
- Website: dwaynedopsie.com

Dwayne Rubin, better known by his stage name Dwayne Dopsie, is an American Zydeco musician. He is the accordionist and vocalist for his New Orleans-based band, Dwayne Dopsie and the Zydeco Hellraisers.

== Biography ==
Dwayne Dopsie was born March 3, 1979, in Lafayette, Louisiana. He is the youngest of accordionist Rockin' Dopsie's eight children, and picked up music in the household from an early age. He began playing washboard at age six and accordion at seven, and performed with his father on stage at Mardi Gras and on television for a Super Bowl halftime during his childhood.

After Rockin' Dopsie died in 1993, Dwayne Dopsie dropped out of high school to pursue zydeco music full-time. He founded his own band, the Zydeco Hellraisers, in 1999 when he was nineteen years old, and that same year was named "America's Hottest Accordionist" in a competition run by the American Accordion Association.

In 2013, Dopsie collaborated with Corey Ledet, Anthony Dopsie and Andre Thierry on the album Nothin' But the Best, which was nominated for a Grammy Award for Best Regional Roots Music Album. Dopsie received another nomination in the same category for his 2017 album Top of the Mountain. Dopsie plays regularly at New Orleans events such as Mardi Gras and Jazz & Heritage Festival, has done numerous tours of the United States, and has toured internationally several times, including performances in Canada, Georgia, and China. In 2018, Dopsie signed with Louisiana Red Hot Records, who released Bon Ton in the June, 2019.

Dwayne Dopsie and the Zydeco Hellraisers at the 2026 Minnesota State Fair

== Music ==
Dopsie's style is grounded in Zydeco but incorporates musical elements from rock and roll, rhythm and blues, blues, and reggae.

== Zydeco Hellraisers members ==
Current

- Dwayne Dopsie - accordion, vocal
- Juju Child - guitar
- Brandon David - guitar, vocals
- Percy Walker - drums
- Dion Pierre - bass
- Paul Lafleur - washboard
- Tim McFatter - saxophone

Former

- Alex MacDonald - washboard, vocals
- Calvin Sam - drums
- Carl Landry - saxophone
- Shelton Sonnier - guitar, vocals
- Vincent Doucet - washboard
- Kipori Woods - guitar
- Dee Fleming - drums
- Kevin Minor - drums
- Reggie Smith Jr. - saxophone

== Awards and honors ==
=== OffBeat's Best of The Beat Awards ===
Year	Category	Work nominated	Result	Ref.
1999	Best Emerging Zydeco Band or Performer		Won	
2000	Best Emerging Zydeco Band or Performer		Won	
2003	Best Accordionist		Won	
2012	Best Zydeco Band or Performer		Won	
2012	Best Zydeco Album	Been Good to You	Won	
2013	Best Accordionist		Won	
2014	Best Zydeco Band or Performer		Won	
2015	Best Zydeco Band or Performer		Won	
2015	Best Zydeco Album	Calling Your Name	Won	
2016	Best Zydeco Band or Performer		Won	
2017	Best Zydeco Band or Performer		Won	
2017	Best Zydeco Album	Top of the Mountain	Won	
2017	Best Accordionist		Won	
2018	Best Zydeco Band or Performer		Won	
2019	Best Zydeco Band or Performer		Won	
2019	Best Zydeco Album	Bon Ton	Won	
2020	Best Zydeco Band or Performer		Won	
2021-22	Best Zydeco Band or Performer		Won	
2021-22	Best Zydeco Album	Set Me Free	Won	
2023	Best Accordionist		Won	

== Discography ==
Studio albums

- Now It Begins (1999)
- Dopsie Strikes (2001)
- Travelin' Man (2006)
- Up In Flames (2009)
- Been Good To You (2011)
- Calling Your Name (2015)
- Top Of The Mountain (2017, Grammy Nominated)
- Bon Ton (2019)
- Set me free ( 2021)

Live albums

- Get Down! (2011)
- Dopsie's Got It (2014)
- LIVE AT THE 2023 NEW ORLEANS JAZZ & HERITAGE FESTIVAL ( 2023, Grammy nominated)
