= Matuto =

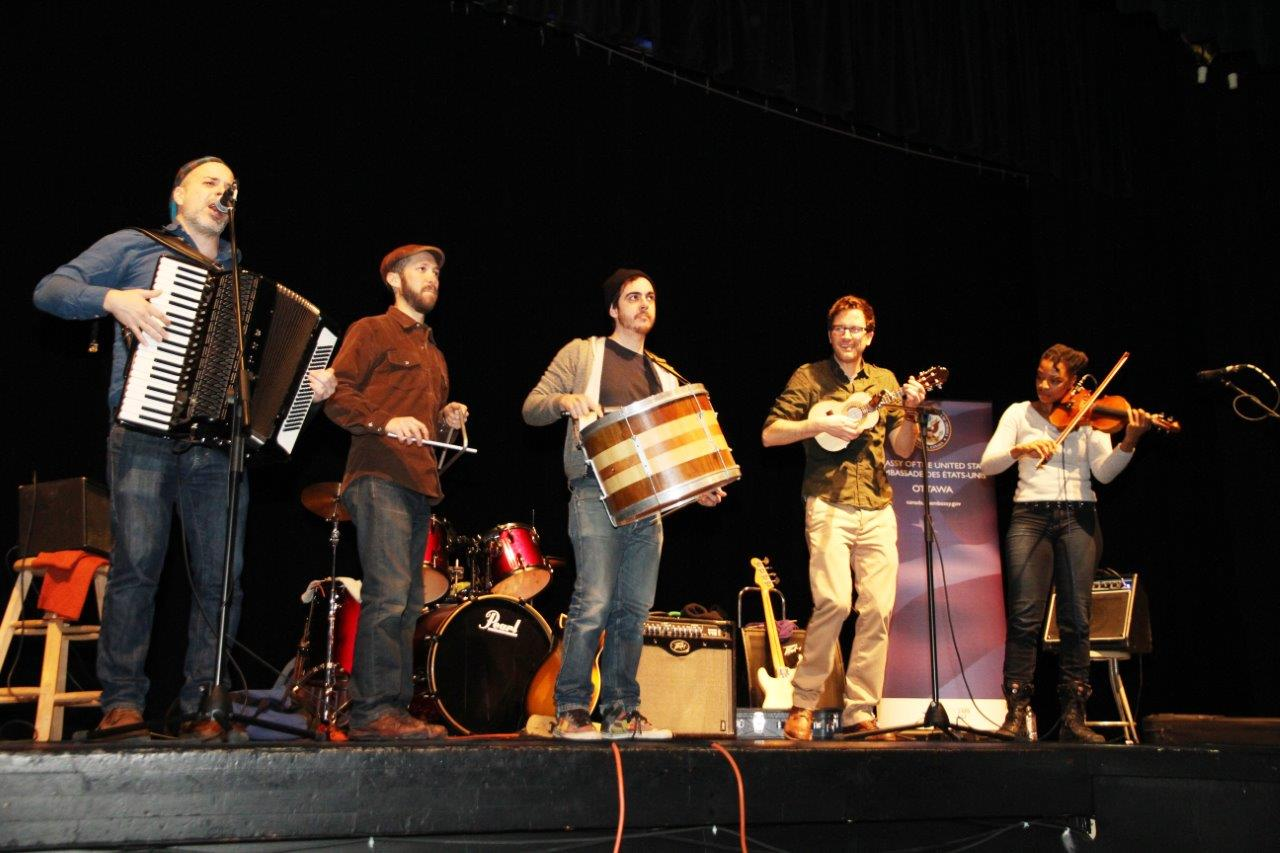
- Matuto performing in Ottawa in 2014

Background information
- Origin: New York City
- Genres: Blues, Brazilian, Americana, Bluegrass
- Labels: Motema Music; Galileo MC; Ropeadope Records
- Members: Clay Ross; Rob Curto; Zé Maurício; Richie Barshay; Mike Lavalle; Mazz Swift
- Website: www.matutomusic.com

Matuto is a blues-band based in New York City. They are an international touring band. They are signed with Ropeadope Records.

The term matuto (Brazilian Portuguese pronunciation: [mɐˈtu.tu]) is a Brazilian slang word for "country bumpkin."

== History ==
Clay Ross and Rob Curto officially started the band on February 28, 2009, when they played the massive REC BEAT festival on the Sunday of Brazilian Carnival in Recife. They have since performed internationally at venues and festivals including Chicago World Music Festival, Madison World Music Festival, Expressions of Brazil Festival, Ingenuity Fest Cleveland, LEAF Festival, The Philadelphia Folk Festival, The Grassroots Festival, The Kennedy Center, Summer Dance Chicago, The Krannert Center, REC BEAT Festival, Garanhuns Jazz Festival, The Blue Note Jazz Club, Musikfest, and many more.

The members of Matuto have worked with Herbie Hancock, Chick Corea, Esperanza Spalding, Cyro Baptista, Tony Trischka, Steve Martin, Bela Fleck, Phoebe Snow, Southside Johnny and the Asbury Jukes, Cyndi Lauper, Cassandra Wilson, Abigail Washburn, "Dizzy" Daniel Moorehead, The Wild Colonials, Lila Downs, Yo Yo Ma, Lee Konitz, The Klezmatics, Fred Hersch, Kenny Werner, Natalie Merchant, David Krakauer, Pete Seeger.

== Awards ==
- 2009 - Fulbright Grant - Recife, Brazil
- 2011 - Selected as Official Showcasing Artists for Womex
- 2012 - Selected as American Musical Ambassadors for the U.S. State Department

== Albums ==
- Matuto - Released on November 18, 2011, on Galileo MC
- The Devil and the Diamond - Released on May 14, 2013, on Motema Music
