= Opihi Pickers =

Hawaiian island reggae band

- Origin: Honolulu, Hawaii, United States
- Genres: Hawaiian, Adult Contemporary
- Years active: 1993–2008
- Label: GO Aloha Entertainment
- Past members: Imua Garza; Hoku Garza; Kahale Morales; Kevin Okimoto

The Opihi Pickers was an island reggae group from Hawaii that blend island, reggae, and contemporary music.

The group is composed of vocalist and ukulele player Imua Garza, Imua's brother Hoku Garza (guitar and ukulele), their cousins Kahale Morales (bass) and Kevin Okimoto (guitar and vocals).

The Opihi Pickers began as recording artists in 1998 while still young teens. They broke through to a wider audience in 2001 with the success of their hit song "Old Fashioned Touch".

In early 2008 they announced that the band would be disbanding in June 2008.

== Discography ==
- 1998: Fresh Off The Rocks
- 2001: Beginnings
- 2003: All For You
- 2004: Together As One
- 2006: An Old Fashioned Christmas
- 2007: OP VI
- 2008: Greatest Picks - Best of the Opihi Pickers

== See also ==
- Hawaiian music
- Opihi
