= Hoʻokena (group) =

Ho'okena
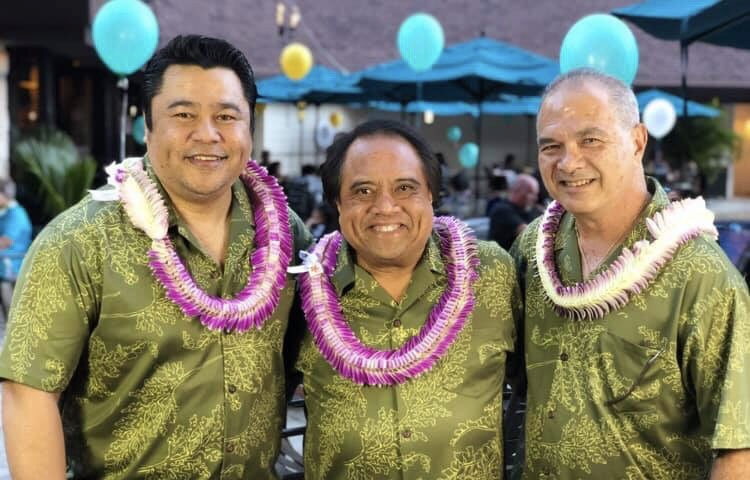

Background information
- Genre: Hawaiian
- Instruments: Guitar, ukulele, bass
- Years active: 1986-Present
- Website: hookenamusic.com

Ho'okena is a Hawaiian music trio which consist of the members Horace K. Dudoit, Chris Kamaka and Glen Smith. The group was created in 1986 and remains one of the longest lasting Hawaiian music groups. Ho'okena has been nominated for the Grammy Awards three times and has won multiple Na Hoku Hanohano Awards.

== Music career ==
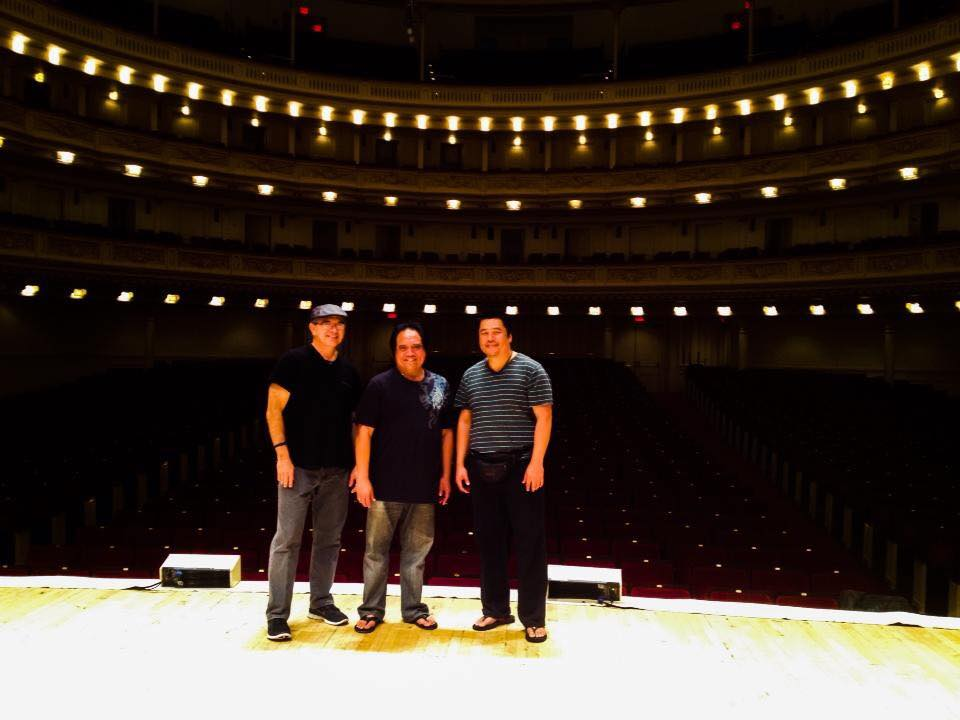
Ho'okena Carnegie Hall 2013

Ho'okena has performed at the world renowned Carnegie Hall twice. Ho'okena has released twelve music albums. In 2008 the group had the opportunity to perform for then-President of the United States Barack Obama and then-First Lady Michelle Obama along with Hawaiian Musicians Raiatea Helm and Willie K. In 2015 Ho'okena recorded a song with country superstar Josh Turner on his album Deep South (Josh Turner album) titled "Hawaiian Girl." In 2018 Horace K. Dudoit and Glen Smith performed at the Merrie Monarch Festival for Kumu Hula Robert Cazimero of The Brothers Cazimero. Cazimero promised to showcase a group of "A+ musicians."

In 2018, Ho'okena and Moon Kauakahi, who was formerly in the band Mākaha Sons, was featured on Kalani Pe'a's sophomore album. Pe'a's album "No 'Ane'i" went on to win a Grammy Award in 2019 under the Best Regional Roots Music Album category.

== Discography ==
=== Albums ===
- 2020: Meant To Be
- 2017: Ho‘okena 3.0
- 2012: Huliau
- 2009: Nani Mau Loa - Everlasting Beauty
- 2005: Treasure II: Lei Pūlamahia
- 2003: Cool Elevation
- 2001: Treasure
- 2000: Home for the Holidays
- 1999: Ho'okena 5
- 1996: Ho‘okamaha‘o
- 1993: Nā Kai Ewalu
- 1991: Choice of the Heart
- 1990: Thirst Quencher!

== Music awards ==
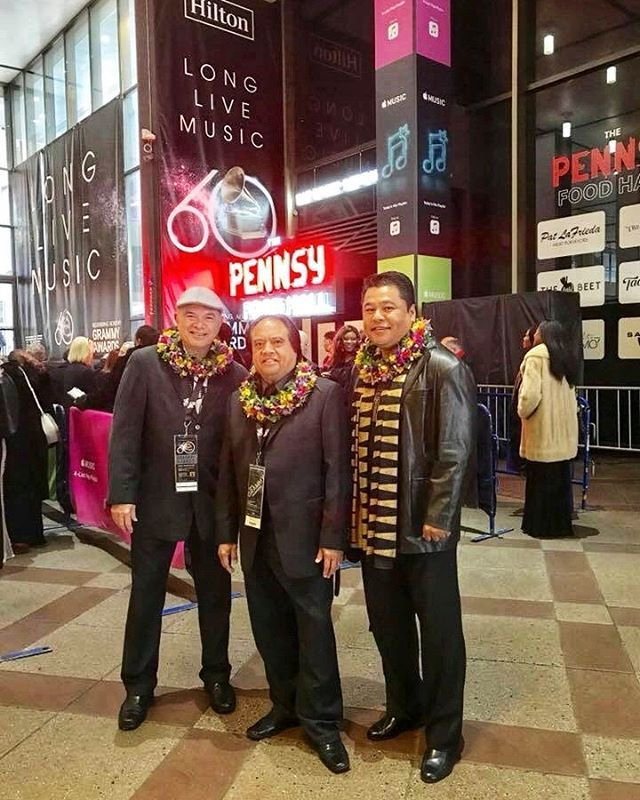
Ho'okena at the 60th Annual Grammy Awards New York City 2018

=== Nā Hōkū Hanohano Awards ===
Ho'okena has won seven Na Hoku Hanohano Awards.

- 1991: Thirst Quencher! - Most Promising Artist
- 1991: Thirst Quencher! - Group Of The Year
- 1991: Thirst Quencher! - Traditional Hawaiian Album Of The Year
- 2000: Ho‘okena 5 - Hawaiian Language Performance
- 2001: Home for the Holidays - Christmas Album Of The Year
- 2010: Nani Mau Loa - Everlasting Beauty - Hawaiian Language Performance
- 2010: Nani Mau Loa - Everlasting Beauty - Group Of The Year

=== Grammy Awards ===
Ho'okena has been nominated for a Grammy Award three times.

- 2004: Cool Elevation - Best Hawaiian Music Album (Nominee)
- 2009: Nani Mau Loa: Everlasting Beauty - Best Hawaiian Music Album (Nominee)
- 2018: Ho'okena 3.0 - Best Regional Roots Music Album (Nominee)
