= Kimié =

American singer-songwriter

Kimié Miner
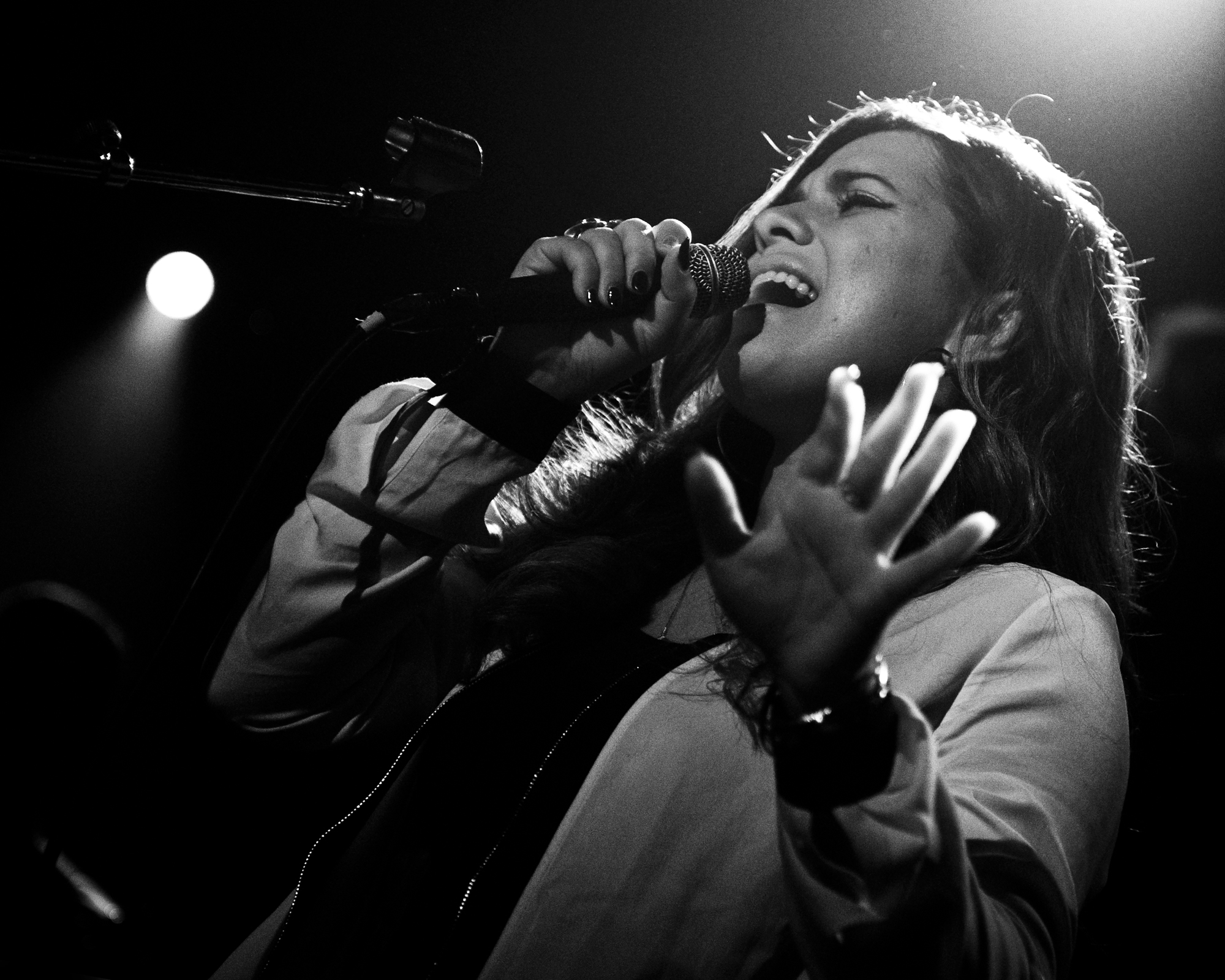

Background information
- Born: Kimie Kauikeolani Miner; July 3, 1985 (age 41); Kailua, Hawaii County, Hawaii, U.S.
- Genres: Folk, reggae
- Occupations: Singer-songwriter, musician
- Instruments: Guitar, ukulele
- Website: kimieminer.com

Kimié Kauikeolani Miner better known as Kimié, is an American singer-songwriter and musician of Native Hawaiian and Portuguese descent. In November 2019 Miner earned her first Grammy Award nomination for the compilation album titled "Hawaiian Lullaby" as a producer along with producer Imua Garza. It was released in 2019 under her label Haku Collective. Hawaiian Lullaby was nominated in the 62nd Annual Grammy Awards under the Best Regional Roots Music Album category. Miner is an independent artist formerly managed by Kimo Kennedy of Arium Music and Kekoa Kapua of FR Management.

== Early life and education ==
Kimié grew up in both Kailua-Kona and Honolulu. At age 14, she began writing songs and taught herself how to play the guitar. Kimié graduated from Kamehameha Schools in 2003 and went on to attend the University of San Diego before transferring back to the University of Hawaii at Manoa.

== Career ==
In 2004 while attending the University of San Diego, Kimié sang for reggae legend Barrington Levy, who was so impressed that he recruited her as an opening act for part of his west coast tour. Kimié went on to release her debut studio album Distant Traveler on December 8, 2009, with Dreality Records. She starred in the "Hungry Girl" version of the Burger King commercial, which first aired July 30, 2012, singing Sean Naʻauao's famous "Fish and Poi" with a twist. A Kickstarter campaign was launched to fund her EP To the Sea in late 2012. She surpassed her goal to produce the EP independently, releasing To the Sea on March 5, 2013. The radio hit "Make Me Say" featuring Kimié's long-time friend and Hawaii musician Imua Garza was the EP's top-rated song and was No. 1 on radio station KCCN-FM’s Top 40 Songs of 2013.

On April 1, 2014 Kimié released a mock music video for her new single "New Day" in collaboration with First Insurance Company's ad campaign "In Paradise, Bad Still Happens" before releasing the official video on April 15. She released a self-titled project Kimié Miner in 2015, her second full-length album. In 2017, Kimié released her third album Proud as the Sun that featured two hit singles "Bamboo" and "Sea of Love".

Kimié has won multiple awards for her music including Na Hoku Hanohano Awards for 2016 Contemporary Album of the Year with self-titled project Kimié Miner, 2018 Song of the Year for "Bamboo" and 2018 Female Vocalist of the Year for Proud as the Sun. She has collaborated and toured with acts such as Anuhea, Irie Love, Eli-Mac, Tenelle, Imua Garza, The Green, and Kolohe Kai.

In 2019 Kimie traveled to Los Angeles to teach a music education workshop class for the youth at the Grammy Museum at L.A. Live. Kimie taught the class along with Hawaii Musician Bobby Moderow.

== Personal life ==
Kimié has one daughter, born in March 2018. She is close friends with fellow Hawaiian singer and former Kamehameha classmate Anuhea Jenkins. Kimié also runs her own company called Haku Collective, a music and talent production group that focuses on the creative output of emerging Hawaiian artists.

== Discography ==
=== Albums ===
- Distant Traveler (2009)
- Kimié Miner (2015)
- Proud as the Sun (2017)

=== Extended Plays ===
- To the Sea (2013)

=== Production ===
- Hawaiian Lullaby (2019) (by the Haku Collective)

== Music awards ==
=== Nā Hōkū Hanohano Awards ===
The Na Hoku Hanohano Awards are the premier music awards in Hawaii and are Hawaii's equivalent to the Grammy Awards. The awards are presented to the musicians exemplifying the best work in their class.

- 2016: Kimie Miner - Contemporary Album Of The Year
- 2018: Kimie Miner - Female Vocalist Of The Year
- 2018: Bamboo - Song Of The Year

=== Nā Hōkū Hanohano Awards - Technical & Adjudicated Awards ===
- 2018: Proud As The Sun - General Engineering Award (Imua Garza and Jules Washington)
