= Monk Boudreaux =

American singer and musician

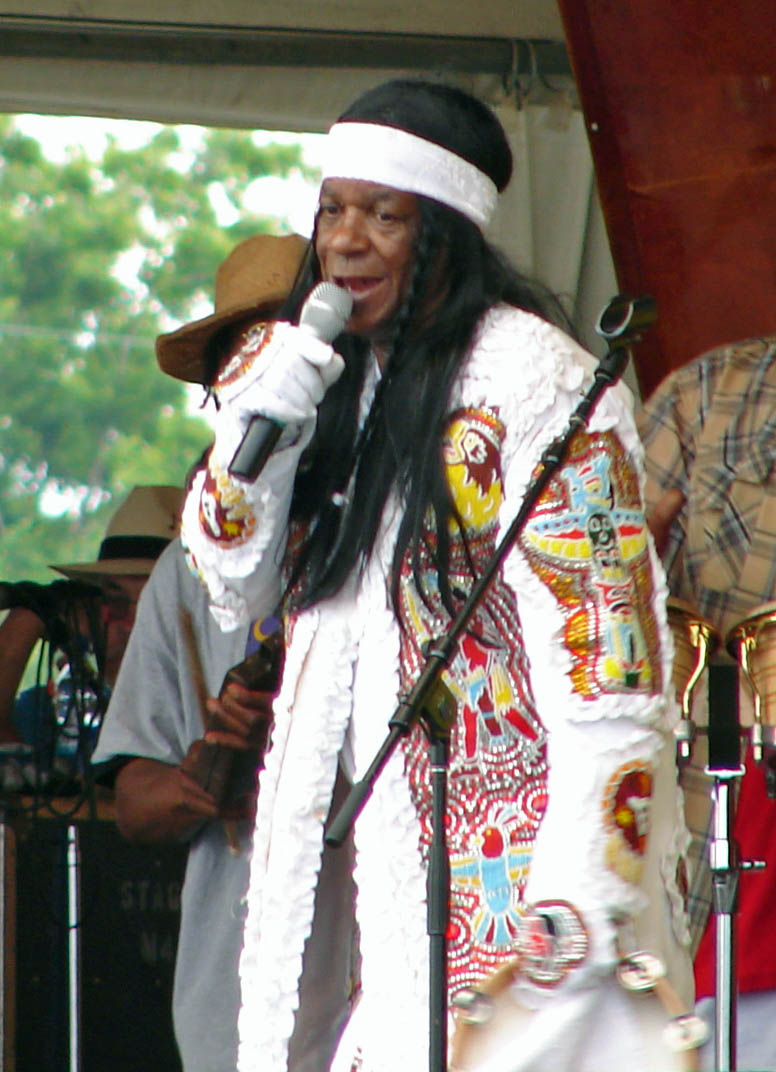
- Boudreaux at the New Orleans Jazz Fest, 2006

Background information
- Also known as: Big Chief Monk Boudreaux; Monk
- Born: Joseph Pierre Boudreaux; December 7, 1941 (age 84); New Orleans, Louisiana, U.S.
- Genres: New Orleans music, Mardi Gras Indian
- Instruments: Vocals, percussion
- Years active: 1960s–present
- Labels: Rounder, Shanachie

"Big Chief" Monk Boudreaux (born Joseph Pierre Boudreaux; December 7, 1941) is an African-American musician and Big Chief of the Golden Eagles, a Mardi Gras Indian tribe. He is widely known for his long-time collaboration with Big Chief Bo Dollis in The Wild Magnolias.

== Biography ==
In the late 1960s, Boudreaux joined the Wild Magnolias, the Mardi Gras Indian group led by his Big Chief Bo Dollis. Dollis and Boudreaux have been close friends since their childhood.

In 1970, Boudreaux appeared with the Wild Magnolias at the first New Orleans Jazz & Heritage Festival, and also in the same year, the group released the single "Handa Wanda" on Crescent City Records, the first studio recorded music by the Mardi Gras Indians. In 1974, he appeared with the Wild Magnolias on their debut album on Barclay/Polydor Records which featured Snooks Eaglin and Willie Tee in the supporting musicians. Boudreaux is exclusively featured on Golden Eagles' album Lightning and Thunder, a live recording released in 1988 on Rounder Records.

After being with the Wild Magnolias for over 30 years, Boudreaux left the group in 2001 as a result of disputes with the group's manager over guarantee payments. Since then he has performed and recorded with artists such as Anders Osborne, Galactic and Papa Mali aside from the Golden Eagles.

Boudreaux with the Golden Eagles appears in performance footage in the 2005 documentary film Make It Funky!, which presents a history of New Orleans music and its influence on rhythm and blues, rock and roll, funk and jazz. They perform the Mardi Gras Indian standard "Sew, Sew, Sew".

In the recent years, he has also participated in the recording and tour of the Voice of the Wetlands All-stars, a band that also featured Tab Benoit, Cyril Neville, and Dr. John among others. He is also featured on one track in the New Orleans Social Club's album Sing Me Back Home released in 2006. He currently performs regularly in New Orleans with John Lisi & Delta Funk, with whom he has also recorded.

== Personal life ==
Boudreaux's son, Chief Joseph Boudreaux Jr., is also a musician and was nominated in 2023 for the Grammy Award for Best Regional Roots Music Album. Monk was nominated for the same category in 2021.

== Legacy ==
In 2010, Boudreaux appeared in the feature-length documentary Bury the Hatchet directed by Aaron Walker. The film is an intimate look at the Mardi Gras Indian tradition, following Boudreaux and several other Mardi Gras Indian Chiefs in the year before Hurricane Katrina, through the storm and the years after. The documentary won best Louisiana feature at the New Orleans Film festival and a work-in-progress edit of the film won the Grand Prize and Intangible Culture Award at the Royal Anthropological Institute Festival of Ethnographic Film in Leeds, England.

Boudreaux and several of his family members were featured in a segment of the April 5, 2026 episode of 60 Minutes.

== Awards and honors ==
=== National Endowment for the Arts ===
He was a recipient of a 2016 National Heritage Fellowship awarded by the National Endowment for the Arts, which is the United States government's highest honor in the folk and traditional arts.

=== Grammy Awards ===
Year	Category	Work nominated	Result	Ref.
2022	Best Regional Roots Music Album	Bloodstains and Teardrops	Nominated	

=== OffBeat's Best of The Beat Awards ===
Year	Category	Work nominated	Result	Ref.
2002	Best Roots Rock Album	Bury the Hatchet (with Anders Osborne)	Won	
2002	Best Album Only in New Orleans	Bury the Hatchet (with Anders Osborne)	Won	
2003	Best Album Only in New Orleans	Mr. Stranger Man (with the Golden Eagles)	Won	
2017	Lifetime Achievement in Music		Won	

== Discography ==
=== Solo ===
- 1988 The Golden Eagles/Lightning & Thunder (Rounder)
- 2002 Bury the Hatchet (Shanachie) with Anders Osborne
- 2003 Mr. Stranger Man (Shanachie)
- 2009 Rising Sun (featuring Reverend Goat Carson) (f. Boo Music)
- 2011 Won't Bow Down (f. Boo Music)
- 2021 Bloodstains & Teardrops (Whiskey Bayou Records)

=== With the Wild Magnolias ===
- 1974 The Wild Magnolias (Barclay)
- 1975 They Call Us Wild (Barclay)
- 1990 I'm Back… at Carnival Time (Rounder)
- 1996 1313 Hoodoo Street (AIM)
- 1999 Life Is a Carnival (Metro Blue)
- 2002 30 Years .. And Still WILD! (spacing, punctuation, type case sic) (AIM)

=== Other ===
- 1992 The Mardi Gras Indians Super Sunday Showdown (Rounder)
- 2005 Voice of the Wetlands (Rykodisc)
- 2005 "Golden Crown" (vocals and wrote song) appeared on Tab Benoit's album Fever On The Bayou (Telarc)
- 2006 The New Orleans Social Club/Sing Me Back Home (Burgundy)
- 2007 Goin' Home: A Tribute to Fats Domino (Vanguard)
- 2012 Rough Guide to the Music of New Orleans (World Music Network)
