= Imua Garza =

American musician

Imua Garza is a Grammy Award nominated producer, vocalist, musician, recording engineer and composer. His first official professional music release was around the age of 11. He then went on to record and perform with the ukulele group Opihi Pickers.

Imua Garza's interest in music began at the young age of nine when he began playing the piano and taking music lessons. Soon he was playing several instruments including the 'ukulele, guitar, violin, and the electric bass. Early in his career, he placed second in the local music competition Keiki Stars and was voted one of seven acts considered "Producers Best". Imua first appeared on a professionally released compact disc at eleven when his version of "On Fire" was included on the Hidden Treasures - Ukulele Stylings 2 CD released in 1996 featuring Hawaii's most promising ukulele players.

At about this time Imua began playing in his first music group, Opihi Pickers, with his brother and cousin. The Opihi Pickers' first CD, Fresh Off the Rocks, was released in 1998. From these recordings and early live performances his reputation as a ukulele virtuoso soon grew around the islands. Since then, Imua has become an accomplished producer, recording studio engineer and musical arranger appearing on over a dozen CD's including four from the Opihi Pickers, several various artist projects and a solo instrumental project featuring the ukulele called Dreamspeaking, released in 2003. Touring throughout Hawai`i and Japan, he has also done work on a movie soundtrack and for commercials for radio and television.

In 2019 Garza was nominated for his first Grammy Award for a record titled "Hawaiian Lullaby" released by Haku Records in the Best Regional Roots Music Album category at the 62nd Annual Grammy Awards. Garza has worked with many musical artists including Grammy winner Kalani Pe'a, Jack Johnson (musician), Jake Shimabukuro, Katchafire, Kimie and many others.
