= Andre Thierry =

American Zydeco musician (born 1979)

- Born: July 9, 1979 (age 47); Richmond, California, United States
- Genres: Accordion Soul, Zydeco, Blues
- Instruments: Accordion, singer, bass guitar, rhythm guitar, and drums
- Years active: 1990s–present
- Website: andrethierry.com

Andre Thierry is an American Zydeco musician. He leads the band Andre Thierry Accordion Soul Music.

Andre was born in Richmond, California, on July 9, 1979, to Olivia "Tee" Guillory, originally from Basile, Louisiana, and Gregory Thierry, originally from Jennings, Louisiana. Andre Thierry's childhood was deeply influenced by his maternal grandparents, the late Houston Pete Pitre (Pa-Pa as they called him) from Basile, Louisiana, and his grandmother, known by many as Mama Lena Pitre, from Soileau, Louisiana.

In America, great migrations produce great music. Just as Delta musicians took Highway 61 to Chicago and electrified their blues, so did the Creoles and Cajuns migrate to California and establish vital dance communities. Now the California scenes rival anything back home in Louisiana, and that's due to players like Andre Thierry, a standard bearer for the new generation. Thierry is among the best of both the West Coast and the Gulf Coast, and he combines youthful vigor with a mature appreciation for his inherited tradition.

Thierry grew up experiencing the French Creole (La-La) dances his grandparents held at their church parish, St. Mark's Catholic Church. The best Zydeco musicians Louisiana had to offer traveled to California to play at the dances and spent considerable time at the Pitres' house while in the area. On one such visit, the "King of Zydeco," Clifton Chenier, grabbed three-year-old Andre by the arms and deemed him a future accordion player. From then on, Andre's father encouraged the young Andre to play the accordion.

Captivated by Chenier, Thierry began teaching himself to play by listening to Clifton's music. Andre demonstrated an innate musical ability, and his skill quickly grew. Andre played his first song, Willis Prudhomme's version of "Give’m Cornbread," in the backyard of his grandparents' home. He soon began playing Chenier's music on stages all over Northern California.

His grandparents continued to host Louisiana musicians, and this exposure to his heritage allowed him to develop his love for and mastery of traditional French Creole music. By age twelve, with the help of his mother, Thierry formed his own band, "Zydeco Magic". Andre's repertoire grew as he was regularly invited to play with numerous visiting bands, such as the late John Delafose, his son, Geno Delafose, and many local Zydeco and Cajun bands, including the late Danny Poullard (California Cajun Orchestra).

Thierry is a virtuoso on the accordion. Although Andre's instrument of choice is the accordion he also displays talent on bass guitar, rhythm guitar and drums. He sings traditional songs in original Creole French and his voice has been characterized as rich and soulful.

== Selected discography ==
- Bouncin with the Blues (2015 Andre Thierry)
- (Creole United) Non Jamais Fait (2013 Andre Thierry)
- Are You Ready To Learn (2012 Andre Thierry)
- Andre Thierry Live! At The Woodshop (2008 Lucky Cat Records)
- Christmas With Andre Thierry (2008 Andre Thierry)
- A Whole Lotta Something (2004 La Louisianne Records)
- It's About Time! (1999 Andre Thierry)
