= KB8 =

KB8 may stand for:

- Kobe Bryant (1978–2020), former professional basketball player
- Kidz Bop 8, an album by Kidz Bop
