= Josh Panda =

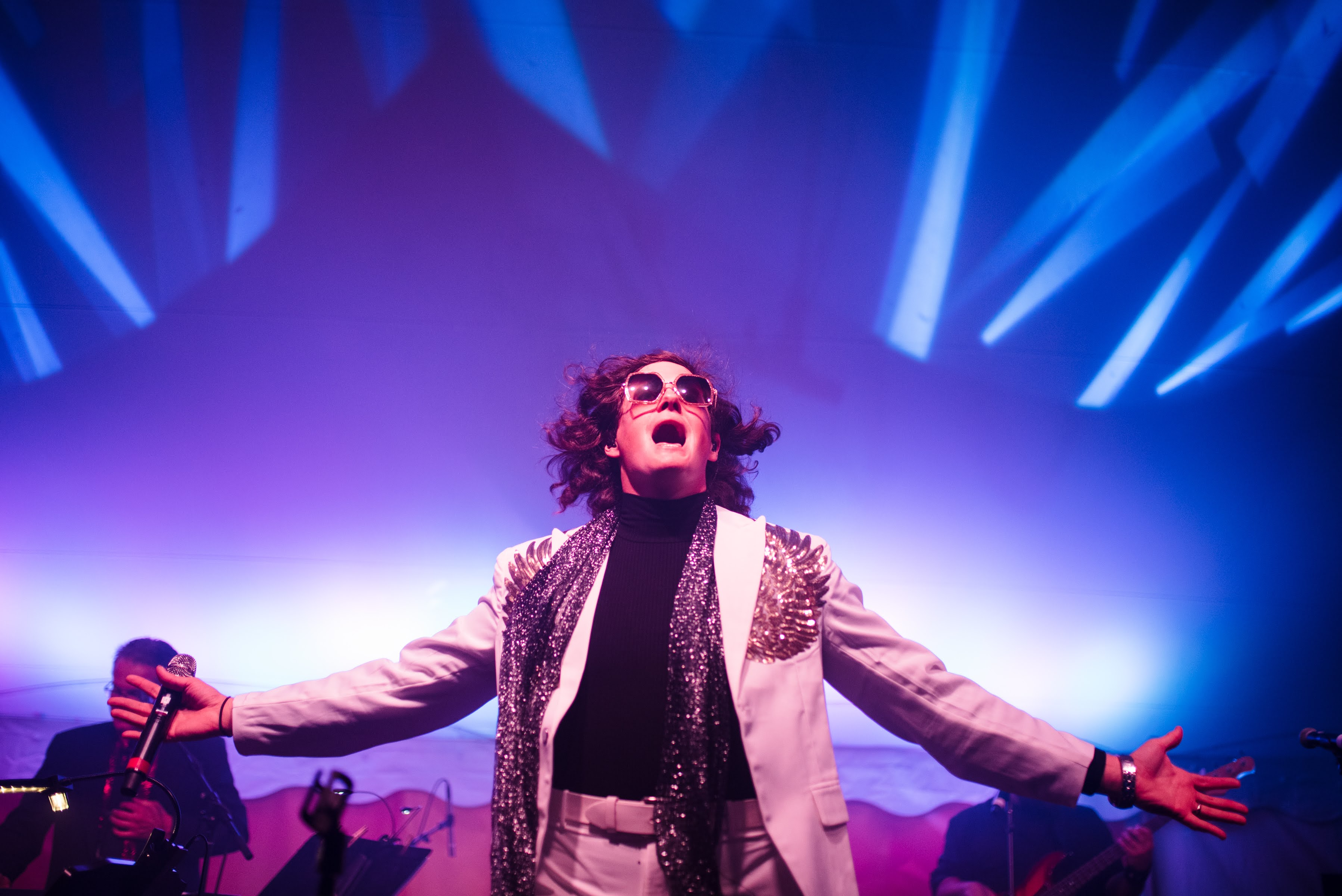
- Josh Panda performing live

Background information
- Born: Joshua David Pender; May 24, 1985 (age 41); Charlotte, North Carolina, U.S.
- Origin: Burlington, Vermont, U.S.
- Genres: Soul; Gospel; Rock; Americana; Blues; Pop; Funk
- Occupations: Singer; Songwriter; Musician
- Years active: 2007–present
- Website: joshpanda.com

Josh Panda (born Joshua David Pender, May 24, 1985) is an American singer and songwriter based in Burlington, Vermont, He has released three studio albums and one live album as a solo artist, and since 2020 has been a full member of Vermont band The Grift. In 2022, he represented Vermont on NBC's American Song Contest.

== Early life ==
Panda was born and raised in Charlotte, North Carolina. He grew up in Huntersville, NC, where he began singing gospel music at Rockwell Baptist Church at age three. His mother was the pianist and lead singer of a touring gospel trio she performed in with her sister and mother.

== Career ==
=== Move to Vermont (2007) ===
Panda first came to Burlington, Vermont around Christmas 2007, landing a Saturday night residency at Nectar's, the Burlington venue closely associated with Phish's early career. He chose to stay, later describing Vermont as feeling like home almost immediately, citing its strong sense of community.

=== What We Have Sewn (2009) ===
Performing under the name Joshua Panda, he released his debut album What We Have Sewn in 2009. Seven Days praised the record, calling his voice "stunning" and writing that "every note commands the listener's attention," while singling out the album's range from "ragtime piano and slide whistle" to "funk-soul scorcher."

=== Joshua Panda (2010) ===
His self-titled sophomore album was released in August 2010. Seven Days again reviewed it favorably, noting that Panda had "narrowed the gap between his dynamic vocal chops and compositional prowess" and describing the record as revealing "remarkable maturation."

=== Cowbell World Record (2012) ===
On April 14, 2012, Panda served as lead vocalist for the "World Record Breaking Event Band" on Church Street in Burlington, organized by Phish drummer Jon Fishman and sponsored by Ben & Jerry's to mark the 15th anniversary of their Phish Food ice cream flavor. Over 1,600 participants joined the ensemble, more than doubling the previous Guinness World Record for the largest cowbell ensemble of 640. Proceeds benefited Vermont flood relief through Phish's WaterWheel Foundation. The band performed songs including Blue Öyster Cult's "(Don't Fear) The Reaper."

The same year, Panda released Live in Switzerland, a live album documenting performances with his touring band.

=== Shake It Up (2017) ===
His third studio album, Shake It Up, released in 2017, was self-produced and featured over a dozen Vermont musicians including drummer Steve Hadeka, guitarist Lowell Thompson, and keyboardist Leon Campos. Seven Days called it "Panda's definitive work," noting a stylistic shift away from Americana toward a soulful sound with Southern rock influences, and describing it as "the perfect summer soundtrack for lazy evenings and country roads."

=== Joining The Grift (2020–present) ===
Panda first crossed paths with Vermont band The Grift at a 2011 show at Higher Ground in Burlington, after which he began guesting with the band, particularly at private events and weddings. During the COVID-19 pandemic, he saw an opportunity to join the band full-time. "I was burnt out from being a band leader and the sole creative in a band," Panda said. "And the idea of spending my time and sharing a stage with my best friends was too good to pass up."

Though Panda had been a member since approximately 2020, the band did not publicly announce the partnership until 2023. Adapting to a collaborative role after a career as a solo artist, Panda also took on new instrumental responsibilities, using a Roland GR-55 guitar synthesizer to fill keyboard parts vacated by a departing member. "For a guy who played acoustic guitar most of his career, it took some getting used to," he said.

To mark the announcement, The Grift released the single "Serious" in 2023, which Seven Days described as pushing "into funk and pop behind Panda's smooth, soulful vocals," calling the union "immediately intriguing" and "a strong statement of intent."

=== American Song Contest (2022) ===
In 2022, Panda was selected to represent Vermont on American Song Contest, NBC's competition series hosted by Kelly Clarkson and Snoop Dogg, inspired by the Eurovision Song Contest. The field included established artists such as Jewel, Macy Gray, Michael Bolton, and Sisqó. Panda performed his original song "Rollercoaster" during Week 5. He later told the Burlington Free Press that he initially mistook the invitation from NBC producers for spam email. His appearance drew coverage from Seven Days, NBC5 Burlington, and multiple national entertainment outlets. Following the broadcast, Atlantic Records released "Rollercoaster" as an official single.

== Discography ==
=== Studio albums ===
Year	Title
2009	What We Have Sewn
2010	Joshua Panda
2017	Shake It Up

=== Live albums ===
Year	Title
2012	Live in Switzerland

=== Singles ===
Year	Title	Notes
2010	"The Light Inside"	
2022	"Rollercoaster"	From American Song Contest (NBC); Atlantic Records
2023	"Serious"	With The Grift
