= For Love =

For Love may refer to:

- For Love (album), a 2012 album by Anuhea Jenkins
- "For Love", a 1991 single by Lush
- "For Love", a song by Robert Earl Keen from What I Really Mean
- "For Love", a song by Ringo Starr from Liverpool 8
- "For Love", a song by Crematory from Awake
- "For Love" (Doctors), a 2005 television episode

== See also ==
- 4 Love, a 2012 album by Kenza Farah
- For the Love, a 2007 album by Tracy Lawrence
