= Melzig =

Melzig is a German surname. Notable people with the surname include:

- Horst Melzig (1940–2022), German fencer
- Jens Melzig (born 1965), German football player
- Ola Melzig (born 1966), Swedish producer
- Siegfried Melzig (1940–2023), German football player and manager

== See also ==
- Merzig, a town in Saarland, Germany
