= Yam Haus =

American indie pop-rock band

- Origin: Minneapolis, Minnesota, U.S.
- Genres: Pop rock; pop; synth-pop
- Years active: 2017–2026
- Members: Lars Pruitt; Jake Felstow; Zach Beinlich
- Past members: Seth Blum
- Website: yamhaus.com

Yam Haus was an American indie pop-rock band with members Lars Pruitt (vocals), Jake Felstow (drums), and Zach Beinlich (bass). The band was recently signed to Big Loud Rock under Big Loud Records.

On July 23, 2026, the band posted on Instagram that they were starting an indefinite hiatus after 9 years of working together.

== History ==
Yam Haus was formed in 2017 in Minneapolis, Minnesota. Lars, Seth, and Zach all met in high school in Hudson, Wisconsin, and later met Jake in Minneapolis while he was attending college. The band started as a daily YouTube vlog to start building a fanbase. The band's name “Yam Haus” stands for “You Are Me." Since their formation, Yam Haus have found themselves selling out shows across the Midwest, and they have been included on lineups such as First Avenue's "Best New Bands" of 2018; and the 2019 Cities 97.1 KTCZ. Basilica Block Party. In 2023, the band performed at TC Summerfest, where they opened for The Killers and Death Cab for Cutie

Their first single, "West Coast," was released April 13, 2018 as a precursor to their debut album, Stargazer. In the winter of 2019, the quartet released their EP called Stargazer Sessions, which features acoustic versions of a number of songs from their debut album and "Spoke Too Soon".

In preparation for their 2020 summer headlining tour the group released their second EP, The Band Is Gonna Make It, featuring their top track, "The Thrill" which was filmed at the popular theme park Valleyfair. The Band Is Gonna Make It Tour has been postponed due to the COVID-19 pandemic.

In the winter of 2020, Yam Haus released their first Christmas EP, A Very Yam Haus Christmas, featuring the track "Auld Lang Syne." The song gained recognition as the video featured footage, filmed by Jay Christiansen, from the George Floyd protests in Minneapolis.

In 2022, Yam Haus was announced as one of the contestants on the American Song Contest on NBC. The TV program pitted bands representing every state and territory in the nation against each other to find America's top band, with Yam Haus representing Minnesota with the song "Ready to Go."

In the summer of 2022, the band began recording tracks with mixer/producer Tony Hoffer which would become the bands’ next release, Stupid & Famous.

In March 2023, Yam Haus signed with Big Loud Rock, the alternative/rock imprint of Big Loud Records. In the Spring of 2023, the band embarked on a National Tour performing multiple dates with the band Landon Conrath followed by a Fall tour with the band Sawyer.

On August 11, 2023, the band released the final single ‘Shakin’ Yer Hips’ off their EP, Stupid & Famous, which was released on October 6, 2023

On July 23, 2026, four days after playing at St. Paul Minnesota’s very own Yacht Club Music Festival, Yam Haus took to Instagram to announce an indefinite hiatus. “After nine incredible years, Yam Haus is going on an indefinite hiatus. From playing shows in friends' basements to stages bigger than we could have ever dreamed, it's been the ride of a lifetime being in this band. We're beyond grateful for everyone that's been a part of our journey, y'all are the reason we got to wake up every day and do what we love. Through all the highs and lows, bingo nights and daily vlogs, local shows and national tours, you never failed to show up. From the bottom of our hearts, thanks for everything.”

== Band members ==
- Lars Pruitt – lead vocals, rhythm guitar, and piano (2017–2026)
- Zach Beinlich – bass, lead guitar, and backing vocals (2017–2026)
- Jake Felstow – drums and percussion (2017–2026)

== Discography ==
=== Studio albums ===
- Stargazer (2018)

=== EPs ===
- Stargazer Sessions (2019)
- The Band Is Gonna Make It (2020)
- A Very Yam Haus Christmas (2020)
- Stupid & Famous (2023)

=== Singles ===
- "West Coast" (2018)
- "Get Somewhere" (2018)
- "Stargazer" (2018)
- "Groovin' (That Feel Good Song)" (2018)
- "Give It Away" (2018)
- "West Coast (Stargazer Sessions)" (2019)
- "Spoke Too Soon (Stargazer Sessions)" (2019)
- "Stargazer (Stargazer Sessions)" (2019)
- "Mama" (2019)
- "The Thrill" (2019)
- "Simplicity" (2019)
- "Wake Up" (2019
- "The Thrill (Acoustic)" (2020)
- "Cute" (2020)
- "wOw!" (2020)
- "Pop Game" (2020)
- "Deck The Halls" (2020)
- "Novocaine" (2021)
- "Give Me The Keys" (2021)
- "Whatever It Is" (2021)
- "Ready to Go" (2022)
- "Phoning It In" (2022)
- "Making Out In Cars" (2022)
- "Rafters" (2023)
- "Sandcastle" (2023)
- ”Stupid and Famous” (2023)
- “Shakin’ Yer Hips” (2023)
- “First To Try” (2024)
- ”Color You In” (2024)
- “One Bullet Left” (2025)
- ”Green Lights” (2025)
- ”Misery Island” (2025)
- “Spit In My Face” (2025)
- ”Dollar Store Mansion” (2025)
- “Arrest Myself” (2025)
- “Always Falling In Love” (2025) featuring Sydney Quiseng
- “Ain’t Dead Yet” (2025)
- ”One Way Road” (2026) featuring Cory Wong
