= Mari (musician) =

American EDM musician (born 1985)

- Also known as: Mari Burelle-Valencia
- Born: Mari Jacqueline Burelle; April 4, 1985 (age 41); Boston, Massachusetts
- Origin: Queens, New York
- Genres: Christian EDM, Christian pop
- Occupations: Singer, songwriter, pianist
- Instruments: vocals, piano
- Years active: 2016–present
- Label: Elevate
- Website: mariburelle.com

Mari Burelle-Valencia (born April 4, 1985, as Mari Jacqueline Burelle), who goes by the stage name stylized as MARi, is an American Christian musician and pianist, who primarily plays a style of Christian EDM. She has released one musical work, Treasure (2016).

== Early life ==
She was born Mari Jacqueline Burelle on April 4, 1985, in Boston while she moved to Queens, New York, in 2002, and was raised by adoptive parents, while she started playing the piano when she was young. She is of Puerto Rican and Cuban descent.

== Music career ==
Her music recording career started in 2016, with the studio album, Treasure, that was released on May 27, 2016, from Elevate Entertainment.

MARi would later represent New Hampshire in the American Song Contest, qualifying for the semi-finals on a public vote before being eliminated at this stage.

== Personal life ==
She married Ivan Valencia in 2005.

== Discography ==
- Treasure (May 27, 2016, Elevate)
