= Judd Hoos =

American rock band

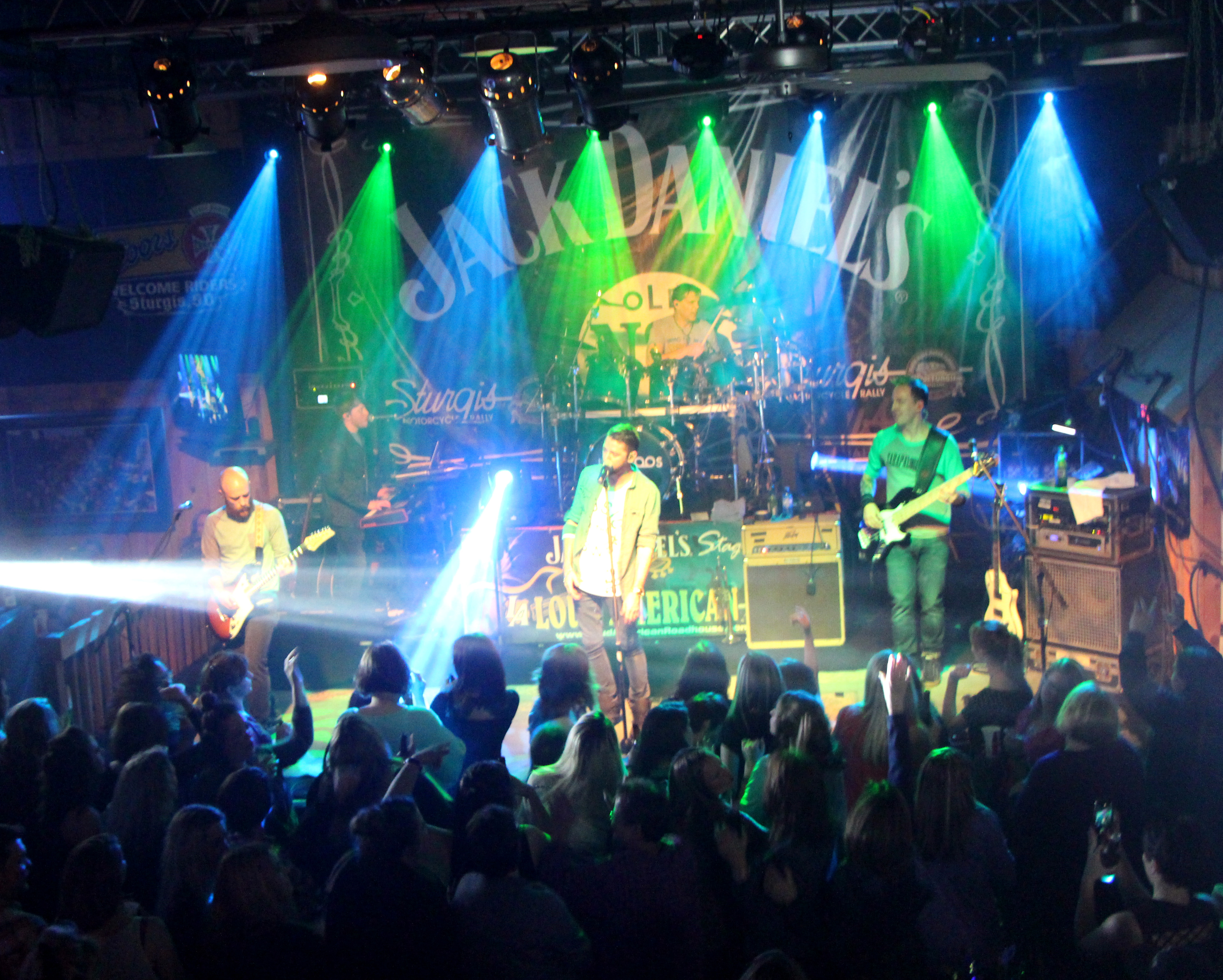
- Judd Hoos playing in Sturgis on April 16, 2016.

Background information
- Origin: Sturgis, South Dakota, USA
- Genres: Rock
- Years active: 2004–present
- Labels: Independent
- Members: Shane Funk; Andy Young; Keithan Funk; Chase Huseby
- Past members: Tyler Bills; Chris Hornick; Bob Zwart; Drew Lerdal; Zach Fronce; Devin Bills

Judd Hoos is an American rock band based in Sturgis, South Dakota. The band's line up consists of Tyler Bills (vocals and guitar), Shane Funk (drums), Andy Young (guitar), Kiethan Funk, and Chase Huseby (bass).

The band represented South Dakota In the American Song Contest in 2022.

The band released a new single "Dirty Work" on June 8, 2018. Their previous single, "Breathe In," charted 23 on the iTunes new rock single releases. "Breathe In," is a follow-up to their "Billboard" single released a year prior that charted 83 on the iTunes new rock single releases. "Billboard" is on the soundtrack to the 2016 film Tater Tot & Patton.

== History ==
=== Formation (2004) ===
The band formed when Bob Zwart left regional rock band Zwartè in 2004 to audition as a front man for a band being formed in Sturgis, South Dakota by Shane Funk and original guitarist, Drew Lerdal. Bob had been the drummer for Zwartè for 14 years and upon his departure recruited former Zwartè bassist Chris Hornick.

=== Touring (2004-present) ===
The band's tour primarily includes shows in South Dakota, North Dakota, Wyoming, Nebraska, Colorado, Minnesota, and Iowa.

=== Lineup change (2016) ===
In February 2016 Original front-man Bob Zwart retired from the band.

=== Lineup change (2021) ===
In 2021 Chris Hornick retired from the band and added Chase Huseby and Keithan Funk.

=== Management ===
In 2003 Judd Hoos signed with HomeSlice Artist Management, a subsidiary of the HomeSlice Group, an entertainment and media company that is the worldwide exclusive licensing agent of the Sturgis Motorcycle Rally.

== Discography ==
The band independently released their debut album Best Intentions in 2007 that was later re-mastered and re-released in 2008 as Better Intentions. Better Intentions featured the band's singles "Best Intentions" and "Just Because." Their 2013 follow-up album titled Two featured their single "Stand Up" that received regional airplay thanks to a number of independent Program Directors at different radio stations across the Midwest. On July 7, 2015 the band released a single titled "Billboard" followed up by a new single titled "Breathe In" on May 6, 2016. The bands' single "House Party" was released on June 17, 2016 in conjunction with their EP release. Their latest full-length album Music In The Dark was released on June 2, 2017.

=== Studio albums ===
- Better Intentions
  - Released 2008
  - Label: Self-Released
- Two
  - Released 2013
  - Label: Self-Released
- Music In The Dark
  - Released 2017
  - Label: Self-Released

=== Singles ===
- "Best Intentions" (2008)
- "Just Because" (2008)
- "Stand Up" (2013)
- "Billboard" (2015)
- "Breathe In" (2016)
- "House Party" (2016)
- "Dirty Work" (2018)

=== Music videos ===
| Year | Video | Director |
|---|---|---|
| 2021 | Numb | Russ Hadden |
| 2021 | Honest, Hey | Chris Hornick |
| 2021 | Wind Blows | Chris Hornick |
| 2020 | Lights On | Chris Hornick |
| 2018 | Say My Name | Tyler Horner |
| 2017 | Awake | Paul Ryan |
| 2017 | Breathe In | Marc Linn |
| 2013 | Stand Up | Chris Hornick |
| 2015 | Billboard | Marc Linn |
