= Grant Knoche =

American musician and performer

- Born: Grant Christian Knoche; August 23, 2002 (age 24); Dallas, Texas, US
- Genre: Pop
- Occupations: Musician; Songwriter; Producer; Actor
- Years active: 2013–present
- Label: Independent
- Formerly of: Kidz Bop Kids (2013-16)
- Website: grantknoche.com

Grant Christian Knoche (born August 23, 2002) is an American singer-songwriter, record producer, and actor.

He first gained prominence as a child performer in the group Kidz Bop Kids from 2013 to 2016. Knoche later expanded his recognition through television appearances, including on Bounce TV’s Family Time (2014), Nickelodeon's Nicky, Ricky, Dicky & Dawn (2017), and as a contestant on NBC's American Song Contest (2022), where he finished in fourth place.

Since 2017, Knoche has been releasing music as an independent artist, with two full-length records: I Could Die Just Thinking Of Us (2023) and Good Luck Getting Over Me (2025). In addition to his solo career, he has written songs and produced for various artists, including Christina Aguilera, Jess Glynne, and Victoria Justice, among others.

== Life and career ==
=== Early life ===
Grant Knoche is from Dallas, Texas. He attended Texas Virtual Academy, an online charter school.

=== 2013–2016: Early career (Kidz Bop Kids) ===
Knoche began performing with the Kidz Bop Kids at age 10 and remained for about four years, contributing to 12 album releases and performing in 162 concerts. He has described the experience as formative, saying it "set me up for the rest of my life as an artist and a musician," and that he "would go back and do it again." In 2016, he was part of a lineup with Ashlynn Chong, Sela Hack, and Matt Martinez. With the group, Knoche performed child-friendly renditions of popular songs, blending live and pre-recorded vocals with simple choreography. Their shows emphasized audience participation, particularly for young attendees.

=== 2017–2022: Solo career and American Song Contest ===
Following his time with Kidz Bop, Knoche launched his career as a solo artist. In 2017, he released his debut single, "Downpour", which introduced his style as a singer-songwriter. The following year, he released the music video for "Unfair", a song that addresses the highs and lows of a relationship and reflects a more vulnerable side through its lyrics.

In 2022, Knoche represented Texas in the American Song Contest with his song "Mr. Independent". He reached the final round, placing fourth.

=== 2023-2024: I Could Die Just Thinking Of Us ===
In 2023, he re-released his single "First Hello" with singer Vincint.

In 2024, Knoche released the single and music video for "Intrusive Thoughts".

=== 2025-present: Good Luck Getting Over Me ===
On February 7, 2025, Knoche released the single "Autopilot" as the lead track from his sophomore full-length record; the following single "Talk" received critical acclaim, with Stereogum listing it as the fifth best pop song of 2025. To support his album, Knoche announced on Instagram he is going on a 9-date headlining tour, kicking off in Toronto, Ontario on April 12, 2026 before wrapping up on June 29, 2026 in Portland, Oregon.

== Personal life ==
Knoche came out as bisexual in 2022.

== Discography ==
Studio albums

- I Could Die Just Thinking Of Us (2023)
- Good Luck Getting Over Me (2025)

EPs

- Color Me Blue (2020)
- First Hello (2021)

Singles

List of singles as lead artist, showing year released and album name
Title	Year	Album	Ref.
Downpour	2017	Non-album single	
Unfair	2018	Non-album single	
Emotions	2019	Color Me Blue	
Dial Tone	2019	Color Me Blue	
Sorry For the Honesty	2019	Color Me Blue	
Don't Make Me Make You Cry	2020	Color Me Blue	
Paper House	2020	Color Me Blue	
As it Should	2020	Color Me Blue	
18	2020	Color Me Blue	
The Intro	2021	First Hello	
Overexposed	2021	First Hello	
Custom Hell	2021	First Hello	
Wish U Were Dead	2022	First Hello	
Mr. Independent	2022	American Song Contest	
Icarus	2022	I Could Die Just Thinking Of Us	
First Hello	2022	First Hello	
You Don't Have To Talk	2022	First Hello	
Another Reason	2023	I Could Die Just Thinking Of Us	
Intrusive Thoughts	2023	I Could Die Just Thinking Of Us	
Please Hurry	2023	I Could Die Just Thinking Of Us	
First Hello (Remix)	2023	The First Hellos	
First Hello (Vincint Remix)	2023	The First Hellos	
Look At Me Right Now	2023	I Could Die Just Thinking Of Us	
Out Of The Blue	2023	I Could Die Just Thinking Of Us	
Dear Life (with Tayler Buono)	2023	Non-album single	
Look At Me Right Now (Man Down! Remix)	2023	I Could Die Just Thinking Of Us (Deluxe)	
Chemicals	2024	I Could Die Just Thinking Of Us (Deluxe)	
Intrusive Thoughts (Man Down! Remix)	2024	Non-album single	
Mosquitoes	2024	Non-album single	
Autopilot	2025	Good Luck Getting Over Me	
Talk	2025	Good Luck Getting Over Me	
Movie Star	2025	Good Luck Getting Over Me	
Woohoo	2025	Good Luck Getting Over Me	
I Don't Mind	2025	Good Luck Getting Over Me	
I Miss Your Love	2025	Good Luck Getting Over Me	
Stripped	2025	Good Luck Getting Over Me	

=== Production discography ===
Title	Year	Artist	Album	Songwriting	Producing
"Only a Stranger"	2023	Victoria Justice	Non-album singles	check	
"Tripped"	2024	Victoria Justice	Non-album singles	check	check
"Hate the World Without U (Maddy's Song)"	2024	Victoria Justice	Non-album singles	check	check
"Superscar"	2024	Adéla	The Provocateur	check	check
"Move Like That" (Performed by Momo)	2025	Twice	Ten: The Story Goes On	check	
"XO, My Cyberlove"	2026	Chuu	XO, My Cyberlove	check	

== Filmography ==
Year	Title	Role	Notes	Ref
2017	Boy Squad	Himself	18 Episodes	
2018	Nicky, Ricky, Dicky & Dawn	Liam	2 Episodes	
2018	Chicken Girls	Jules	7 Episodes	
2018	Total Eclipse	Jules	3 Episodes	
2022	American Song Contest	Himself	Contestant; 3 Episodes	
