= Kid Albums =

US record chart published by Billboard

Kid Albums (formerly known as Top Kid Audio) is a music chart published weekly by Billboard magazine which ranks the top selling children's music albums in the United States. The chart debuted on the issue dated September 9, 1995. It originally began as a 15-position chart, but has now been expanded to 25. Rankings are compiled by point-of-purchase sales obtained by Nielsen Soundscan data and from legal digital downloads from an all music digital retailers.

The Kid Albums chart features full-length albums that are geared towards children or preteen audiences. Some genres can extend to music for younger children around 1 to 5 years in age, like lullabies, to soundtracks for films that are targeted to children of the age 5-9 to pop, teen pop and other subdivisions of it. Studio albums, EPs, compilation albums and soundtracks are all eligible for the chart.

The first number-one title on the Top Kid Audio chart was a compilation album from Walt Disney Records titled Classic Disney, Vol. 1. As of the week of August 1, 2026, the number-one album on the chart is the Descendants: Wicked Wonderland (soundtrack)

== Year-End #1 Kid Albums ==
| Year | Album | Artist | Ref. |
|---|---|---|---|
| 2006 | High School Musical | Various Artists | |
| 2007 | Hannah Montana | Miley Cyrus | |
| 2008 | Hannah Montana 2: Meet Miley Cyrus | Miley Cyrus | |
| 2009 | Hannah Montana 3 | Miley Cyrus | |
| 2010 | Kidz Bop 18 | Kidz Bop | |
| 2011 | BTR | Big Time Rush | |
| 2012 | Kidz Bop 21 | Kidz Bop | |
| 2013 | Kidz Bop 23 | Kidz Bop | |
| 2014 | Kidz Bop 25 | Kidz Bop | |
| 2015 | Kidz Bop 27 | Kidz Bop | |
| 2016 | Kidz Bop 31 | Kidz Bop | |
| 2017 | Moana | Various Artists | |
| 2018 | Moana | Various Artists | |
| 2019 | Mary Poppins Returns | Marc Shaiman & Scott Wittman | |
| 2020 | Frozen 2 | Various Artists | |
| 2021 | A Charlie Brown Christmas | Vince Guaraldi | |
| 2022 | Encanto | Various Artists | |
| 2023 | A Charlie Brown Christmas | Vince Guaraldi | |
| 2024 | A Charlie Brown Christmas | Vince Guaraldi | |
| 2025 | Moana | Various Artists | |
