= Anuhea =

Hawaiian musician (born 1985)

Anuhea Jenkins
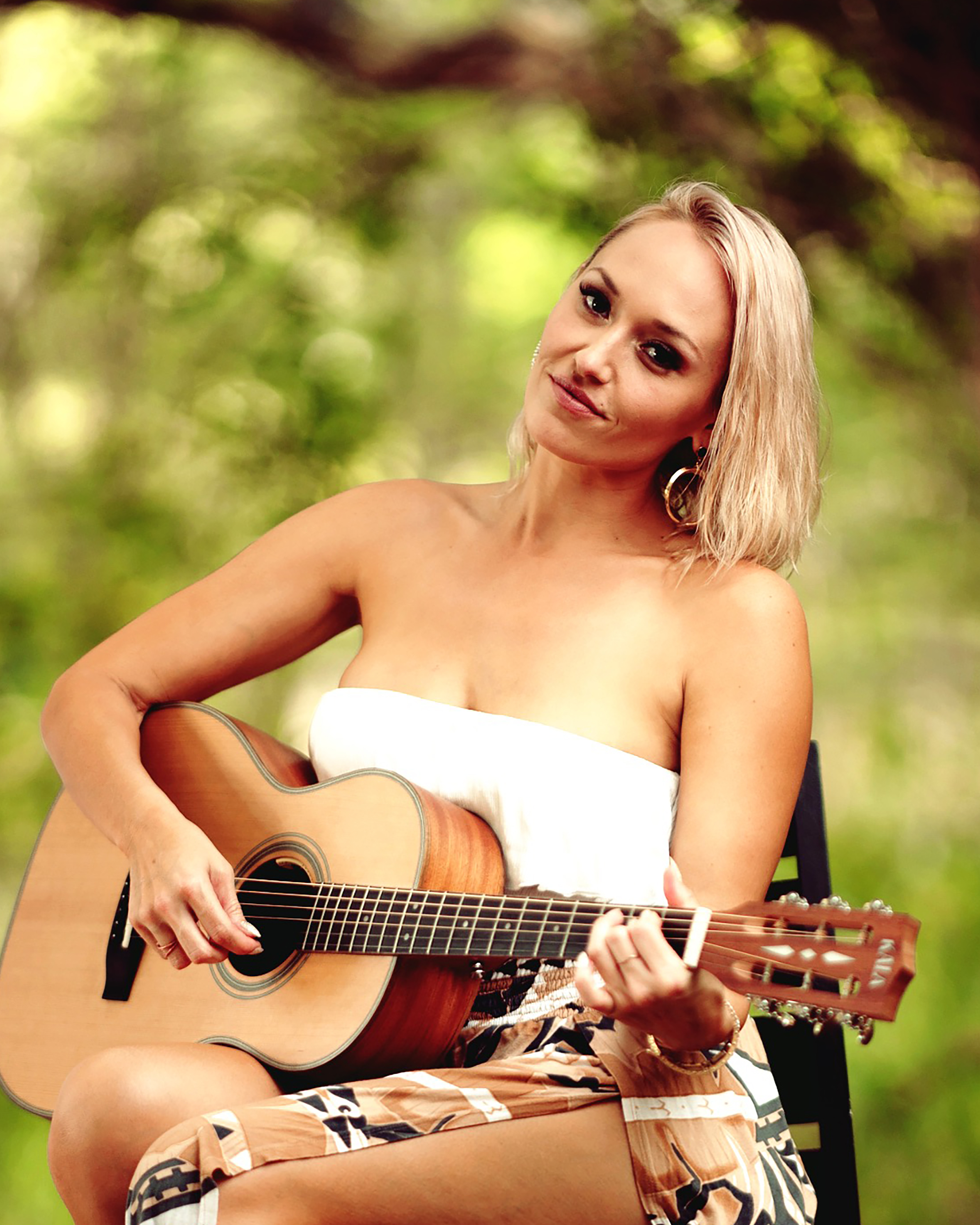
- Anuhea in 2019
- Born: Rylee Anuheakeʻalaokalokelani Jenkins; December 10, 1985 (age 40); Maui County, Hawaii, U.S.
- Other name: Anuhea
- Education: Kamehameha Schools; Chapman University
- Occupations: Musician; singer; songwriter
- Musical career
- Origin: Makawao, Hawaii, U.S.
- Genres: Reggae; pop; folk
- Instruments: Guitar; ukulele

Rylee Anuheakeʻalaokalokelani Jenkins (born December 10, 1985), known professionally as Anuhea, is a Hawaiian musician, singer, and songwriter.

== Early life and education ==
Anuhea grew up in Makawao, Hawaii on the island of Maui. She is of Hawaiian, Chinese, German, Welsh, and Native American descent. Anuhea graduated from Kamehameha Schools in 2003. Upon graduation she attended Chapman University in Orange County, California but left in 2005. She competed in the 2006 Miss Maui Pageant where she won Miss Congeniality and 2nd Runner Up.

== Career ==
Anuhea's self-titled debut album Anuhea was released on April 21, 2009. Her second album For Love was released on February 14, 2012. She recorded a live album titled Butterflies: Anuhea Live that was released on September 17, 2013, through Mailboat Records, a record label started by Jimmy Buffett. Anuhea released a Christmas EP All Is Bright on November 13, 2015, and another EP titled Shoulders on February 5, 2016. Her latest album Follow Me was released on October 6, 2017.

The single "Right Love, Wrong Time" was picked as iTunes (USA) single of the week. In May 2010, Anuhea recorded and released on iTunes a remake of Estelle's "Come Over Love" which hit number one on many Hawaii and Pacific Island radio stations. On May 30, 2010, Anuhea won her first 2 Na Hoku Hanohano awards for Most Promising Artist and Contemporary Album of the Year. She has performed and toured with artists such as SOJA, Kimie, Tenelle, George 'Fiji' Veikoso, Cas Haley, Jack Johnson, Ziggy Marley, Taj Mahal and Jake Shimabukuro.

== Personal life ==
Anuhea's aunt Nalani Jenkins Choy is a member of Na Leo Pilimehana, the most successful Hawaiian female music group to date. She is close friends with fellow Hawaiian singer and former Kamehameha classmate Kimie Miner. In November 2013, Anuhea gave birth to her son Ikena Jack.

== Discography ==
=== Albums ===
- Anuhea (2009)
- For Love (2012)
- Butterflies: Anuhea Live (2013)
- Follow Me (2017)
- Follow Me: Deluxe Hawaii Edition (2018)
- A10: Best of Anuhea (2019)
- Lotus (2024)

=== Extended Plays ===
- All Is Bright (2015)
- Shoulders (2016)
