= AleXa =

American singer (born 1996)

- AleXa in 2025

Background information
- Also known as: Alex Christine, 김세리
- Born: Alexaundra Christine Schneiderman; December 9, 1996 (age 29); Tulsa, Oklahoma, U.S.
- Origin: South Korea
- Genres: K-pop; EDM; pop-punk
- Occupation: Singer
- Instrument: Vocals
- Years active: 2019–present

Korean name
- Hangul: 김세리
- RR: Gim Seri
- MR: Kim Seri

Alexaundra Christine Schneiderman (born December 9, 1996), known professionally as AleXa (Korean: 알렉사) or Kim Se-ri (김세리), formerly Alex Christine (알렉스 크리스틴), is an American singer based in South Korea. She debuted as a K-pop singer in October 2019. In 2022, she represented her home state Oklahoma in NBC's American Song Contest with the song "Wonderland" where she won with 710 points.

== Early life ==
AleXa was born as Alexaundra Christine Schneiderman on December 9, 1996, in Tulsa, Oklahoma, to an American father and a South Korean mother. AleXa's mother was adopted at age five by her adoptive American parents from an orphanage in Goyang, Gyeonggi Province.

As a child, AleXa began taking dance classes (ballet, jazz, hip hop, tap, pom) around the age of two. She attended Jenks High School where she was a member of the show choir Trojanaires, which competed nationally. AleXa was an avid K-pop fan and created an Instagram dedicated to covering K-pop songs and choreography while in school.

== Musical career ==
=== 2016–2018: Rising Legends and Produce 48 ===
In 2016, under the name Alex Christine, she participated in the Rising Legends online audition run by Soompi. The competition was organized in partnership with JYP Entertainment. In 2017, she competed on Rising Legends again when Soompi partnered with Cube Entertainment. Despite placing #1 in the dance category the first time and the overall winner the second, she did not make it into either of the companies' trainee programs and instead signed with ZB Label as their first (and as of 2022, only) in-house artist. In 2018, AleXa competed on Produce 48 and was eliminated in the first round at #82.

=== 2019–2021: Debut, Do or Die and Decoherence ===
In 2019, under the name AleXa, she released her debut single album titled "Bomb" on October 19. She collaborated with rock band Diablo to release a rock version of the song on December 13.

In 2020, she announced her first mini-album with the release of the trailer "A.I Trooper" on February 24. The music video "Do or Die" was released on March 6. The mini-album, also titled Do or Die, was released on April 1. AleXa collaborated with girl group Dreamcatcher and boy group IN2IT to release the single "Be The Future" for the Millenasia Project on May 6. The project, supported by UNESCO's Global Education Coalition, was released to bring attention to the importance of education and safety during the COVID-19 pandemic. On July 16, AleXa released the music video for "Villain" (빌런) from her upcoming second mini-album titled Decoherence. She released the mini-album alongside the music video for "Revolution" on October 21.

In 2021, AleXa released her digital single "Never Let You Go" (오랜만이야) on January 14. She collaborated with rock band Onewe to release an acoustic version of the song on February 8. On April 12, AleXa released the OST "I Miss You Every Day" for the TV Chosun drama Somehow Family.

On May 18, Spotify announced its third RADAR collaboration in the MENA region, bringing together AleXa and Bader AlShuaibi, a Kuwaiti-Saudi pop singer. The song "Is It On" was released on May 21. AleXa released her second single album ReviveR and its lead track "Xtra" on July 1. She collaborated with all-female rock band Rolling Quartz to release the rock version of the song on August 25.

=== 2022–2024: "Tattoo", American Song Contest, tours across the United States, Girls Gone Vogue, "Juliet" ===
In 2022, AleXa released her third single album Tattoo on January 6. In May 2022, AleXa competed in the American Song Contest, representing Oklahoma with the song "Wonderland", and won.

On August 3, she announced her US tour, touring eight different cities in October.

On October 20, ZB Label announced that AleXa would have a comeback on November 11. On October 22, the first concept trailer for their first mini-album, Girls Gone Vogue, was released. On October 31, ZB Label's album promotion for the upcoming album Girls Gone Vogue was postponed due to the Seoul Halloween crowd crush.

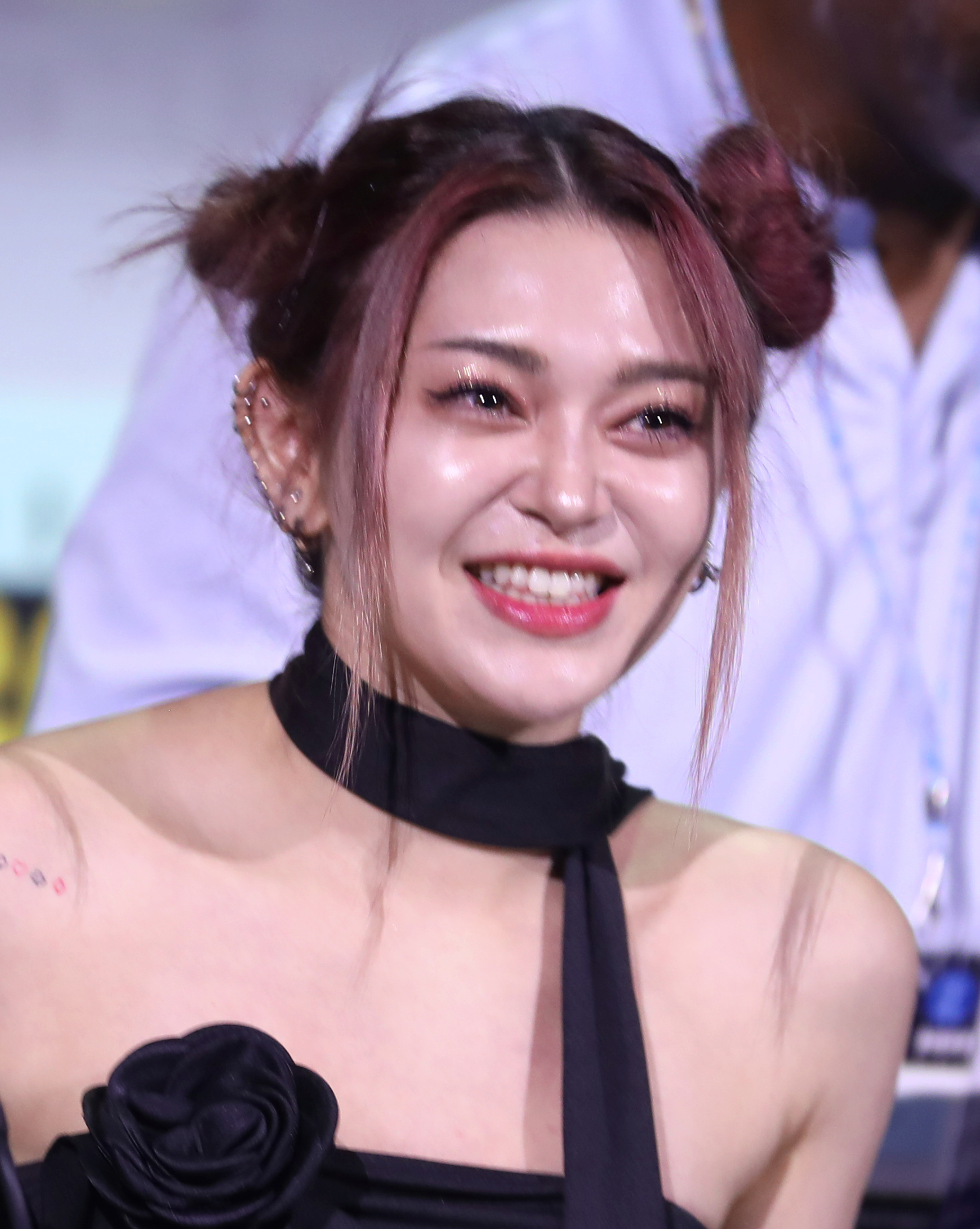
AleXa in 2023

In April 2023, AleXa signed with Eshy Gazit's label Intertwine for her U.S. promotion.

On June 1, 2023, ZB Label announced that AleXa would be making a comeback with the digital single "Juliet", which was released on June 9, with an accompanied music video filmed in Jeju Island.

On June 13, 2023, AleXa was cast in the American animated series "Ghosts of Ruin" alongside Justin Long, Michael Longfellow, Rosario Dawson & Tony Revolori. The animated series is set to debut this fall via Gala Film, the film and television division of content and technology user Gala. AleXa will be the voice of Juggernaut, an irreverent and hyper pro-gamer and content creator.

On July 22, 2023, AleXa attended "San Diego Comic-Con 2023", to promote her upcoming appearance as character Juggernaut in animated series "Ghosts of Ruin".

On February 23, 2024, AleXa released the digital single "Sick". The music video for the song was released the following day. "Sick" is part of AleXa's new American studio album and is a pop-punk song.

On December 20, 2024, AleXa announced that the digital single "Enemy" will be released on November 22, 2024. Following its release and according to her, the song was recorded during Back in Vogue era in 2022, and was released without her knowing. Additionally, she stated that there would be no comeback in the near future.

On December 12, AleXa announced the digital single "Under The Armor", to be released the next day. This release was also reported to have been recorded four years prior to its release. In a late December live, she hinted at her contract with ZB Label ending and not being renewed.

=== 2025–present: Departure from ZB Label and name change, Sugarcoat, upcoming re-debut ===
On February 20, 2025, AleXa revealed through a live that she is preparing for a re-debut in April.

On March 5, 2025, she announced that she is "stepping forward into [her] new artist journey", departing from her former label and creating new social media accounts, since the former label revoked AleXa's access to old social media accounts. In leaving her label, AleXa stated that she wanted to rebrand herself and no longer go by the monicker "AleXa", and instead go by her Korean name, 김세리. As of current day, to prevent confusion, she has stated that she is fine with being addressed as either "AleXa" or "세리(Se-ri)", as many fans were confused by the rebrand attempt.

On March 7, ZB Label released her first full-length album titled Sugarcoat, which was her last release with her label. The album features her previous pop-punk singles, such as "Sick", "I'm Okay", and "Distraction".

In July, 2025, AleXa joined Park Junhee's cover of "Free" from KPop Demon Hunters.

On December 2, 2025, Swedish public broadcaster SVT officially revealed that AleXa would participate in its national song contest Melodifestivalen 2026, with her song "Tongue Tied". On February 28, 2026 she performed in the fifth heat in Sundsvall, where she qualified to the final qualification round. She did not make it to the final.

She is also one of the songwriters for Park Junhee's song "Deep Dive" which will represent South Korea in the Eurovision Song Contest Asia 2026.

== Other ventures ==
From June 23 to August 4, 2020, AleXa was a guest host on the podcast How Did I Get Here? often shortened to "HDIGH". On August 7, 2020, Dive Studios announced on their Twitter that she would become a permanent fixture on the show alongside original host Jae Park from Korean band Day6. The podcast won the "People's Choice" and "Entertainment" category at the Podcast Award in 2020.

== Discography ==
=== Studio albums ===
Title	Details
Sugarcoat	Released: March 7, 2025; Label: Interwine Music, ZB Label; Formats: Track listing: 1. "Sugarcoat"; 2. "Something New"; 3. "Arrogant"; 4. "Fatal"; 5. "Sick"; 6. "I'm Okay"; 7. "Distraction"; 8. "Joy of Missing Out"; 9. "Under the Armor"; 10. "Enemy"

=== Extended plays ===
Title	Details	Peak chart positions	Sales
Title	Details	KOR	Sales
Do or Die	Released: April 1, 2020; Label: ZB Label, Dreamus Company; Formats: CD, digital download, streaming; Track listing: 1. "A.I Trooper"; 2. "Do or Die"; 3. "Kitty Run"; 4. "Bomb" (Korean version); 5. "Bomb" (EDM remix); 6. "Do or Die" (instrumental); 7. "Bomb" (instrumental); 8. "A.I Tropper" (instrumental)	—	—N/a
Decoherence	Released: October 21, 2020; Label: ZB Label, Warner Music Korea; Formats: CD, digital download, streaming; Track listing: 1. "Villain"; 2. "Burn Out"; 3. "Revolution"; 4. "Moon and Back"; 5. "Revolution" (English version); 6. "Revolution" (instrumental); 7. "Villain" (instrumental); 8. "Allegory of the Cave" (동굴의 비유) (CD Only)	67	KOR: 1,801
Girls Gone Vogue	Released: November 11, 2022; Label: ZB Label, Warner Music Korea; Formats: CD, digital download, streaming; Track listing: 1. "Star" (feat. Moon Byul of Mamamoo); 2. "Back in Vogue"; 3. "Endorphine"; 4. "Black Out"; 5. "Please Try Again"; 6. "Back in Vogue" (instrumental)	54	KOR: 3,922
Juliet	Released: June 9, 2023; Label: ZB Label, Dreamus Company; Formats: CD, digital download, streaming; Track listing: 1. "Juliet"; 2. "Juliet" (instrumental); 3. "Juliet" (Spanish Version); 4. "Juliet" (Retro Electro Mix); 5. "Juliet" (Disco remix); 6. "Juliet" (City Pop Mix); 7. "Juliet" (Drumline Trap Mix); 8. "Juliet" (Sped Up Version)	—	—N/a
"—" denotes a recording that did not chart or was not released in that region.

=== Single albums ===
Title	Details	Peak chart positions	Sales
Title	Details	KOR	Sales
Bomb	Released: October 21, 2019; Label: ZB Label, Sony Music Korea; Formats: CD, digital download, streaming; Track listing: 1. "Bomb"; 2. "Bomb" (English version); 3. "Bomb" (instrumental)	—	—N/a
ReviveR	Released: July 1, 2021; Label: ZB Label, Warner Music Korea; Formats: CD, digital download, streaming; Track listing: 1. "Xtra"; 2. "Obsession"; 3. "Xtra" (instrumental)	41	KOR: 386
Tattoo	Released: January 6, 2022; Label: ZB Label, Sony Music Korea; Formats: CD, digital download, streaming; Track listing: 1. "Tattoo"; 2. "Tattoo" (instrumental)	50	KOR: 298
"—" denotes a recording that did not chart or was not released in that region.

=== Singles ===
Title	Year	Peak chart positions			Album
Title	Year	US Pop	US World	SWE	Album
"Bomb"	2019	—	7	—	Bomb
"A.I Trooper"	2020	—	—	—	Do or Die
"Do or Die"	2020	—	23	—	Do or Die
"We Can"	2020	—	—	—	Non-album single
"Villain" (빌런)	2020	—	—	—	Decoherence
"Revolution"	2020	—	—	—	Decoherence
"Never Let You Go" (오랜만이야)	2021	—	—	—	Non-album single
"Xtra"	2021	—	—	—	ReviveR
"Tattoo"	2022	—	—	—	Tattoo
"Wonderland"	2022	38	—	—	Non-album single
"Back in Vogue"	2022	—	—	—	Girls Gone Vogue
"Juliet"	2023	—	—	—	Juliet
"Sick"	2024	—	—	—	Sugarcoat
"I'm Okay"	2024	—	—	—	Sugarcoat
"Distraction"	2024	—	—	—	Sugarcoat
"Joy of Missing Out"	2024	—	—	—	Sugarcoat
"Enemy"	2024	—	—	—	Sugarcoat
"Under the Armor"	2024	—	—	—	Sugarcoat
"Sugarcoat"	2025	—	—	—	Sugarcoat
"Vital Check" (featuring Kik5o)	2025	—	—	—	Non-album singles
"Tongue Tied"	2026	—	—	12	Non-album singles
"4EVR"	2026	—	—	—	Non-album singles
"—" denotes releases that did not chart or were not released in that region.

=== Collaborations ===
Title	Year	Album
"Be the Future" (with Dreamcatcher & In2It) (As Millenasia Project)	2020	Non-album singles
"Rule the World" (with TheFatRat)	2020	Non-album singles
"Is It On" (with Bader AlShuaibi)	2021	Non-album singles
"Summer Breeze" (나만 없어, 여름) (with Daedo)	2021	Non-album singles
"BETTER TOGETHER (To Beat Covid-19) [Prod. SL.P]" (among 2021 New Beginnings with K-Pop Stars)	2021	Non-album singles
"Star" (with Moonbyul of Mamamoo)	2022	Girls Gone Vogue
"MBTI" (with Just B)	2023	Non-album singles
"Running Out of Love" (with BADS)	2023	Non-album singles
"Deep Dive" (Songwriter for Park Junhee)	2026	Non-album singles

=== OST ===
Title	Year	Album
"I Miss You Every Day" (어제도 오늘도 너무 보고싶어)	2021	Somehow Family OST Part 9
"Midnight Sun" (백야)	2022	The Broken Ring: This Marriage Will Fail Anyway OST Part 1
"Shining Star"	2023	Bastions OST Part 1

=== Videography ===
Title	Year	Album	Director
"Bomb"	2019	Bomb	Jihyoung Shim ZB
"A.I Trooper"	2020	Do or Die	Jihyoung Shim ZB
"Do or Die"	2020	Do or Die	Jihyoung Shim ZB
"We Can"	2020	Non-album single	Jihyoung Shim ZB
"Villan"	2020	Decoherence	Jihyoung Shim ZB
"Revolution"	2020	Decoherence	Jihyoung Shim ZB
"Never Let You Go" (오랜만이야)	2021	Non-album single	Moon Min-joo
"Xtra"	2021	ReviveR	Park Sang-won ZB
"Summer Breeze" (나만 없어, 여름) (with Daedo)	2021	Non-album single	Park Sang-won ZB
"Tattoo"	2022	Tattoo	Park Sang-won ZB
"Wonderland"	2022	Non-album single	Unknown
"Back in Vogue"	2022	Girls Gone Vogue	Lee Ki-seok ZB
"MBTI" (with Just B)	2023	Non-album single	Ji-hyung Shim ZB
"Juliet"	2023	Juliet	Heo Jin-hyeon ZB
"Sick"	2024	Sugarcoat	Unknown
"I'm Okay"	2024	Sugarcoat	Angelina Foss
"Distraction"	2024	Sugarcoat	Unknown
"Under the Armor"	2024	Sugarcoat	Angelina Foss
"Sugarcoat"	2025	Sugarcoat	Unknown
"Vital Check" (Kik5o feat. AleXa)	2025	Non-album single	Unknown

== Songwriting credits ==
List of songs, showing year released, artist name, and name of the album
Title	Year	Artist	Album	Lyricist	Composer
"Revolution"	2019	Herself	Decoherence	Yes	No
"Villain"	2019	Herself	Decoherence	Yes	No
"Moon & Back"	2019	Herself	Decoherence	Yes	No
"Rule the World"	2019	Herself	Non-album single	Yes	No
"Xtra"	2021	Herself	ReviveR	Yes	No
"Obsession"	2021	Herself	ReviveR	Yes	Yes
"Black out"	2022	Herself	Girls Gone Vogue	Yes	Yes
"Please Try Again"	2022	Herself	Girls Gone Vogue	Yes	No
"Juliet"	2023	Herself	Juliet	Yes	Yes
"I'm okay"	2024	Herself	Non-album singles	Yes	Yes
"Distraction"	2024	Herself	Non-album singles	Yes	No
"Deep Dive"	2026	Park Junhee	Non-album singles	Yes	No

== Concerts ==
=== Headlining ===
Tours

- U.S. Tour (2022)

Date	City	Country	Venue
October 18	Jersey City	United States	White Eagle Hall
October 20	San Juan	Puerto Rico	Teatro Arriví
October 22	Atlanta	United States	Ferst Center of The Arts
October 23	Chicago	United States	Avondale Music Hall
October 25	Oklahoma City	United States	Tower Theater
October 27	Houston	United States	Hobby Center
October 28	San Francisco	United States	Marine's Memorial Theater
October 30	Los Angeles	United States	Avalon Hollywood

- Girls Gone Vogue Tour (2023)

Date	City	Country	Venue
March 23	Auckland	New Zealand	Studio The Venue
March 29	Sydney	Australia	Metro Theatre
April 1	Melbourne	Australia	170 Russell

- Sick of You U.S. tour (2024)

Date	City	Country	Venue
March 29	New York City	United States	Music Hall of Williamsburg
March 31	Chicago	United States	Distro Music Hall
April 2	Atlanta	United States	Masquerade Hall
April 4	Tulsa	United States	Cain's Ballroom
April 5	Fort Worth	United States	Ridglea Theater
April 7	Los Angeles	United States	Teragram Ballroom

Special concerts

- Mini-concert: Welcome To Wonderland (2022)

Online concerts

- Ctrl+AleXa (2020)
- AleXa- Global Fan Party (2021)

Special Stages

- KAMP Singapore (2019)
- FutureCon (online) (2020)
- Kpop Superfest (2021)
- SNL Korea (2022)
- LA Clippers vs Philadelphia 76ers 1/17 half time show (2023)
- Arthur Ash Kids Day (2023)
- Jingle Ball Tour (2023)
- Kelly Clarkson show (2024)
- KCON (music festival) (2024)

== Filmography ==
=== Web series ===
Year	Title	Role	Notes	Ref.
2023	Ghosts of Ruin	Juggernaut	Main role	

=== Film ===
Year	Title	Role	Notes
2022	Urban Myths	Se-ri	Segment: "Escape Games"

=== Television shows ===
Year	Title	Role	Notes	Ref.
2018	Produce 48	Herself	As Alex Christine	
2022	American Song Contest	Herself	Representing Oklahoma	
2023	Codename: Busan	Co-Host	Arirang TV	
2023	K-Chat	Teacher	Arirang TV	

=== Web shows ===
Year	Title	Role	Notes	Ref.
2022	Virtual Top Ten Song	Host	YouTube	
2023	Hwaiting (Season 3)	Cast member	YouTube	

=== Podcast host ===
Year	Title	Role	Ref.
2020–2021	How Did I Get Here?	Co-host	

=== Hosting ===
Year	Title	Notes	Ref.
2022	2022 Changwon K-Pop World Festival	with Kim Myung-soo and Sua (Billlie)	

== Awards and nominations ==
Award ceremony	Year	Category	Nominee/Work(s)	Result	Ref.
Asia Artist Awards	2020	Focus Singer Award	AleXa	Won	
Asia Artist Awards	2021	Potential Award – Female	AleXa	Won	
Asia Artist Awards	2022	Icon Award – Singer	AleXa	Won	
American Song Contest	2022	—N/a	"Wonderland"	First	
K-Global Heart Dream Awards	2022	K-Global Rising Star Award	AleXa	Won	
K-Global Heart Dream Awards	2023	K-Global Music Icon Award	AleXa	Won	
K-World Dream Awards	2020	Next Artist Award	AleXa	Won	
