= Wonderland (AleXa song) =

- Original digital cover

Single by AleXa
- Released: March 21, 2022
- Recorded: 2022
- Genre: K-pop
- Length: 2:44
- Label: Atlantic
- Songwriters: Albin Nordqvist; Andreas Carlsson; Bekuh Boom; Ellen Berg; Cazzi Opeia
- Producer: Albin Nordqvist

AleXa singles chronology
"Tattoo" (2022)	"Wonderland" (2022)	"Back in Vogue" (2022)

Performance video
- "Wonderland" on YouTube

"Wonderland" is a song by Korean-American singer AleXa. It was released on March 21, 2022, by Atlantic Records and was written by Andreas Carlsson, Bekuh Boom, Ellen Berg, and Cazzi Opeia, as well as Albin Nordqvist who produced the song. The single became available to pre-save on March 19, 2022.

The single represented the state Oklahoma in the only competition of American Song Contest, where it won first place. After the complete line-up of songs was announced, "Wonderland" was the bookmakers' favorite to win the competition because of the anticipation of a K-pop artist participating in an American contest, and remained so until the end of the contest. As part of AleXa's reward for winning, she was slated to perform at the 2022 Billboard Music Awards on May 15, 2022, becoming the second K-pop artist to do so, after BTS. AleXa, however, only presented at the award ceremony. iHeartRadio also pledged to play her winning song all summer.

== Background ==
American Song Contest, which premiered March 21, 2022, was hosted by Kelly Clarkson and Snoop Dogg. Contestants representing the 50 states, Washington, D.C., and five US territories performed original songs in the qualifying rounds, and a combination of jury ranking and audience voting determined the artists which would advance to the semi-finals and the finals. It is a counterpart of Eurovision Song Contest, which is also organized by EBU. The grand finale took place on May 10, 2022, and AleXa became the first winner of American Song Contest. She earned 656 points in the televote and secured the top spot with 710 points in total.

== Composition ==
"Wonderland" is a dance-pop song that contains a message about "perfect love that exists only in imagination and not in reality". The song was written by Albin Nordqvist, Andreas Carlsson, Bekuh Boom, Ellen Berg, and Cazzi Opeia. "Wonderland" was composed in the key of F minor, with a tempo of 100 beats per minute. Choreography was provided by Ryan Ramirez and House of Sam (HOS). The song's lyrics contain Alice in Wonderland allusions and the stage performance took place on a checkered floor with "trippy" imagery and choreography.

Throughout the competition, AleXa performed "Wonderland" in a series of elaborate outfits (with the finale performance being the Red Queen's theme), with colorful stage productions and intricate choreography. In all three performances, AleXa fell from the top of a staircase.

== Promotions ==
AleXa appeared on Simply K-Pop on April 4, 2022. A performance video was released on her official channel, and she also appeared on Mnet Digital Studio (M2) & Studio Choom.

== Track listing ==
- Digital download / streaming – Original
1. "Wonderland" – 2:44
- Digital download / streaming – (Korean version)
1. "Wonderland" – 2:44
- Digital download / streaming – Remixes
1. "Wonderland" (Stripped remix) – 2:33
2. "Wonderland" (Nevada remix) – 3:02

== Credits and personnel ==
Credits adopted from Genius.

- Albin Nordqvist – production, writing
- Bekuh Boom – writing
- Andreas Carlsson – writing
- Ellen Berg – writing
- Cazzi Opeia – writing
- Sonnet – recording
- Jeremie Inhaber – mixing
- Daniel Rowland – mastering
- Ryan Ramirez – choreography
- House of Sam (HOS) – choreography

== Charts ==
Chart performance for "Wonderland"
Chart (2022)	Peak position
US Mainstream Top 40 (Billboard)	38

== Release history ==
Release history for "Wonderland"
Region	Date	Format	Label	Ref.
Various	March 21, 2022	Digital download; streaming	Atlantic	
