= Tenelle =

American singer-songwriter

- Born: Tenelle Christine Luafalemana; July 21, 1988 (age 38)
- Origin: Carson, California
- Genres: Reggae, R&B, Pop
- Occupation: Singer-songwriter

Tenelle Christine Luafalemana (born July 21, 1988) is an American Samoan singer-songwriter from Carson, California. She represented American Samoa in the American Song Contest where she placed 6th in the Grand Final.

== Early life ==
Tenelle grew up in Carson, California where she was originally a softball player. At the age of 12, she started taking singing lessons with vocal coach Tim Carter, best known for his work with artists such as Beyoncé and Willow Smith. After graduating from Gardena High School in 2006, Tenelle joined three of her uncles in a band called Chord Brown.

== Career ==
Tenelle started her solo career as a popular regional performer on the West Coast of the United States and in Oceania. She became internationally recognized after the release of her single "Flava" by Grammy nominated artist Meghan Trainor in 2013. The song quickly rose on the iTunes singles chart, even reaching the number 1 spot. Tenelle's 2014 single "Get Some" was the most requested song on Honolulu's contemporary hits station, KCCN-FM. Her debut album For the Lovers was released on 10 March 2017 and peaked at number 1 on the Billboard Reggae Albums chart.

Tenelle has performed and collaborated with fellow Pacific Islander artists such as George 'Fiji' Veikoso, Drew Deezy, Adeaze, Anuhea, and Kimie. She has toured in the Northern Mariana Islands, Guam, Australia, New Zealand, Japan, American Samoa, and Samoa.

== Discography ==
=== Albums ===
Title	Album details	Peak chart positions
Title	Album details	Reggae
For the Lovers	Release date: 10 March 2017; Label: Island Empire Records	1
This Is X	Release date: 17 July 2020; Label: Ten Ent	-
Anything Is Possible	Release date: 22 January 2021; Label: Ten Ent	-
HOME	Release date: 18 July 2025; Label: Ten Ent	-

=== Singles ===
- "Flava" (2013)
- "Tell Me" (2013)
- "Get Some" (2014)
- "Number One" (2015)
- "All I Want Is You" (2016)
- "Girl Like Me" (2016)
- "Ride or Die" (2016)
- "Say That You Love Me" (2016)
- "Girl Like Me" (2016)
- "Front Door" (2018)
