= For Love (album) =

Studio album by Anuhea
- Released: February 14, 2012
- Genre: Pop, reggae, R&B
- Label: Worldsound

Anuhea chronology
Anuhea (2009)	For Love (2012)	Butterflies: Anuhea Live (2013)

Professional ratings
Review scores
Source	Rating
Allmusic	3.5/5 stars

For Love is the second album by Hawaiian singer Anuhea, released on February 12, 2012.

== Track listing ==
1. "Looking for Love" – 3:21
2. "Higher Than the Clouds" – 3:43
3. "Simple Love Song" – 3:44
4. "Mr. Mellow" – 3:32
5. "Moving On" – 3:36
6. "I Wanna Be There" – 4:08
7. "Fight for Me Tonight" – 3:38
8. "It's Not the Same" – 3:12
9. "No Time" – 3:33
10. "Come Over Love" – 4:05
11. "Crown Royal" – 3:58
12. "What Am I Doing? - 3:52
13. "Sunday" – 4:23
14. "Issues" -
