= American Song Contest =

American music competition series

- Genre: Music competition
- Created by: European Broadcasting Union
- Based on: Eurovision Song Contest
- Directed by: Ivan Dudynsky; Robin Hofwander
- Presented by: Snoop Dogg; Kelly Clarkson
- Country of origin: United States
- Original language: English
- No. of seasons: 1
- No. of episodes: 8

Production
- Executive producers: Ben Silverman; Howard T. Owens; Audrey Morrissey; Anders Lenhoff; Brittany Martin Porter; Christer Björkman; Peter Settman; Ola Melzig; Gregory Lipstone; Snoop Dogg; Kelly Clarkson
- Production locations: NBCUniversal Lot, Universal City, California
- Cinematography: Erik Rubner
- Running time: 86 minutes
- Production companies: Voxovation, Inc.; American Song Contest, Inc.; Universal Television Alternative Studio; Propagate Content

Original release
- Network: NBC
- Release: March 21 – May 9, 2022

The American Song Contest is a one-off American music reality competition television series based on the Eurovision Song Contest. Hosted by Snoop Dogg and Kelly Clarkson, it consists of eight episodes airing between March 21 and May 9, 2022 on NBC. The series sees acts representing all fifty U.S. states, five territories, as well as Washington, D.C. compete for the title of Best Original Song. 56 competing entries were divided into five qualifying rounds leading to two 11-participant semi-finals, and culminating with a 10-participant final round. Participants advanced from a qualifying round to a semi-final, and then to a final based on votes received by public voting or jury voting, or a combination thereof.

NBC acquired the rights to broadcast the Eurovision Song Contest in the United States starting in 2021 and shortly after announced the American Song Contest with a 2022 premiere date. Promotion for the series was organized by NBC and included a commercial during the 2022 Super Bowl and a sweepstakes for listeners on iHeartRadio stations. The winner was the state of Oklahoma, represented by AleXa with the song "Wonderland". Reception for the series was largely mixed, with many critics noting that it did not live up to its Eurovision inspiration; it was ultimately not renewed for a 2023 season.

== Format ==
The American Song Contest put artists head-to-head against other representatives in a series of qualifying rounds, leading to the semi-finals and a prime time final in a "March Madness" style. The winning act earned the title of Best Original Song. As initially announced in August 2020, the competition would feature professional musical artists such as solo singers, duos, or groups of up to six members from each of the 50 U.S. states. By May 2021, the format had been expanded to include all five populated U.S. territories and the nation's capital and federal district of Washington, D.C. The participating territories were American Samoa, Guam, Northern Mariana Islands, Puerto Rico, and the U.S. Virgin Islands. Acts could consist of solo artists, duos, bands, or a DJ.

Each representative performed an original song in the live television program broadcast across the country on NBC. The series lasted eight episodes, consisting of five episodes of qualifying rounds, followed by two episodes of semi-finals and one final. In each qualifying round, a 56-member jury of music industry professionals (one for each state and territory) selected one song to advance to the semi-finals, while three songs also advanced after a 35-hour viewer voting period, which tallied votes from a combination of the jury and fans. After the qualifying rounds, the jury also selected two "redemption songs" from the qualifying rounds to join in the semi-finals, bringing the total number of semi-finalists to 22. They were then divided into two 11-participant semi-finals. The same selection process was facilitated in the semi-finals to determine the 10 acts to compete in the final. The final results were presented in Eurovision style, with each jury member awarding their maximum 12 points, followed by the awarding of points from viewers. The viewer votes were weighted, with each state and territory being worth 12 points much like in Eurovision, thus giving all regions equal voting power while preventing populous states like California and Texas from dominating the voting process.

== Production ==
=== Background ===
The Eurovision Song Contest is an international song competition organized annually by the European Broadcasting Union (EBU) since 1956, which features participants representing primarily European countries. It ranks among the world's most-watched non-sporting events every year, with hundreds of millions of viewers globally. The earliest known telecast of Eurovision in the continental US was in 1971, while the 1969 contest's broadcast in Puerto Rico was the first for a U.S. territory. The contest was later broadcast in both areas for the 2003 and 2004 contests. U.S. cable network Logo TV broadcast the finals from 2016 to 2018, featuring commentary from Carson Kressley and Michelle Collins (2016); Michelle Visage and Ross Mathews (2017); and Mathews and Shangela (2018). Viewing figures were low, ranging from 52,000 viewers in 2016 to 74,000 viewers in 2018. WJFD-FM, a commercial radio station in New Bedford, Massachusetts, also broadcast the 2018 and 2019 finals, with English and Portuguese commentary.

Netflix licensed the video-on-demand rights for the 2019 and 2020 contests. The OTT platform planned to release the musical comedy film Eurovision Song Contest: The Story of Fire Saga together with the 2020 contest. However, because of the contest's cancellation due to the COVID-19 pandemic, the film was released a month later, on June 26. The film became the most-streamed content on Netflix in the U.S. on its first weekend, and introduced American viewers to the Eurovision format and its popularity in Europe. Furthermore, a song from the film, "Husavik", was later nominated for the Academy Award for Best Original Song at the 93rd Academy Awards.

There were plans to develop an American adaptation of Eurovision as early as 2006, with Ben Silverman, then-chairman of production company Reveille, developing the contest for NBC to challenge American Idol. Silverman, who is currently co-CEO and chairman of production company Propagate, admitted in 2020 that he had been trying to pursue this project for 20 years, including during his tenure as chairman of NBC.

=== Development ===
In an interview with Billboard, Christer Björkman and Anders Lenhoff revealed that they discussed creating an American version of the Eurovision Song Contest after producing the 2017 competition in Kyiv, Ukraine. Lenhoff brought up the idea, to which Björkman was hesitant, saying: "Why would we do that and how would that work?" Despite the initial rejection, Lenhoff persisted with the concept, adding: "It sounds like a brilliant idea with states competing instead of countries. Americans love music. Americans love competition. Americans love where they come from. They have an awesome amount of pride for their home state, for their hometown." Lenhoff then contacted fellow Swedish producer Peter Settman, who crafted the business plan for potential sponsors and TV networks. After announcing in 2019 that they have acquired the rights from the EBU to produce an American version of Eurovision, Björkman and his team received a call from Silverman saying, "You are not doing this without me. Period. That's not going to happen."

When America is more factionalized than ever and we are dealing with so many issues that divide us, the one (thing) that truly unites us is our culture. (The American Song Contest) can unite it by celebrating its diversity, its distinctions, and in pulling everyone around its love of music and its love of song.

— Ben Silverman, executive producer, speaking to NME.com

The European Broadcasting Union announced NBC had acquired the rights to broadcast the competition on May 14, 2021. NBC announced the American Song Contest would have a mid-season or summer premiere in 2022 after releasing their fall schedule for the upcoming 2021–22 network television season. The producers were able to get NBC on board mainly due to their experience working with music shows such as The Voice and Songland. Silverman serves as executive producer for the program, while Audrey Morrissey is appointed as the showrunner. Propagate Content and Universal Television Alternative Studio serve as the production companies for the program. In a press statement, Silverman hoped that focusing on the mutual love and respect for music would unite a "fractional America." Deadline Hollywood reported that a corporation that centers around the competition has been founded, with former Propagate president Greg Lipstone appointed as President and Chief Operating Officer. The American Song Contest, Inc., aims to "develop and grow the Eurovision brand globally," which includes creating auxiliary businesses around the reality series, as well as expanding the franchise to countries that are not covered by Eurovision.

NBC originally scheduled the premiere for February 21, 2022, but the premiere was postponed in favor of America's Got Talent: Extreme due to COVID-19-related concerns involving the Omicron variant. The first live show was finally broadcast on March 21, with the finale moved to May 9, the same week as the Eurovision Song Contest 2022.

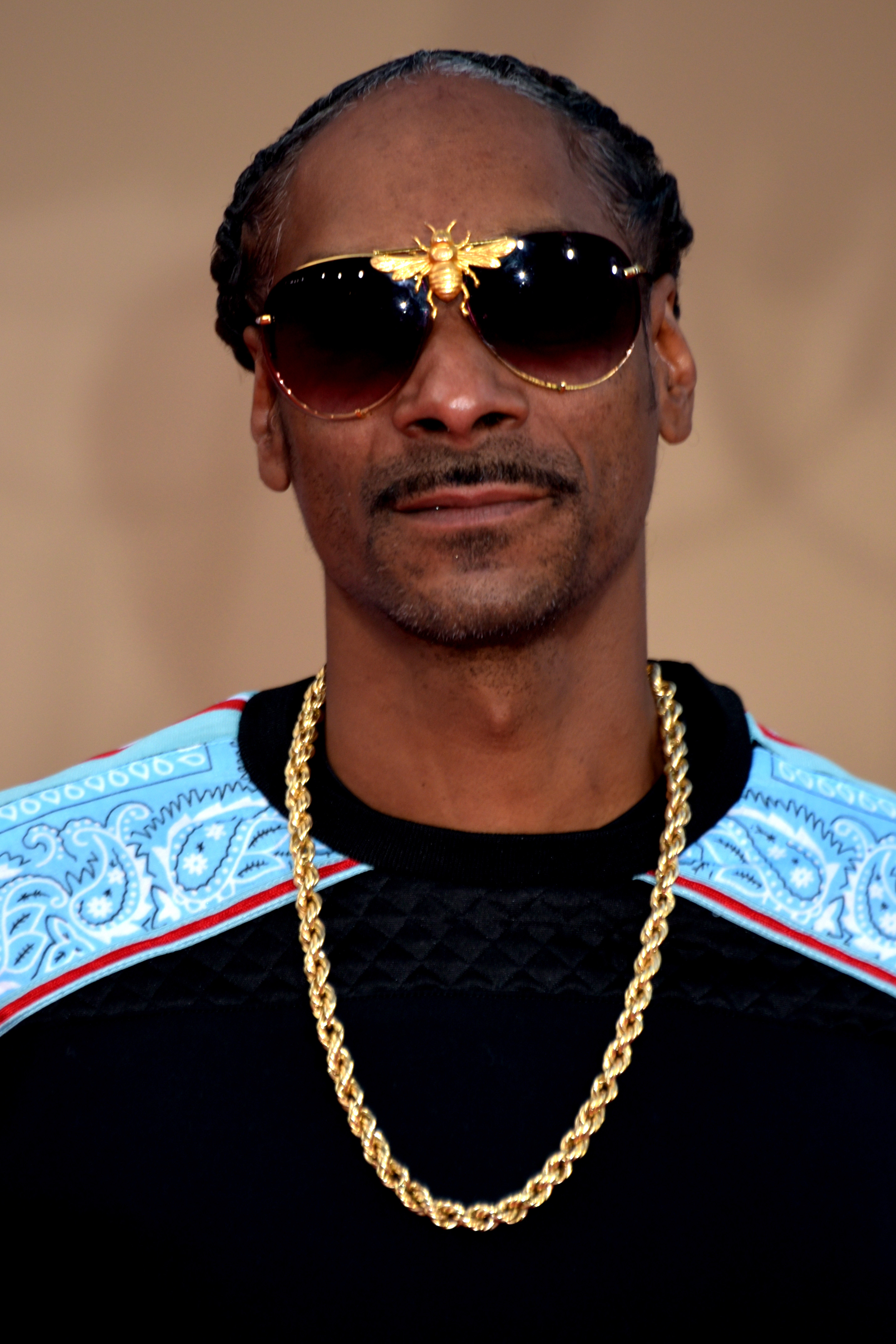
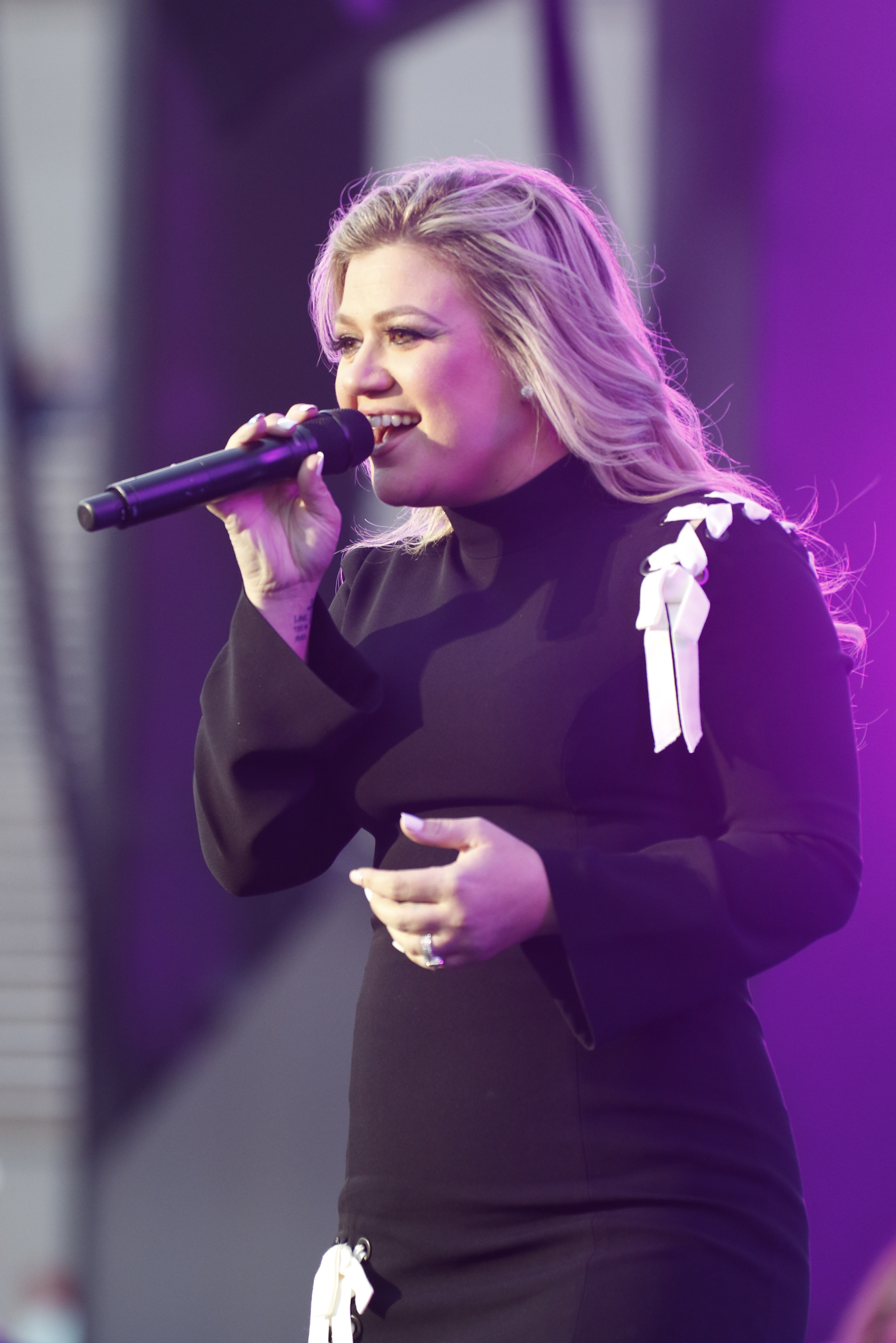
Snoop Dogg (left) and Kelly Clarkson were introduced as presenters of the American Song Contest during the show's advertisement at the start of the Super Bowl LVI halftime show.

Rapper Snoop Dogg and pop singer Kelly Clarkson were introduced as presenters of the show. In a statement, Clarkson said: "I have been a fan and love the concept of Eurovision and am thrilled to bring the musical phenomenon to America. I'm so excited to work with Snoop and can't wait to see every state and territory represented by artists singing their own songs." Clarkson added during a virtual press conference: "We are so unfortunately divided... and having so many things going on – it's been a very hard couple of years and now it's getting more serious. Feeling like you are not isolated and that you are a part of something bigger than your everyday world is so important. That's what this show is going to do for people. Everyone is being represented. It's a really great concept in general but one that is very needed right now."

== Participants ==
An online submissions platform was launched in May 2021, allowing eligible artists aged 16 years and older to apply, with or without recording or publishing deals. Participants were required to list all states or territories with which they had "an authentic, deep connection" during the casting process, with the producers having the final say on which state or territory the artists would represent. The website stressed that submissions had to be original songs in any genre and could not have been released commercially. Songs that were released promotionally, such as on SoundCloud and on social media, could be submitted—given that all posts were to be deleted if selected. The producers teased the possibility of filming in Los Angeles or Atlanta between February and April 2022. However, filming was later confirmed to take place on the Universal Studios Lot in Universal City, California. Previously, Björkman had stated during an interview in The Euro Trip podcast that Las Vegas, Tampa, and Orlando were also considered to be the first host city.

NBC revealed the 56 competing artists on March 3, 2022, through an interactive map. Atlantic Records served as the exclusive music partner of the American Song Contest, with the original songs in the competition released in batches beginning March 21 at midnight Eastern Daylight Time.

Participants
State/Territory	Artist	Song	Songwriter(s)
Alabama	Ni/Co	"The Difference"	Andreas Carlsson, Colton Jones, Danielle Brillhart, Gaby Feldman, Kevin Hutchens
Alaska	Jewel	"The Story"	Jewel Kilcher, Johan Carlsson, Ross Golan
American Samoa	Tenelle	"Full Circle"	Ali Dee Theodore, Anthony Mirabella III, Benjamin Briggs, Bianca Sperduti, Kerry Clisby, Nikki Sorentino, Sergio Cabral, Susan Paroff, Tenelle Luafalemana, Trent Foisia
Arizona	Las Marías	"De La Finikera"	Eduardo Meza
Arkansas	Kelsey Lamb	"Never Like This"	Carly Pearce, Casey Brown, Parker Welling
California	Sweet Taboo	"Keys to the Kingdom"	Breanne Santana, Gian Stone, Jennifer Torrejon, Madison Love, Richard Vission, Samantha Ramos, Sean Douglas
Colorado	Riker Lynch	"Feel the Love"	Andreas Carlsson, Desmond Child, Jimmy Jansson, Vera Hotsauce
Connecticut	Michael Bolton	"Beautiful World"	Justin Jesso, Michael Bolton
Delaware	Nitro Nitra	"Train"	Ali Dee Theodore, Anthony Mirabella III, Auanitra Aiken, Bianca Sperduti, James A. Pollard Jr.
Florida	Ale Zabala	"Flirt"	Alexa Zabala, Andreas Carlsson, Melanie Joy Fontana, Michel Schulz
Georgia	Stela Cole	"DIY"	Hollyn Shadinger, Mark Evans, Stephen Harry Dunkley, Steven Cheung
Guam	Jason J.	"Midnight"	Chaz Mark Toney, Jason Niel Jabinigay
Hawaii	Bronson Varde	"4 You"	Ali Dee Theodore, Anthony Mirabella III, Bianca Sperduti, Bronson Varde, Nikki Sorentino, Sergio Cabral, Susan Paroff
Idaho	Andrew Sheppard	"Steady Machine"	Andrew Sheppard
Illinois	Justin Jesso	"Lifeline"	Devin Kennedy, Justin Jesso, Lukas Kostas
Indiana	UG skywalkin (ft. Maxie)	"Love in My City"	Albert Sprears, Antonio Maxie, Josh Phillip Kimbowa, Theophilus Akai
Iowa	Alisabeth Von Presley	"Wonder"	Ali Dee Theodore, Alisabeth Von Presley, Anthony Mirabella III, Timothy James King
Kansas	Broderick Jones (ft. Calio)	"Tell Me"	Broderick Jones, Callan Searcy
Kentucky	Jordan Smith	"Sparrow"	Andreas Carlsson, Desmond Child, Jordan Smith
Louisiana	Brittany Pfantz	"Now You Do"	Brittany Pfantz, Ryan Corn
Maine	King Kyote	"Get Out Alive"	Darren Elder, Jonathan King, Jonathan Wyman, Joseph Mahoney
Maryland	Sisqó	"It's Up"	Mark Althavan Andrews, Nathan L. Mooring
Massachusetts	Jared Lee	"Shameless"	Carly Paige, Dan Whittemore, Diamond Karruen White Long, Jared Lee
Michigan	Ada LeAnn	"Natalie"	Ada LeAnn Compton, Carter Jon Frodge
Minnesota	Yam Haus	"Ready to Go"	Lawrence Lane Pruitt, Simon Oscroft, Zachary Kurt Beinlich
Mississippi	Keyone Starr	"Fire"	Ali Dee Theodore, Anthony Mirabella III, Bianca Sperduti, John Emanuel Morris, Lakreshia Keyone Edwards, Sergio Cabral
Missouri	Halie	"Better Things"	Alex Angelo, Blake Densmore, Halie Wooldridge
Montana	Jonah Prill	"Fire It Up"	Jared Mullins, Jordan Schmidt, Seth Ennis
Nebraska	Jocelyn	"Never Alone"	Danelle Joy Leverett Reeves, Jason Bradford Reeves, Jocelyn Anderson
Nevada	The Crystal Method (feat. Koda and VAAAL)	"Watch Me Now"	David Mårtensson, Jordan David Sudak, Scott Kirkland
New Hampshire	MARi	"Fly"	Ali Dee Theodore, Andreas Carlsson, Anthony Mirabella III, Bianca Sperduti, David Mullen, Ian Anthony Osborne, Mari Burelle-Valencia, Scott Callaway
New Jersey	Brooke Alexx	"I Don't Take Pictures Anymore"	Autumn Buysse, Brandon Meagher, Brooke Alexandria Greenberg
New Mexico	Khalisol	"Drop"	Geoffrey McCray, Kaelin Ellis, Zachary Chicoine
New York	Enisa	"Green Light"	Cameron Warren, Enisa Nikaj
North Carolina	John Morgan	"Right in the Middle"	John Morgan, Justin Wilson, Rodney Clawson, Will Bundy
North Dakota	Chloe Fredericks	"Can't Make You Love Me"	Chloe Fredericks, Melissa Carter, Rob Nagelhout
Northern Mariana Islands	Sabyu	"Sunsets and Seaturtles"	Chris Mena, Gerson Zaragoza, Matthew Sablan, Mike Kohfeld, Skúli Gestsson
Ohio	Macy Gray (ft. The California Jet Club and Maino)	"Every Night"	Alex Kyhn, Billy Wes, Christopher Dotson, Jamal Rashid, Jermaine Coleman, Natalie Hinds, Tamir Barzilay, Thomas Lumpkin
Oklahoma	AleXa	"Wonderland"	Albin Nordqvist, Andreas Carlsson, Bekuh Boom, Ellen Berg, Moa Carlebecker
Oregon	courtship.	"Million Dollar Smoothies"	Eli Rueben Hirsch, Micah Ross Gordon
Pennsylvania	Bri Steves	"Plenty Love"	Avery Earls, Brandon Hodge, Brianna Ashleigh Stevenson, Darryl Pearson, Donnie Meadows, Kristal Oliver, Larrance Dopson, Quintin Gulledge
Puerto Rico	Christian Pagán	"Loko"	Bileidy Hernandez, Christian Pagán, Desmond Child, Emilio Amaya Acosta, Faisal Ben Said, Jodi Marr, Markus Sepehrmanesh, Samuel Kvist, Timothy Caifeldt
Rhode Island	Hueston	"Held On Too Long"	Cory Hueston
South Carolina	Jesse LeProtti	"Not Alone"	Ali Dee Theodore, Andreas Carlsson, Anthony Mirabella III, Bianca Sperduti, Jesse Leprotti
South Dakota	Judd Hoos	"Bad Girl"	Adam Dennis Agin, Andrew Arthur Young, Denham Issac McDermott
Tennessee	Tyler Braden	"Seventeen"	Tyler Braden
Texas	Grant Knoche	"Mr. Independent"	Grant Christian Knoche, John Arnell Newsome
U.S. Virgin Islands	Cruz Rock	"Celebrando"	Ali Dee Theodore, Anthony Mirabella III, Bianca Sperduti, Errol Ajani Williams, Frankie Garcia, Sergio Cabral
Utah	Savannah Keyes	"Sad Girl"	Blair Daly, Heather Morgan, Savannah Keyes
Vermont	Josh Panda	"Rollercoaster"	Clinton Lewis Bierman, Joshua Pender, Peter Whitfield Day
Virginia	Almira Zaky	"Over You"	Almira Zaky
Washington	Allen Stone	"A Bit of Both"	Allen Stone, Tyler Acord
Washington, D.C.	Nëither	"I Like It"	Marcus R. Neither
West Virginia	Alexis Cunningham	"Working on a Miracle"	Alexis Paige Cunningham, Eric Bazilian, Martin Štibernik
Wisconsin	Jake'O	"Feel Your Love"	Ali Dee Theodore, Anthony Mirabella III, Bianca Sperduti, Jacob Brendan McCluskey
Wyoming	Ryan Charles	"New Boot Goofin'"	Khadi Clamoungou, Ryan Charles Kinzer

== Qualifying rounds ==
In each qualifying round, 11-12 songs competed for four spots in the semi-final, with the outcome decided upon by the votes from a jury panel and a public vote. An automatic qualifier from each round was determined by the juries, while the remaining three spots were decided by a combination of the jury and public votes. Moreover, two artists with the highest streams to this point returned as "redemption picks" and would join the qualifiers in the semi-finals.

=== Qualifiers 1 ===
The first qualifier round was held on Monday, March 21. At the end of the broadcast, it was announced that the jury had selected Rhode Island to advance to the semi-final. On April 18, it was announced on The Kelly Clarkson Show that Wyoming had advanced to the semi-final, being the first redemption pick.

Jury qualifier Combined qualifier Redemption

R/O	State/Territory	Artist	Song	Jury
1	Minnesota	Yam Haus	"Ready to Go"	7
2	Oklahoma	AleXa	"Wonderland"	2
3	Arkansas	Kelsey Lamb	"Never Like This"	3
4	Indiana	UG skywalkin	"Love in My City"	11
5	Puerto Rico	Christian Pagán	"Loko"	4
6	Connecticut	Michael Bolton	"Beautiful World"	5
7	Iowa	Alisabeth Von Presley	"Wonder"	8
8	Wisconsin	Jake'O	"Feel Your Love"	9
9	Mississippi	Keyone Starr	"Fire"	6
10	Wyoming	Ryan Charles	"New Boot Goofin' "	10
11	Rhode Island	Hueston	"Held On Too Long"	1

=== Qualifiers 2 ===
The second qualifier round was held on Monday, March 28. At the end of the broadcast, it was announced that the jury had selected Kentucky to advance to the semi-final. During the first semi-final, it was announced that New York had advanced to the semi-final, being the second redemption pick.

Jury qualifier Combined qualifier Redemption

R/O	State/Territory	Artist	Song	Jury
1	Oregon	courtship.	"Million Dollar Smoothies"	11
2	Montana	Jonah Prill	"Fire It Up"	3
3	New York	Enisa	"Green Light"	9
4	Nebraska	Jocelyn	"Never Alone"	7
5	U.S. Virgin Islands	Cruz Rock	"Celebrando"	10
6	Kentucky	Jordan Smith	"Sparrow"	1
7	North Dakota	Chloe Fredericks	"Can't Make You Love Me"	5
8	Kansas	Broderick Jones	"Tell Me"	2
9	Virginia	Almira Zaky	"Over You"	8
10	Maine	King Kyote	"Get Out Alive"	4
11	Ohio	Macy Gray	"Every Night"	6

=== Qualifiers 3 ===
The third qualifier round was held on Monday, April 4. At the end of the broadcast, it was announced that the jury had selected Tennessee to advance to the semi-final. The final results of this qualifying round was announced on the fourth episode of the contest.

Jury qualifier Combined qualifier

R/O	State/Territory	Artist	Song	Jury	Place
1	Texas	Grant Knoche	"Mr. Independent"	4	4
2	Louisiana	Brittany Pfantz	"Now You Do"	8	9
3	Tennessee	Tyler Braden	"Seventeen"	1	1
4	New Jersey	Brooke Alexx	"I Don't Take Pictures Anymore"	5	7
5	Alabama	Ni/Co	"The Difference"	3	3
6	Florida	Ale Zabala	"Flirt"	2	6
7	Alaska	Jewel	"The Story"	9	5
8	South Carolina	Jesse LeProtti	"Not Alone"	12	12
9	South Dakota	Judd Hoos	"Bad Girl"	11	11
10	Delaware	Nitro Nitra	"Train"	7	8
11	Northern Mariana Islands	Sabyu	"Sunsets and Seaturtles"	10	10
12	Colorado	Riker Lynch	"Feel the Love"	6	2

=== Qualifiers 4 ===
The fourth qualifier round was held on Monday, April 11. At the end of the broadcast, it was announced that the jury had selected Washington to advance to the semi-final.

Jury qualifier Combined qualifier

R/O	State/Territory	Artist	Song	Jury
1	New Hampshire	Mari	"Fly"	8
2	Nevada	The Crystal Method	"Watch Me Now"	3
3	Utah	Savannah Keyes	"Sad Girl"	7
4	Washington, D.C.	Nëither	"I Like It"	11
5	Massachusetts	Jared Lee	"Shameless"	2
6	Georgia	Stela Cole	"DIY"	6
7	Hawaii	Bronson Varde	"4 You"	9
8	West Virginia	Alexis Cunningham	"Working on a Miracle"	5
9	Arizona	Las Marías	"De La Finikera"	10
10	Pennsylvania	Bri Steves	"Plenty Love"	4
11	Washington	Allen Stone	"A Bit of Both"	1

=== Qualifiers 5 ===
The fifth qualifier round was held on Monday, April 18. At the end of the broadcast, it was announced that the jury had selected Michigan to advance to the semi-final.

Jury qualifier Combined qualifier

R/O	State/Territory	Artist	Song	Jury
1	Illinois	Justin Jesso	"Lifeline"	5
2	California	Sweet Taboo	"Keys to the Kingdom"	2
3	Idaho	Andrew Sheppard	"Steady Machine"	6
4	New Mexico	Khalisol	"Drop"	7
5	Missouri	Halie	"Better Things"	10
6	American Samoa	Tenelle	"Full Circle"	4
7	North Carolina	John Morgan	"Right in the Middle"	3
8	Vermont	Josh Panda	"Rollercoaster"	8
9	Guam	Jason J.	"Midnight"	11
10	Michigan	Ada LeAnn	"Natalie"	1
11	Maryland	Sisqó	"It's Up"	9

== Semi-finals ==
The 22 semi-finalists were split into the two semi-finals that took place during the April 25 and May 2 episodes, respectively. In each semi-final, 11 songs competed for five spots in the grand final: an automatic qualifier from each semi-final was determined by the juries, while the remaining four spots were decided by the public votes. From both semi-finals combined, a total of ten performers would advance to the grand final on May 9.

=== Semi-final 1 ===
On April 19, NBC confirmed the first 11 semi-finalists who would compete in the first semi-final. The first semi-final was then held on Monday, April 25. At the end of the broadcast, it was announced that the jury had selected Washington to advance to the final. The public qualifiers for the final were announced at the beginning of the second semi-final, held the following week, and were Oklahoma, Colorado, Alabama, and Kentucky.

Jury qualifier Public vote qualifier

R/O	State/Territory	Artist	Song	Jury
1	Kentucky	Jordan Smith	"Sparrow"	2
2	Colorado	Riker Lynch	"Feel the Love"	11
3	New Hampshire	Mari	"Fly"	9
4	Washington	Allen Stone	"A Bit of Both"	1
5	Alabama	Ni/Co	"The Difference"	6
6	Wyoming	Ryan Charles	"New Boot Goofin'"	10
7	Rhode Island	Hueston	"Held On Too Long"	3
8	Montana	Jonah Prill	"Fire It Up"	7
9	Michigan	Ada LeAnn	"Natalie"	4
10	Massachusetts	Jared Lee	"Shameless"	8
11	Oklahoma	AleXa	"Wonderland"	5

=== Semi-final 2 ===
The second semi-final was held on Monday, May 2. At the end of the broadcast, it was announced that the jury had selected Tennessee to advance to the final. On Wednesday, May 4, it was announced on E! Network that the public qualifiers to the final were Connecticut, American Samoa, Texas, and North Dakota.

Jury qualifier Public vote qualifier

R/O	State/Territory	Artist	Song	Jury
1	Puerto Rico	Christian Pagán	"Loko"	7
2	North Carolina	John Morgan	"Right in the Middle"	4
3	Kansas	Broderick Jones	"Tell Me"	2
4	New York	Enisa	"Green Light"	11
5	North Dakota	Chloe Fredericks	"Can't Make You Love Me"	6
6	Connecticut	Michael Bolton	"Beautiful World"	5
7	Texas	Grant Knoche	"Mr. Independent"	8
8	California	Sweet Taboo	"Keys to the Kingdom"	3
9	Tennessee	Tyler Braden	"Seventeen"	1
10	Georgia	Stela Cole	"DIY"	9
11	American Samoa	Tenelle	"Full Circle"	10

== Grand final ==
The grand final took place on May 9 and served as the season finale of the series. Ten states and territories participated in the grand final, composed of the two jury qualifiers and the eight public vote qualifiers from the two semi-finals. The contest was won by the state of Oklahoma, represented by the song "Wonderland", performed by AleXa. As an interval act, Jimmie Allen performed his single "Down Home".

Finalists Eliminated in the semifinals Eliminated in the qualifier rounds

R/O	State/Territory	Artist	Song	Points	Place
1	Connecticut	Michael Bolton	"Beautiful World"	338	7
2	North Dakota	Chloe Fredericks	"Can't Make You Love Me"	267	9
3	Texas	Grant Knoche	"Mr. Independent"	366	4
4	Alabama	Ni/Co	"The Difference"	285	8
5	Kentucky	Jordan Smith	"Sparrow"	407	3
6	Washington (Note: During the show, it was announced that Allen Stone was not able to perform live due to personal reasons. Thus, he competed using a pre-recorded footage.)	Allen Stone	"A Bit of Both"	359	5
7	American Samoa	Tenelle	"Full Circle"	342	6
8	Oklahoma	AleXa	"Wonderland"	710	1
9	Tennessee	Tyler Braden	"Seventeen"	251	10
10	Colorado	Riker Lynch	"Feel the Love"	503	2

== Detailed voting results ==
Split results of the final
Place	Combined		Jury		Public	
Place	State/Territory	Points	State/Territory	Points	State/Territory	Points
1	Oklahoma	710	Washington	105	Oklahoma	654
2	Colorado	503	Tennessee	88	Colorado	478
3	Kentucky	407	Kentucky	79	Kentucky	328
4	Texas	366	Alabama	60	Texas	324
5	Washington	359	Oklahoma	56	American Samoa	305
6	American Samoa	342	North Dakota	48	Connecticut	298
7	Connecticut	338	Texas	42	Washington	254
8	Alabama	285	Connecticut	40	Alabama	225
9	North Dakota	267	American Samoa	37	North Dakota	219
10	Tennessee	251	Colorado	25	Tennessee	163

Voting results
Public vote Jury vote		Total score	Public score	Lower South	Mid Atlantic	Midwest	Mountains	New England	Pacific West	Plains	Southwest	Territories	Upper South
Contestants	Connecticut	338	298	6	7	1	6	1	2	1	2	7	7
Contestants	North Dakota	267	219	4	2	7	8	5	6	3	5	4	4
Contestants	Texas	366	324	3	4	10	5	3	1	5	6	3	2
Contestants	Alabama	285	225	7	3	6	4	6	10	12	4	5	3
Contestants	Kentucky	407	328	12	10	4	7	10	8	8	8	2	10
Contestants	Washington	359	254	10	12	12	12	12	12	7	12	10	6
Contestants	American Samoa	342	305	5	6	3	2	2	5	2	3	8	1
Contestants	Oklahoma	710	654	1	5	5	3	8	3	10	7	6	8
Contestants	Tennessee	251	163	8	8	8	10	7	7	6	10	12	12
Contestants	Colorado	503	478	2	1	2	1	4	4	4	1	1	5

=== 12 points ===
Below is a summary of the maximum 12 points awarded by each region's professional juries.

12 points awarded by juries
N.	Contestant	Region(s) giving 12 points
6	Washington	Mid Atlantic, Midwest, Mountains, New England, Pacific West, Southwest
2	Tennessee	Territories, Upper South
1	Alabama	Plains
1	Kentucky	Lower South

== National jury and spokespersons ==
=== National jury ===
The winner of the American Song Contest was partly determined by a 56-member "national jury," with one member representing each state and territory. Their duty was to evaluate each entry based on the live performance, together with its "artistic expression, hit potential, originality, and visual impression." They were then divided into ten regions, namely: Midwest, Upper South, New England, Plains, Mountains, Lower South, Mid-Atlantic, Southwest, Territories, and Pacific. Jurors include:

- Alabama – Amber Parker, program director, WTXT Tuscaloosa, iHeartMedia
- Alaska – Quinn Christopherson, singer-songwriter
- American Samoa – Joseph Fa'avae, founder, Island Block Network
- Arizona – Double-L, music director, on-air personality, KNIX Phoenix, iHeartMedia
- Arkansas – Kevin Mercer, program director, KHKN Little Rock, iHeartMedia
- California – Dan McCarroll, former president of Capitol Records and WB Records
- Colorado – Isaac Slade, frontman of The Fray
- Connecticut – Jaime Levine, CEO, Seven Mantels, artist manager
- Delaware – Christa Cooper, on-air personality / assistant program director, WDSD Wilmington, iHeartMedia
- Florida – Jose Tillan, director/producer – The POPGarage
- Georgia – Jennifer Goicoechea, SVP A&R Sony Music, EPIC
- Guam – Heidi Chargualaf Quenga, executive director, Chamorro Cultural Advisor
- Hawaii – Eric Daniels, keyboardist/arranger, The Voice
- Idaho – Shari Short, singer/songwriter/producer
- Illinois – Mike Knobloch, president, music and publishing, NBCUniversal
- Indiana – Nancy Yearing, talent development
- Iowa – Taylor J., program director / on-air personality KKDM Des Moines, iHeartMedia
- Kansas – Michelle Buckles, program director, KZCH Wichita, iHeartMedia
- Kentucky – Ashley Wilson, director of country programming, Kentucky/Indiana, iHeartMedia
- Louisiana – Uptown Angela, Executive Vice President of Programming, format lead custom R&B/gospel, iHeartMedia
- Maine – Lauren Wayne, general manager, talent buyer, State Theater
- Maryland – Caron Veazey, Founder & CEO, Something in Common
- Massachusetts – Jamie Cerreta, EVP Hipgnosis Songs Group
- Michigan – Shahida Mausi, CEO The Right Productions, Inc./Aretha Franklin Amphitheatre
- Minnesota – Barry Lather, creative director, choreographer, producer
- Mississippi – Joe King the Big Daddy, program director, WZLD Hattiesburg, iHeartMedia
- Missouri – Tommy Austin, SVP Programming, iHeartMedia
- Montana – Stephanie Davis, singer-songwriter
- Nebraska – Hoss Michaels, program director, KXKT Omaha, iHeartMedia
- Nevada – Jim Vellutato, CEO, Arrival Music
- New Hampshire – Charlie Singer, music television producer, executive producer
- New Jersey – Matt Pinfield, nationally syndicated radio host, A&R consultant, former MTV host of 120 Minutes
- New Mexico – Tony Manero, SVP Programming Southwest, iHeartMedia
- New York – Tom Poleman, Chief Programming Officer & President, iHeartMedia
- North Carolina – Paul Schadt, on-air personality, WKKT Charlotte, iHeartMedia
- North Dakota – Allison Bostow, program director / on-air personality, KIZZ Minot, iHeartMedia
- Northern Mariana Islands – Galvin Deleon Guerrero, President of Northern Marianas College, radio DJ
- Ohio – Khirye Tyler, songwriter, producer, musical director
- Oklahoma – Ester Dean, singer-songwriter
- Oregon – Mark Hamilton, program director / on-air personality, Portland Audacy
- Pennsylvania – Ty Stiklorius, Founder & CEO of Friends at Work
- Puerto Rico – Carlos Perez, creative director
- Rhode Island – Kristin Lessard, on-air personality, WSNE Providence, iHeartMedia
- South Carolina – Miss Monique, on-air personality / program director, WXBT Columbia, iHeartMedia
- South Dakota – Jered Johnson, President / CEO, Pepper Entertainment
- Tennessee – Brian Phillips, Executive VP, Content and Audience, Cumulus Media
- Texas – Natural, music producer
- U.S. Virgin Islands – Ajanie Williams, music producer & author
- Utah – Jeff McCartney, SVP Programming, Salt Lake City, iHeartMedia
- Vermont – Lee Chesnut, A&R Consultant
- Virginia – Justin Derrico, musician
- Washington – Zann Fredlund, on-air personality, music director & assistant program director, KBKS Seattle, iHeartMedia
- Washington, D.C. – Dustin Matthews, Director of Rock Programming, Washington, DC, iHeartMedia
- West Virginia – Judy Eaton, program director, WTCR Huntington, iHeartMedia
- Wisconsin – Shanna "Quinn" Cudeck, program director / on-air personality, WMIL Milwaukee, iHeartMedia
- Wyoming – Ian Munsick, Warner Music recording artist

=== Spokespersons ===
All 56 juries were geographically divided in the grand final and selected the following spokespersons who announced the 12-point score from their respective regional juries chronologically:

Region	Juries	Spokesperson
Midwest	Illinois, Indiana, Ohio, Michigan, Minnesota, Wisconsin	Yam Haus (MN)
Upper South	Kentucky, North Carolina, South Carolina, West Virginia, Virginia	Almira Zaky (VA)
New England	Connecticut, Maine, Massachusetts, New Hampshire, Rhode Island, Vermont	Jared Lee (MA)
Plains	Arkansas, Iowa, Kansas, Missouri, Nebraska, Oklahoma	Alisabeth Von Presley (IA)
Mountains	Colorado, Idaho, Montana, North Dakota, South Dakota, Wyoming	Ryan Charles (WY)
Lower South	Alabama, Florida, Georgia, Louisiana, Mississippi, Tennessee	Ale Zabala (FL)
Mid Atlantic	Delaware, Maryland, New Jersey, New York, Pennsylvania, Washington, D.C.	Nitro Nitra (DE)
Territories	American Samoa, Guam, Northern Mariana Islands, Puerto Rico, U.S. Virgin Islands	Jason J. (GU)
Southwest	Arizona, Nevada, New Mexico, Utah, Texas	Savannah Keyes (UT)
Pacific West	Alaska, California, Hawaii, Oregon, Washington	Bronson Varde (HI)

== Episodes ==
No.	Title	Original release date	Prod. code	U.S. viewers (millions)	Rating (18–49)
1	"The Live Qualifiers Premiere"	March 21, 2022	101	2.90	0.49
2	"The Live Qualifiers Part 2"	March 28, 2022	102	1.88	0.34
3	"The Live Qualifiers Part 3"	April 4, 2022	103	1.65	0.28
4	"The Live Qualifiers Part 4"	April 11, 2022	104	1.44	0.28
5	"The Live Qualifiers Part 5"	April 18, 2022	105	1.53	0.27
6	"The Live Semi-Finals Premiere"	April 25, 2022	106	1.44	0.27
7	"The Live Semi-Finals Part 2"	May 2, 2022	107	1.61	0.28
8	"The Live Grand Final"	May 9, 2022	108	2.04	0.33

== Marketing ==
NBC News produced a report promoting the casting process of the American Song Contest, which was then distributed to its affiliate stations across the U.S. and its territories. It featured an interview with supervising casting producer Michelle McNulty, stating that they were "looking for the next big hit single, like those anthem songs... that just get in your head and can't get them out." The Italian rock band Måneskin, winners of the Eurovision Song Contest 2021, performed during the Top 10 episode of The Voice season 21, in which host Carson Daly promoted the American Song Contest as "the U.S. version of Eurovision." NBC released a promotional video for the American Song Contest on their Twitter account on December 15, 2021, stating that it'll be "the biggest live music event America has ever seen", with songs from all genres competing. An advertisement that introduces Snoop Dogg and Clarkson as the show's presenters debuted before the Super Bowl LVI halftime show. Clarkson had previously performed a cover of "Arcade" by Dutch singer Duncan Laurence, the winning song of the Eurovision Song Contest 2019, at her talk show. Radio stations affiliated with iHeartRadio have introduced sweepstakes in relation to the American Song Contest to listeners for a chance to win gift cards.

== International broadcasting ==
The show was also broadcast in Australia, Canada, and multiple European countries:

- Australia – SBS Viceland
- Austria and Germany – ServusTV
- Canada – CHCH-DT
- Denmark – DR
- Estonia – TV3
- Finland – Yle TV2
- Greece – ERT
- Iceland – RÚV
- Lithuania – TV6
- Montenegro – RTCG
- Norway – NRK
- Portugal – RTP
- Serbia – RTS
- Slovenia – RTVSLO
- Spain – RTVE Play
- Sweden – SVT

== Reception ==
The concept of producing an American version of Eurovision was initially met with lukewarm reactions. Andy Kryza of Time Out wrote that the American Song Contest's biggest challenge is "the relative homogeneity of the American musical landscape," that its pop stars need to be paired with colorful performers like drag queens, wrecking crews, clowns, gospel singers, and the like. Justin Kirkland of Esquire predicted that the contest will be "a colossal nightmare," adding that Americans "lack the self-deprecation, campiness, and selfless energy to pull this off." Chris Murphy of Vulture.com pointed out that the television landscape in the United States is saturated with singing and talent competitions, adding that "no one's gonna write a song as catchy as 'Husavik'."

In an interview with BBC Breakfast in 2020, Cheryl Baker (member of the winning act in the 1981 Eurovision) opined that the competition will not translate well in the U.S., adding that the country "has got a long way to go to get the kitsch, the cheese, and the fun element" of the contest. Baker also suggested that the U.S. should bring a representative to Eurovision instead.

When asked about the possibility of competing in the American Song Contest, Flo Rida explained that it would be "a dream come true." The Florida-based rapper performed "Adrenalina" along with San Marino's representative Senhit at the Eurovision Song Contest 2021.

Writing for The Guardian, Adam Gabbatt was excited about "the mouth-watering prospect of seeing how politically and culturally opposed states rate the musical output of their rivals." Gabbatt explained how conservative viewers in Texas and liberal audiences in New York could express their mutual dislike for one another, or how voters might turn against Florida due to the anti-mask and vaccine-skeptic crusade of the state's current governor. Fellow The Guardian columnist Stuart Heritage described the list of participants as "breathtakingly starry," referring to artists who "already have their own Wikipedia page," which he took as a sign that the producers are "taking this thing seriously."

Reacting to the premiere episode, Kevin Fallon of The Daily Beast commented that it was a "big ole meh," while pointing out the performances of Oklahoma's AleXa and Puerto Rico's Christian Pagán as the highlights of the night. Fallon added that while Wyoming's entry "New Boot Goofin'" was "undeniably the worst song of the night," he predicted that its irresistibility would become the show's "greatest success story." Emily Yahr of The Washington Post also wrote praises about "New Boot Goofin'", adding that it "immediately stole the show's social media thunder" and it could be "the song of the summer." Yahoo! Music's editor-in-chief Lyndsey Parker wrote that the first episode of the American Song Contest "failed to live up to Eurovision's wacky promise or premise."

== Cancellation and future ==
Björkman announced in early February 2023 that the series was not renewed for a 2023 season. Speaking to Swedish newspaper Aftonbladet, he added that he was disappointed in the way the program was organized, specifically the promotion of it and the lack of building awareness that the event was occurring. Following the event, only the winning song "Wonderland" by AleXa managed to place on the Billboard charts, with most remaining songs only gathering a few thousand streams each. In a press conference held during the Eurovision Song Contest 2023 in Liverpool, executive supervisor of Eurovision, Martin Österdahl, added that "partners in America are looking at other options." In March 2026, Österdahl's de facto successor, Eurovision director Martin Green, stated that the American Song Contest was not “"our format", and that "if you do only country (formats), it becomes The Voice or Idol".

== Awards and nominations ==
Year	Award	Category	Recipient(s)	Result	Ref.
2022	Primetime Creative Arts Emmy Awards	Outstanding Lighting Design / Lighting Direction for a Variety Series	Noah Mitz, William Gossett, Patrick Brazil, Rob Koenig, Matt Benson, Darien Koop, Matthew Cotter (Note: For "The Live Semi-Finals Premiere.")	Nominated	
