= Kidz Bop =

American children's music group

- Product type: Children's music
- Country: United States
- Introduced: October 9, 2001
- Markets: United States; United Kingdom; Germany; France; Mexico
- Tagline: Sung by Kids for Kids
- Website: kidzbop.com

Kidz Bop is an American children's music group that produces family-friendly covers of pop songs and related media. Kidz Bop releases compilation albums that feature children covering songs that chart high on the Billboard Hot 100 or receive heavy airplay from contemporary hit radio stations several months prior to each album's release. Their cover versions use substituted language for the original profanity.

== History ==
The concept for Kidz Bop was developed by Cliff Chenfeld and Craig Balsam, who had previously founded the entertainment company Razor & Tie. Chenfeld said Kidz Bop was intended to fill a gap between music for very young children and mainstream pop. The first album was released in 2001 and included updated versions of popular songs like NSYNC's "Bye Bye Bye" and "All the Small Things" by Blink-182.

Razor & Tie partnered with Concord in 2015 and was acquired outright by the company in 2018 who would later merge with BMG Rights Management. Chenfield and Balsam remained as co-CEOs through the transition before leaving the company.

In 2025, Kidz Bop released its 50th studio album.

== Chart performance ==
Kidz Bop has placed numerous releases on the Billboard 200 and the Billboard Kid Albums chart. In 2014, Kidz Bop 26 became the franchise's 40th album to chart on the Billboard 200. In November 2015, Billboard ranked Kidz Bop fourth among artists with the most top-ten albums in the history of the Billboard 200. At the time, the franchise had earned 22 top-ten albums. The group was later ranked number 75 on Billboard's decade-end list of the top artists of the 2010s. Kidz Bop 29 reached number three on the Billboard 200 in 2015. That year, the franchise recorded 1.15 million album-equivalent units, representing 23 percent of the children's music album category. In 2020, Spotify named Kidz Bop the most-streamed artist in the United States on its Spotify Kids app.

== Notable Kidz Bop alumni ==
- Fin Argus
- Becky G
- Kiana Brown
- Olivia Holt
- Elijah Johnson
- Grant Knoche
- Spencer Locke – Kidz Bop: Everyone's a Star (DVD)
- Ross Lynch
- Noah Munck
- Zendaya

== International expansion ==
=== United Kingdom ===
In February 2017, Kidz Bop announced it was launching outside the U.S. for the first time, expanding into the UK. There was a new lineup of British Kidz Bop Kids. Kidz Bop partnered with Universal Music Group, ITV, Crown Talent and Media Group and Creative Artists Agency for the UK launch, with ITV featuring the group in an episode of its star search programme The Big Audition.

The first two albums, Kidz Bop and Kidz Bop 2018, were released in the UK on March 31 and November 10, 2017, respectively. The third and fourth albums, Kidz Bop Summer '18 and Kidz Bop 2019, were released in the UK on March 23 and December 7, 2018, respectively. The fifth album, Kidz Bop 2020, was released in the UK on November 15, 2019. The sixth and seventh albums, Kidz Bop Party Playlist and Kidz Bop 2021, were released in the UK in June and October 2020, respectively. The eighth album, Kidz Bop All-Time Greatest Hits, was released in the UK on March 26, 2021. The ninth album, Kidz Bop 2022, was released in the UK on October 22, 2021.

=== Germany ===
Kidz Bop Germany and Kidz Bop Germany 2 were released in Germany on March 29 and September 6, 2019, respectively. The third and fourth albums, Kidz Bop Party Playlist! and Kidz Bop 2021, were released on April 3 and October 23, 2020, respectively. The fifth album, Kidz Bop All-Time Greatest Hits was released on March 26, 2021. The sixth album, Kidz Bop 2022, was released on October 22, 2021.

=== France ===
Kidz Bop 2022 was released in France on October 22, 2021, and was performed by the first lineup of French Kidz Bop Kids.

=== Mexico ===
Kidz Bop 2022 was released in Mexico on October 22, 2021, and was performed by the first lineup of Spanish-speaking Kidz Bop Kids.

== Live performances ==
In 2014, Kidz Bop launched the Dream Big, Sing Loud tour, a nationwide United States concert tour.

The touring program later expanded internationally. The Kidz Bop World Tour 2019 included performances in the United States, Canada, Australia, Germany, the United Kingdom and Mexico.

In 2024, Kidz Bop and Live Nation announced a three-year agreement to continue presenting annual North American tours.

In March 2025, Guinness World Records recognized Kidz Bop with the record for the youngest music performance ensemble to headline an arena. The record was presented during the group's concert at OVO Arena Wembley in London.

== Reception ==
Three months preceding the release of Kidz Bop 10 in 2006, the online tracklist was revealed to feature a cover of Fall Out Boy's "Dance, Dance". After finding out that Kidz Bop can use a song without the original artist's permission but needs their approval to change the lyrics, bassist Pete Wentz responded by requesting the removal of the cover due to the song's sexual overtones, to which Razor & Tie obliged and re-released the tracklist, eliminating "Dance, Dance".

A 2017 study on censorship in Kidz Bop found that replacing words and phrases in songs does not disassociate the original in the minds of young listeners who have heard the uncensored song, and that "repackaging adult music as kids' music" does not remove the adult themes even when words or phrases are substituted. Christopher Bell, an associate professor of media studies at the University of Colorado, has called Kidz Bop "an abomination" because it censors language but not content, altering specific words without changing or obscuring the underlying tone or meaning. He explained: "I don't need a sanitized version of 'Despacito' — I need 8-year-olds not to be singing 'Despacito' because that [song] is super dirty. And Kidz Bop doesn't always make that distinction."

In 2024, Kidz Bop was criticized by the LGBTQ media website Them for the reworked version of Chappell Roan's "Good Luck, Babe!". While the original song referenced Roan's closeted lesbian lover who is regretting her farce of a heterosexual marriage, the Kidz Bop cover version removed any hint of sexuality, replacing the words with confusing "out-of-left-field lyrical choices", according to Them. Members of the LGBTQ community have also criticized Kidz Bop for removing gay references in songs such as "Montero (Call Me by Your Name)" by Lil Nas X and "Born This Way" by Lady Gaga, the latter now delisted from streaming services. Many Americans with conservative political views have also criticized the brand for covering songs from these two artists.

== Albums ==
Album	Release date	Peak chart positions								Certifications (sales thresholds)	AllMusic review
Album	Release date	US Kids	US	AUS	AUT	CAN	GER	SWI	UK	Certifications (sales thresholds)	AllMusic review
Kidz Bop	October 9, 2001	1	76	—	—	—	—	—	7	US: Gold	
Kidz Bop 2	August 20, 2002	1	37	—	—	—	—	—	—	US: Gold	
Kidz Bop Christmas (2002)	October 22, 2002	—	66	—	—	—	—	—	—		
Kidz Bop 3	March 4, 2003	1	17	—	—	—	—	—	—	US: Gold	
Kidz Bop 4	August 12, 2003	1	14	—	—	—	—	—	—	US: Gold	
Kidz Bop 5	February 24, 2004	1	34	—	—	—	—	—	—		
Kidz Bop Gold	May 18, 2004	8	—	—	—	—	—	—	—		
Kidz Bop 6	August 10, 2004	1	23	—	—	—	—	—	—		
Kidz Bop Halloween	August 24, 2004	1	132	—	—	—	—	—	—		
Kidz Bop 7	February 22, 2005	1	7	—	—	—	—	—	—	US: Gold	
Kidz Bop 8	August 2, 2005	1	6	—	—	—	—	—	—	US: Gold	
A Very Merry Kidz Bop	September 27, 2005	3	128	—	—	—	—	—	—		
Kidz Bop 9	February 21, 2006	2	2	—	—	—	—	—	—	US: Gold	
More Kidz Bop Gold	May 23, 2006	5	176	—	—	—	—	—	—		
Kidz Bop 10	August 1, 2006	1	3	—	—	—	—	—	—	US: Gold	
Kidz Bop 11	February 20, 2007	1	4	—	—	—	—	—	—		
Kidz Bop Country	May 22, 2007	9	—	—	—	—	—	—	—		
Kidz Bop 12	July 31, 2007	2	7	—	—	—	—	—	—		
The Coolest Kidz Bop Christmas Ever!	September 25, 2007	5	57	—	—	—	—	—	—		
Kidz Bop 13	February 19, 2008	1	4	—	—	—	—	—	—		
Kidz Bop: 80s Gold	May 20, 2008	13	—	—	—	—	—	—	—		
Kidz Bop 14	July 29, 2008	1	8	—	—	—	—	—	—		
Kidz Bop 15	February 3, 2009	1	7	—	—	—	—	—	—		
Kidz Bop Greatest Hits	June 9, 2009	3	94	—	—	—	—	—	—		
Kidz Bop 16	August 4, 2009	1	8	—	—	—	—	—	—		
Kidz Bop Christmas	August 15, 2009	3	120	—	—	—	—	—	—		
Kidz Bop Sings The Beatles	November 10, 2009	1	173	—	—	—	—	—	—		
Kidz Bop 17	January 26, 2010	1	12	—	—	—	—	—	—		
Kidz Bop Dance Party!	May 3, 2010	3	—	—	—	—	—	—	—		
Kidz Bop 18	July 20, 2010	1	5	—	—	—	—	—	—	US: Gold	
Kidz Bop Halloween Party	August 24, 2010	2	67	—	—	—	—	—	—		
Kidz Bop Christmas Party	October 5, 2010	7	140	—	—	—	—	—	—		
Kidz Bop 19	January 18, 2011	1	2	—	—	—	—	—	—	US: Gold	
Kidz Bop Sings Monster Ballads	May 17, 2011	13	—	—	—	—	—	—	—		
Kidz Bop 20	July 19, 2011	1	2	—	—	—	—	—	—		
Kidz Bop Christmas (2011)	October 11, 2011	10	147	—	—	—	—	—	—		
Kidz Bop 21	January 17, 2012	1	2	—	—	18	—	—	—	US: Gold	
Kidz Bop Ultimate Hits	May 8, 2012	4	—	—	—	—	—	—	—		
Kidz Bop 22	July 17, 2012	1	3	—	—	—	—	—	—	US: Gold	
Kidz Bop Halloween Hits!	September 11, 2012	1	111	—	—	85	—	—	—		
Kidz Bop Christmas!	October 2, 2012	6	143	—	—	—	—	—	—		
Kidz Bop 23	January 15, 2013	1	2	—	—	23	—	—	—		
Kidz Bop Party Hits	May 14, 2013	1	108	—	—	—	—	—	—		
Kidz Bop 24	July 16, 2013	1	3	—	—	11	—	—	—		
Kidz Bop 25	January 14, 2014	1	3	—	—	18	—	—	—	US: Gold	
Kidz Bop Party Pop!	May 6, 2014	6	—	—	—	—	—	—	—		
Kidz Bop 26	July 15, 2014	1	4	—	—	—	—	—	—		
Kids Bop Christmas Wish List	November 4, 2014	6	—	—	—	—	—	—	—		
Kidz Bop 27	January 13, 2015	1	3	—	—	22	—	—	—	US: Gold	
Kidz Bop 28	March 23, 2015	1	10	—	—	—	—	—	—		
Kidz Bop 29	July 10, 2015	1	4	—	—	—	—	—	—		
Kidz Bop 30	October 16, 2015	1	12	—	—	—	—	—	—		
Kidz Bop 31	January 15, 2016	1	6	—	—	70	—	—	—		
Kidz Bop Greatest Hits!	April 1, 2016	2	—	—	—	—	—	—	—		
Kidz Bop Greatest Hits! (2016)	April 1, 2016	15	—	—	—	—	—	—	—		
Kidz Bop 32	July 15, 2016	1	9	—	—	63	—	—	—		
Kidz Bop Halloween (2016)	September 16, 2016	5	—	—	—	—	—	—	—		
Kidz Bop 33	October 14, 2016	1	30	—	—	—	—	—	—		
Kidz Bop Christmas (2016)	October 28, 2016	3	111	—	—	—	—	—	—		
Kidz Bop 34	January 20, 2017	1	18	—	—	—	—	—	—		
Kidz Bop 35	July 14, 2017	1	32	—	—	—	—	—	—		
Kidz Bop 36	October 13, 2017	1	119	—	—	—	—	—	—		
Kidz Bop 2018	November 10, 2017	—	—	—	—	—	—	—	25	UK: Silver	
Kidz Bop 37	January 19, 2018	1	16	—	—	—	—	—	—		
Kidz Bop Summer '18	March, 23 2018	—	—	—	—	—	—	—	8		
Kidz Bop 38	July 13, 2018	1	47	—	—	—	—	—	—		
Kidz Bop Christmas (2018)	September 14, 2018	2	—	—	—	—	—	—	—		
Kidz Bop 2019	December 7, 2018	—	—	50	—	—	—	—	26	UK: Silver	
Kidz Bop 39	January 18, 2019	1	53	—	—	—	—	—	—		
KIDZ BOP Germany	March 29, 2019	—	—	—	20	—	14	—	—		
Kidz Bop World Tour	May 24, 2019	2	—	—	—	—	—	—	—		
Kidz Bop Germany 2	September 6, 2019	—	—	—	—	—	36	—	—		
Kidz Bop 40	November 15, 2019	2	97	—	—	—	—	—	—		
Kidz Bop 2020	November, 15 2019	—	—	—	—	—	—	—	7	UK: Silver	
Kidz Bop Party Playlist	March 27, 2020	3	177	—	23	—	10	47	22	UK: Silver	
Kidz Bop Halloween Party!	September 4, 2020	4	—	—	—	—	—	—	—		
Kidz Bop Christmas Party!	September 25, 2020	3	—	—	—	—	—	—	—		
Kidz Bop 2021	October 23, 2020	1	—	—	29	—	20	—	27	UK: Silver	
Kidz Bop All-Time Greatest Hits	March 26, 2021	1	—	—	—	—	96	—	—		
Kidz Bop (20th Birthday Edition)	June 25, 2021	8	—	—	—	—	—	—	—		
Kidz Bop 2022	October 22, 2021	2	—	—	60	—	35	—	72		
Kidz Bop Ultimate Playlist	January 21, 2022	4	—	—	—	—	—	—	—		
Kidz Bop Super Pop!	July 15, 2022	6	—	—	—	—	—	—	—		
Kidz Bop Halloween (2022)	September 2, 2022	7	—	—	—	—	—	—	—		
Kidz Bop Christmas (2022)	November 4, 2022	15	—	—	—	—	—	—	—		
Kidz Bop 2023	January 20, 2023	1	—	—	—	—	—	—	—		
Kidz Bop 2023 Vol. 2	July 14, 2023	7	—	—	—	—	—	—	—		
Kidz Bop 2024	January 19, 2024	2	—	—	—	—	—	—	—		
Kidz Bop 2024 Vol. 2	July 12, 2024	3	—	—	—	—	—	—	—		
Kidz Bop BEST SONGS EVER	October 25, 2024	13	—	—	—	—	—	—	—		
Kidz Bop 50	January 17, 2025	25	—	—	—	—	—	—	—		
Kidz Bop 51	July 18, 2025	—	—	—	—	—	—	—	—		
Kidz Bop 52	January 9, 2026	—	—	—	—	—	—	—	—		
Kidz Bop 53	May 8, 2026	—	—	—	—	—	—	—	—		
Kidz Bop 54	August 14, 2026	—	—	—	—	—	—	—	—		

=== Certified songs ===
Title	Year	Certifications	Album
"Party in the U.S.A."	2010	US: Gold	Kidz Bop 17
"Call Me Maybe"	2012	US: Gold	Kidz Bop 22
"Best Day of My Life"	2014	US: Gold	Kidz Bop 26
"Shake It Off"	2014	US: Platinum	Kidz Bop 27
"Uptown Funk"	2015	US: Platinum	Kidz Bop 28
"Make Some Noise"	2015	US: Gold	Kidz Bop 30
"Havana"	2018	US: Gold	Kidz Bop 37
"Thunder"	2018	US: Gold	Kidz Bop 37
"Old Town Road"	2019	US: Platinum	Kidz Bop 40
"Dance Monkey"	2020	US: Platinum	Kidz Bop 41

== Concert film ==
Kidz Bop Live: The Concert Movie is an American concert film featuring the Kidz Bop Kids. Announced in November 2025, it documents a performance on the 2025 Kidz Bop Live Certified Bop Tour, filmed at the Honda Center in Anaheim, California. It features current group members Cliff Donadio, Shila Sable, Matty Googs, and Aleah Crew performing child-friendly versions of contemporary pop songs, including "APT" and "Pink Pony Club". The film ran a limited theatrical release in the United States from January 2 to 5, 2026, as part of Kidz Bop's 25th anniversary celebrations, in partnership with Fathom Entertainment, Concord Originals and Museum of Illusions.

== Related projects ==
=== Chuck E. Cheese music partnership ===
In August 2023, Chuck E. Cheese announced Kidz Bop as its official music partner, after using Kidz Bop music in its fun centers for several years.

=== Kidz Bop experience at Hard Rock Hotel & Casino Punta Cana ===
In 2018, Kidz Bop announced the fully branded "Kidz Bop Experience" at Hard Rock Hotel & Casino Punta Cana.

They opened a Kidz Bop experience at Hard Rock Riviera Maya in August 2019.

=== Legoland music partnership ===
In 2016, Legoland Florida appointed Kidz Bop as its official music partner, coinciding with the launch of Lego Ninjago World, on January 12, 2017. To celebrate the park's expansion, the Kidz Bop Kids recorded an original version of the park's (and the television series') theme song.

=== Crazy 8 fashion brand ===
Kidz Bop partnered with children's clothing brand, Crazy 8 to launch the Kidz Bop clothing line. The line was designed by Crazy 8. The collection is made for babies, children and early adolescents. The line was released on November 7, 2016, in Crazy 8 stores and online. The Kidz Bop performers wore the collection on stage during their 2016 Life Of The Party tour.

=== Kidz Star USA talent search ===
In 2010, Kidz Bop launched Kidz Star USA, a national talent search for children aged 15 and under.

In 2011, Kiana Brown from Phoenix, Arizona, became the second winner and received a recording contract from RCA Records. Season 8 winner of American Idol, Kris Allen, was a celebrity judge and mentor for the competition.

Dallas Wayde was the 2012 Winner with Gavin DeGraw as his celebrity mentor.

Isabel Lacatus won in 2013, with Jennette McCurdy as her celebrity mentor.

=== SiriusXM Radio ===
In January 2012, Kidz Bop launched its first radio show on SiriusXM Radio. Kidz Bop Block Party airs every Friday at 6:00 pm on Kids Place Live (Channel 69). In January 2014, Kidz Bop and SiriusXM Launched Kidz Bop Radio, a 24/7 channel dedicated to playing Kidz Bop music (Channel 135, formerly 79).

=== Video games ===
- Kidz Bop Dance Party: The Video Game – September 2010 (Nintendo Wii and Wii U)
