= Ola Melzig =

Swedish producer

Lars-Ola Melzig
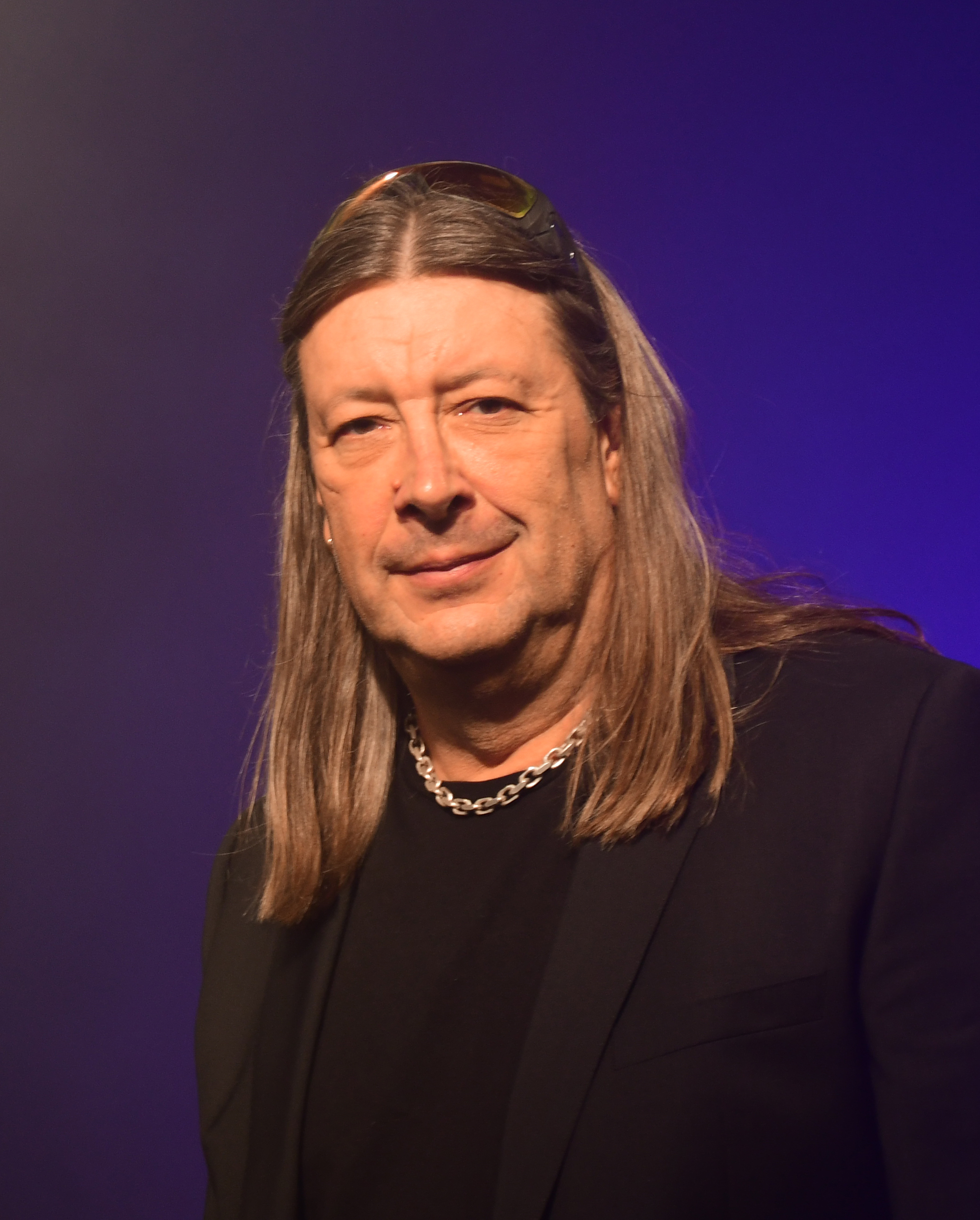
- Ola Melzig in 2022

Lars-Ola Melzig (born May 16, 1966) is a Swedish producer, most commonly associated with the Eurovision Song Contest (ESC). He first gained fame after 2000 as technical production manager for The Eurovision Song Contest, which was staged that year at Stockholm’s Globe Arena. Since 2000, Melzig has handled technical production for thirteen ESC finals and was seated as the Stage and Concert producer for two. Most recently, Melzig served as Head of Production for the Eurovision Song Contest 2019 in Tel Aviv, Israel.

== Early career ==
Melzig grew up in Malmö, Sweden. He left management at SAAB in the early 1990s for Stockholm, where he had a series of jobs at EMA Telstar (today Live Nation) and others. He did everything from running follow spots and driving forklifts, to production runner and assistant. As a lighting and backline tech, he toured extensively around Europe and the rest of the world. In 1994, Melzig started his own crewing company, M Concert Crew, which he ran for 3 years.

In 1997, Spectra Stage and Event Technologies AB invited him on board to build up an inhouse production department. Over the next nine years, he oversaw a wide assortment of TV, corporate events, exhibition stands and live shows of all sizes and styles. He left Spectra and went freelance with his own company, M & M Production Management AB in early 2007.

== The Eurovision Song Contest ==
Each year, the ESC production is held in the country of the previous year’s winner, and every year the entire production team is built from scratch. In 2000, Spectra was selected as technical supplier for the Eurovision Song Contest in Stockholm and Melzig was assigned Production Manager. This was the first time the show was produced in a concert format with a massive live audience and broadcast over the internet as opposed to the smaller studio audiences that had been used for the previous 44 years. This broadcast set a new bar of how to produce an ESC broadcast.

When Estonia won in 2001, Estonian Television (ETV) immediately called on Melzig to run their production. He was recruited for the following ESC productions in Latvia, Turkey, Ukraine (2003-2005), Finland (2007), Russia, Norway, Germany, Azerbaijan, Sweden (Malmö) (2009-2013), Sweden (Stockholm), Ukraine, Portugal (2016-2018), and Israel, respectively. He was consultant for ESC 2020 in The Netherlands but the event was cancelled due to COVID-19.

The Eurovision Song Contest 2024 will be held in Malmö, Sweden. It will be the second time for Ola Melzig working as technical director of Eurovision at Malmö arena.

In February 2017, he was awarded Production Manager of the Year at the annual TPI Awards in London for the 2016 ESC Stockholm show. In a production now being watched by over 200 million live viewers, Melzig was behind the wheel in 15 out of 20 since 2000 up to 2019. He has also been involved in the Junior Eurovision Song Contest five times.

== Sports ceremonies, Nobel Banquet and IIFA ==
Melzig has managed numerous high-profile televised productions including the Nobel Banquet, the opening and closing ceremonies for the 2010 Commonwealth Games in New Delhi, India, and the closing ceremony of the 2015 European Games in Baku, Azerbaijan. Other international productions include the 15th IIFA Awards, held for the first time on US soil in Tampa, FL and the 150-year anniversary of Cinco de Mayo, El Día de la Batalla de Puebla (Battle of Puebla) in Mexico.

== American Song Contest ==
In 2018, Melzig founded a new company together with Peter Settman, Christer Björkman and Anders Lenhoff They obtained a license from the European Broadcasting Union (EBU) that grants them the exclusive rights for the Eurovision format for The Americas. The concept is for the 50 states and 5 territories to compete for best original song. The contest ran for one season on NBC.

== Personal life and other ventures ==
Melzig is married to Joan Lyman Melzig and they split their time between Stockholm, Sweden and Austin, Texas. They have six grown children.

His work philosophy and sense of fun have always fueled the progression of his career. He was also early to adopt social media, starting the Eurovision Diary in 2002 – a daily look at the two-month technical buildup and rehearsals of the ESC. In it he admits, “I was blogging before blogging was a thing!”

Melzig is also the Founder and Co-owner of True Temperament Texas, a company that has the license for True Temperament fretting systems for The Americas.
